= Via San Gregorio Armeno =

Street in the historic centre of Naples, Italy

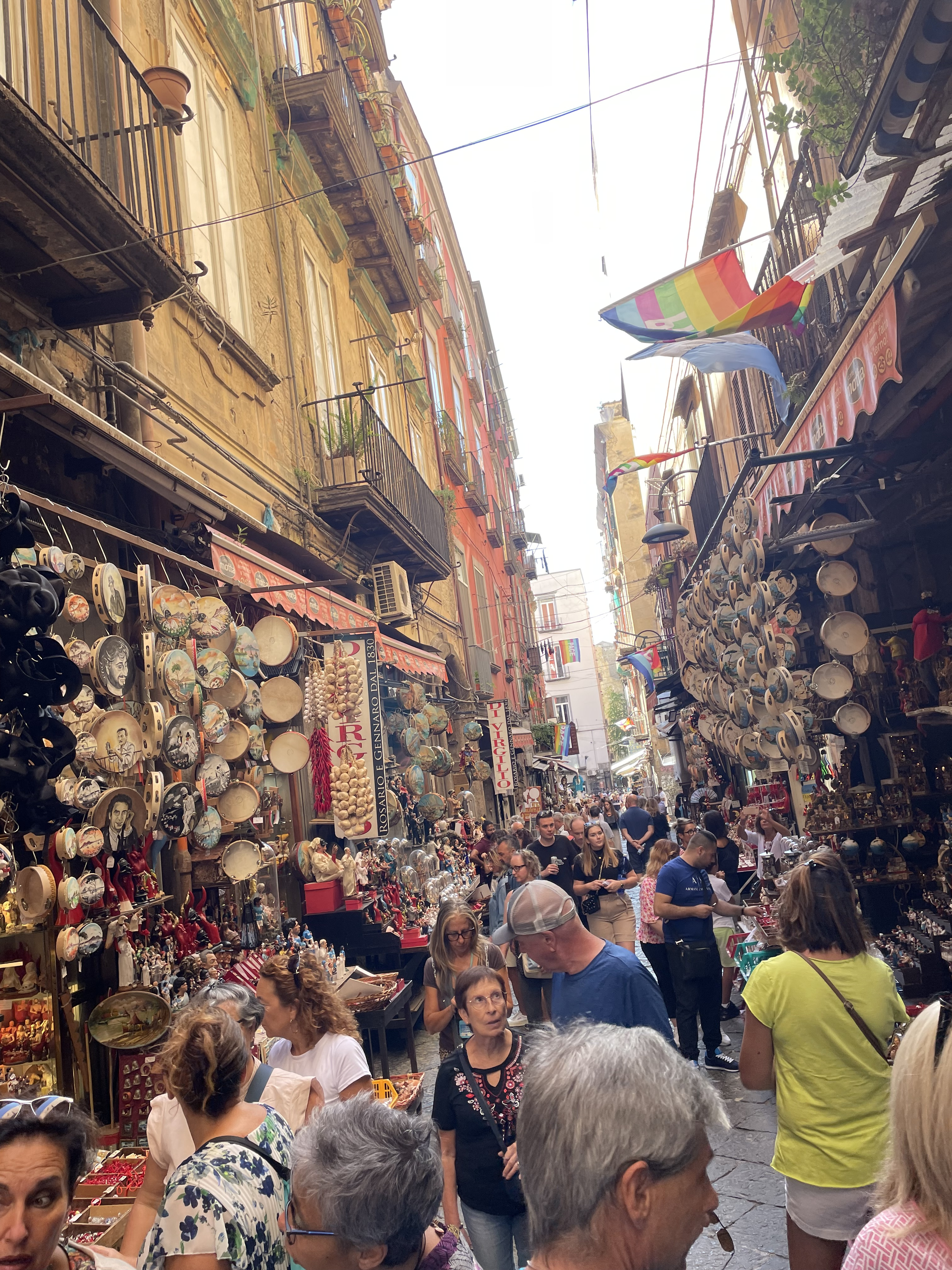
- View of Via San Gregorio Armeno
- Interactive map of Via San Gregorio Armeno
- Location: Naples, Italy
- Quarter: Historic Centre of Naples
- Postal code: 80138

Via San Gregorio Armeno is a street in the historic centre of Naples, well known to tourists for its craft workshops producing nativity figures.

== History and description ==
The street is one of the stenopoi (from the Greek stenosis, "narrowing", and poros, "passage") typical of the Greek urban layout that characterises the whole of the ancient centre of Naples. As a stenoporos (a cardo in Roman town planning), the street served as a link between the two plateiai (from the Greek plateia, literally "square" or "broad street"), the upper plateia (today's Via dei Tribunali) and the lower one (today's Spaccanapoli). The two main streets of ancient Neapolis (from the Greek for "New City"), today's Naples, were thus joined at right angles precisely by this street, at the point where the Basilica of San Paolo Maggiore now stands, the site of the ancient agora.

The street was later known as the plateia nostriana, after the 15th bishop of Naples, Saint Nostrianus, who had baths built there for the poor.

Starting from Piazza San Gaetano, on the right stands the dilapidated 18th-century building of the Banco del Popolo, once owned by the Casa degli Incurabili, which also owned an adjoining building a century older. Today, in a serious state of neglect, it is in need of major restoration work, having suffered various structural failures that led, in 2011, in addition to the existing reinforcement with Innocenti scaffolding poles, to the installation of temporary emergency protection for the many tourists visiting the area.

About halfway along the street stands the historic church of San Gregorio Armeno, founded around 930 on the foundations of the ancient temple of Ceres. It was only in 1205 that the church was dedicated to the saint of the same name.

At the far end of the street, near Via San Biagio, San Gennaro all'Olmo stands on the left, run by the Giambattista Vico foundation (it is no coincidence that the philosopher Giambattista Vico was baptised here). Opposite it stands the building traditionally identified as the domus Ianuaria, the house of San Gennaro. A plaque placed there in 1949 records the site as the saint's birthplace.

== The nativity-scene craft ==
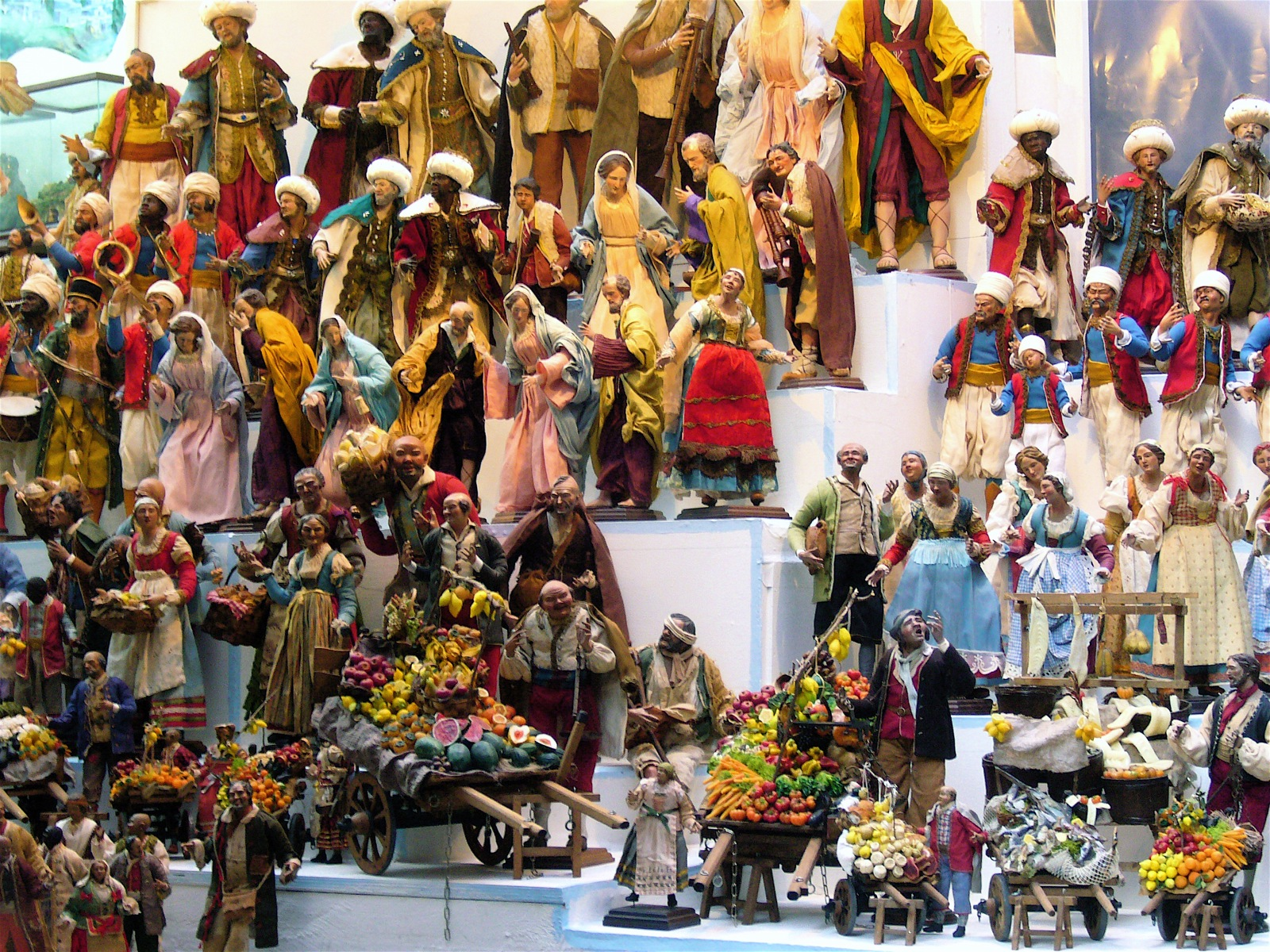
Some nativity figures along the street

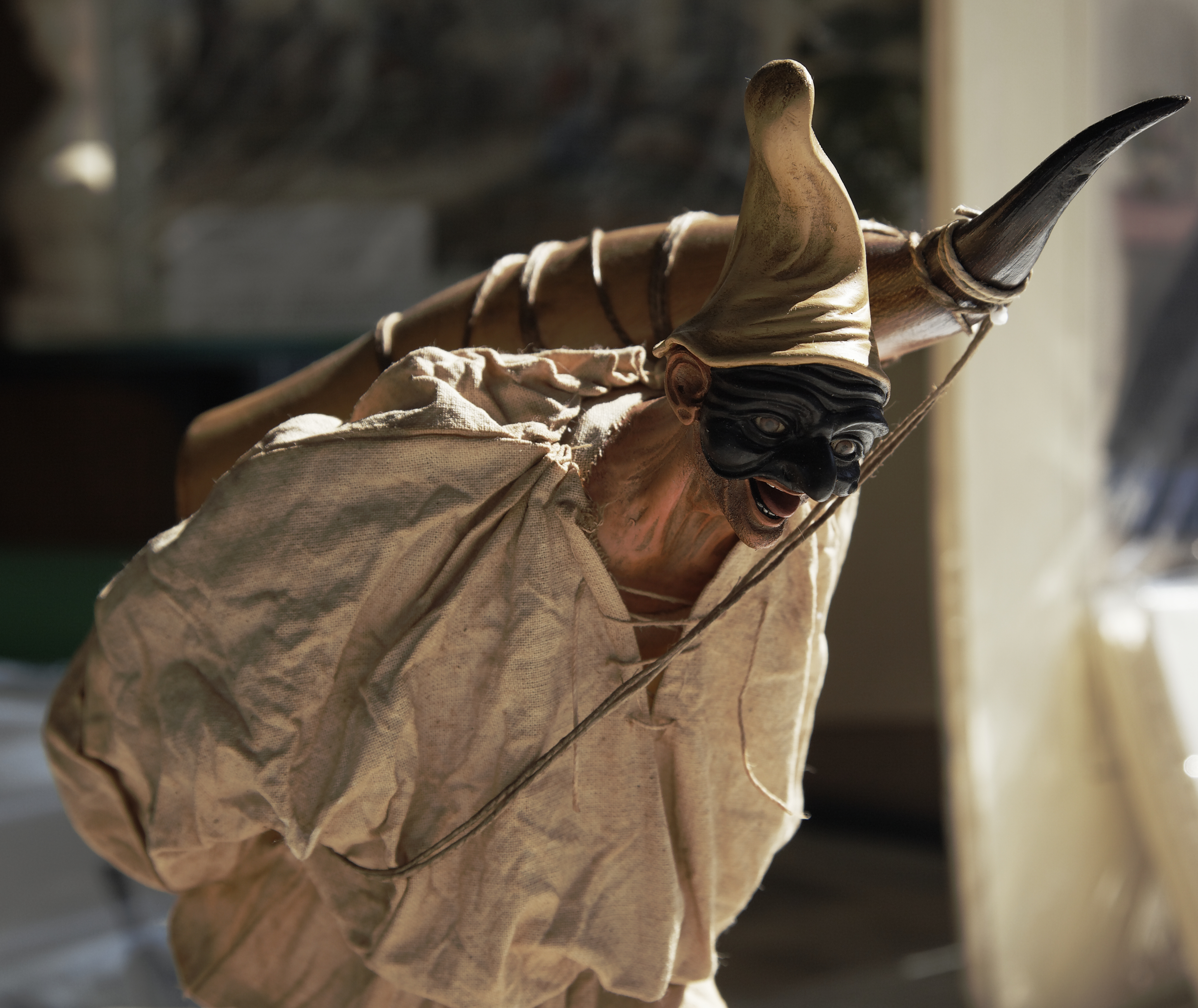
A nativity figurine of Pulcinella, the typical Neapolitan mask — cunning and insolent, wise and naive, servile and courteous, cowardly and shameless.

The nativity-scene tradition of San Gregorio Armeno has ancient roots: in classical times, a temple dedicated to Ceres stood on the street, to whom citizens offered small terracotta figurines as votive offerings, made in the nearby workshops. The birth of the Neapolitan nativity scene itself is naturally much later, dating back to the end of the 18th century.

Today, Via San Gregorio Armeno is known throughout the world as the centre of the craft workshops located there, which now produce nativity figurines all year round, both traditional and original ones (each year the more eccentric craftsmen typically produce figurines modelled on topical figures who have stood out, for better or worse, during the year).

The main displays begin around the Christmas period, usually from early November to 6 January.

== San Gregorio Armeno monastery ==
A distinctive feature of Via San Gregorio Armeno is the imposing bell tower of the homonymous church, which overlooks the street and rises above street level. The bell tower acts as a bridge connecting the two convents (church and monastery) dedicated to San Gregorio Armeno.

Finally, along the street (going up from the lower decumanus to the upper one), stand first the church of San Gregorio Armeno, built around the 10th century, and then, a little further up, with a separate entrance from the religious building itself, its cloister.

== See also ==
- Neapolitan nativity scene
- Historic Centre of Naples

== Bibliography ==
- Marrone, Romualdo (2004). Le strade di Napoli. Rome: Newton & Compton.
