= Ciro Punzo =

Italian painter (1850–1925)

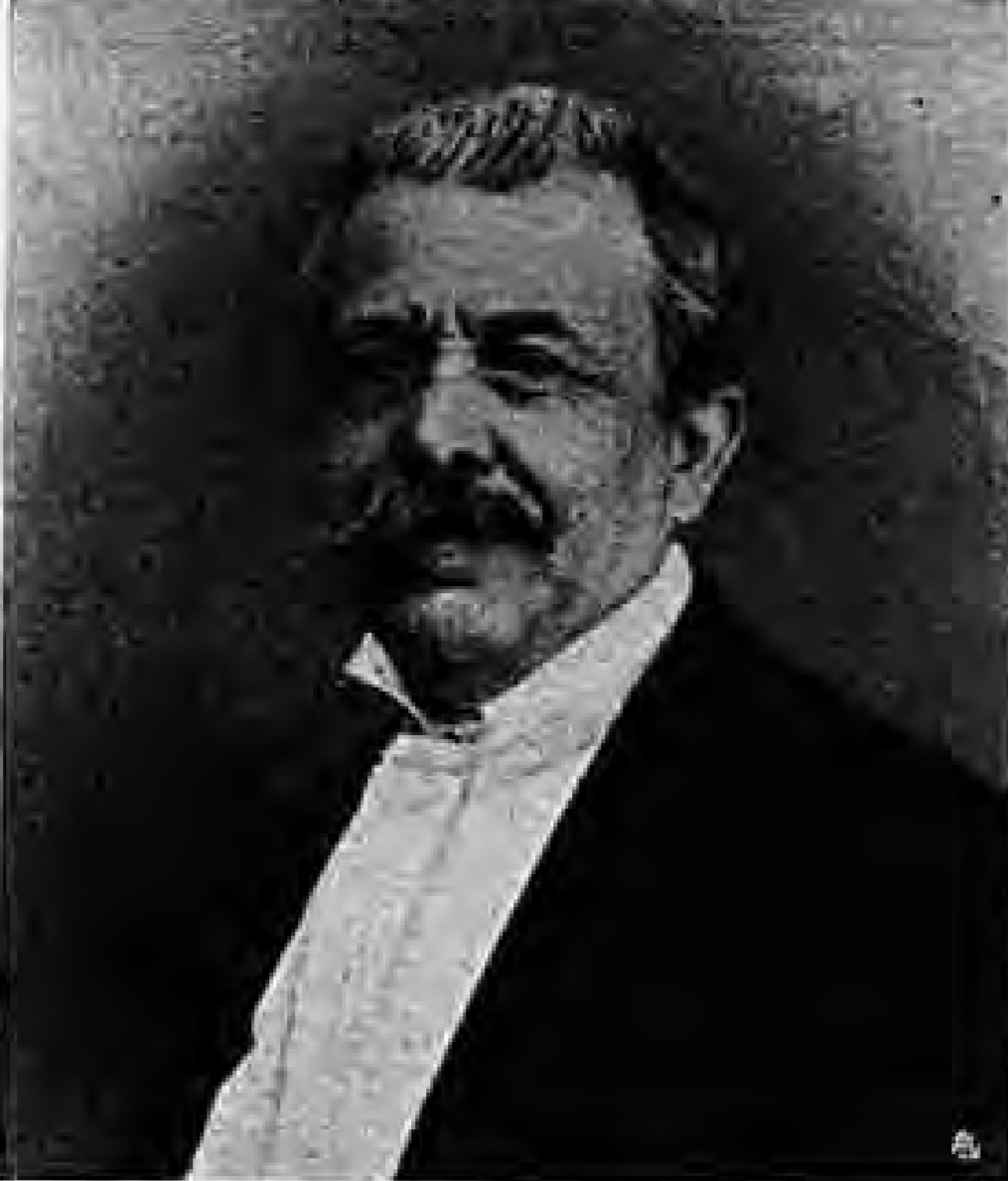
Ciro Punzo in 1916

Ciro Punzo (February 14, 1850 – 1925) was an Italian painter, mainly of interior scenes of daily life and vedute of churches.

== Biography ==
He was born in Naples. He studied at the Institute of Fine Arts under Giuseppe Mancinelli, and stayed a resident of Naples. At 16 years of age he exhibited a still-life of Fruit at the Mostra di Salvatore Rosa in Naples. He submitted to the 1872 Milan Exposition: La comunione; Church of San Liguori in Naples; and Sacristy of the church of Pietà in Naples. At the 1877 Exhibition of Naples, he sent: Marina di Torre del Greco and Church of San Gregorio Armeno. To Milan, in 1881, he sent: Sempre allegra (see below) and Lady with Teacup. While at the Promotrici of 1883 at Milan and Rome: Prega and La canzone dei nostri tempi. At the 1888 Exposition of Fine Arts of Bologna he exhibited Quiescat and the Church of the Gerolamini of Naples. In 1897 at Milan, he exhibited Inside the Church of San Severino. In 1898 in Turin, the Adoration of the Cross and in 1901 in Munich, Holy Friday. At about this period, Punzo painted Gregge al Pascolo and Pecore al Pascolo (see both below). He became honorary professor of the Institute of Arts in Naples.
