= Croce di Lucca, Naples =

Church of Croce di Lucca
- Chiesa di Croce di Lucca
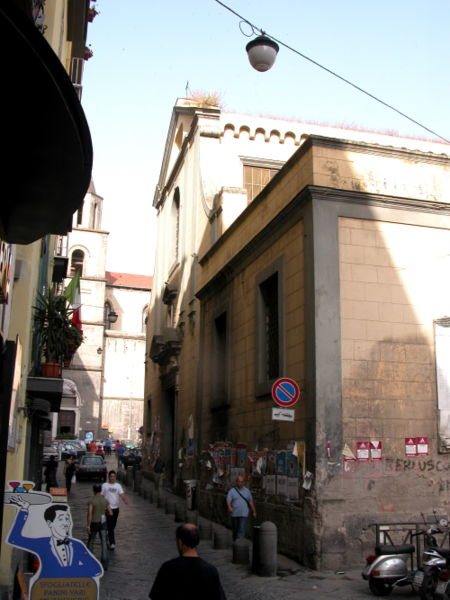
- The façade of Croce di Lucca.
- Church of Croce di Lucca
- 40.849912°N 14.253670°E
- Location: Via dei Tribunali; Naples; Province of Naples, Campania
- Country: Italy
- Denomination: Roman Catholic

Architecture
- Architectural type: Church
- Style: Baroque architecture
- Completed: 1694

Administration
- Diocese: Roman Catholic Archdiocese of Naples

The church of the Croce di Lucca is a religious edifice in central Naples, Italy, on the Via dei Tribunali.

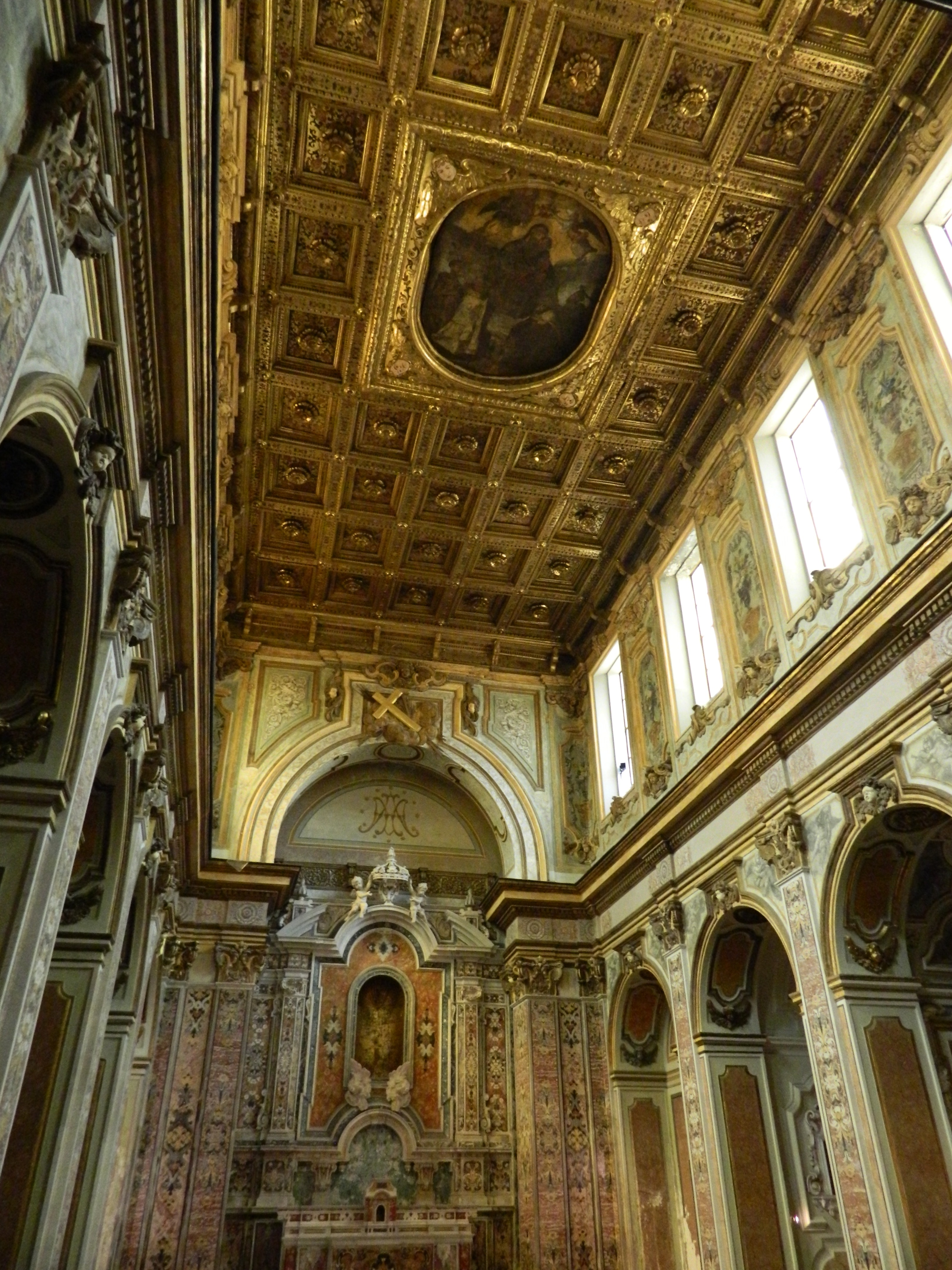
Interior.

In 1534, the husband and wife, Andrea Sbarra and Cremona Spinelli founded at this site a monastery of the Carmelites. It was devoted to the image of the crucifix, similar to one venerated in Lucca. Two years later, the widowed Spinelli became a nun. Later endowments came from the Prince of Altamura, who had five daughters join the order: Aurelia, Maria, Elena, Eleonora, and Elisabetta del Giudice. The church we see now was decorated in the 17th century, and remains despite the demolition of the once adjacent monastery.

The monastery is now replaced with medical clinics of the University of Naples. The interior was decorated on designs by Francesco Antonio Picchiatti. The nave ceiling has 16th century paintings depicting the Madonna del Carmine and Saints attributed to Giovanni Battista Caracciolo. Other works made for the church include puttini a chiaroscuro over the arches of the chapels by Giovanni Battista Rossi, pupil of Solimena. The first chapel on the left, has an Annunciation attributed to either Francesco Curia or Manchelli, a pupil of Marco da Siena. The second chapel has paintings of Saints Domenico & Monica by Nicola Malinconico. The third chapel has a Santa Maria Maddalena de’ Pazzi by the studio of Vaccaro. The altar and tabernacle are attributed to a Sanfelice in 1684. It has paintings by Giovanni Battista Rossi.

The first chapel on the left had a Virgin of the Rosary by Balducci. The second, a Santa Teresa by a follower of Vaccaro. The third chapel has paintings and frescoes by Nicola Malinconico. A wooden Virgin sculpture was attributed to Domenico di Nardo. The sacristy frescoes are attributed to Lionardo Olivieri, also a pupil of Solimena.
