= Giacomo Colombo =

Italian sculptor

- Born: 1663; Este, Padua, Italy
- Died: 1730 (aged 66–67); Naples, Italy
- Occupation: artist
- Movement: Arcadia, Rococo, Baroque

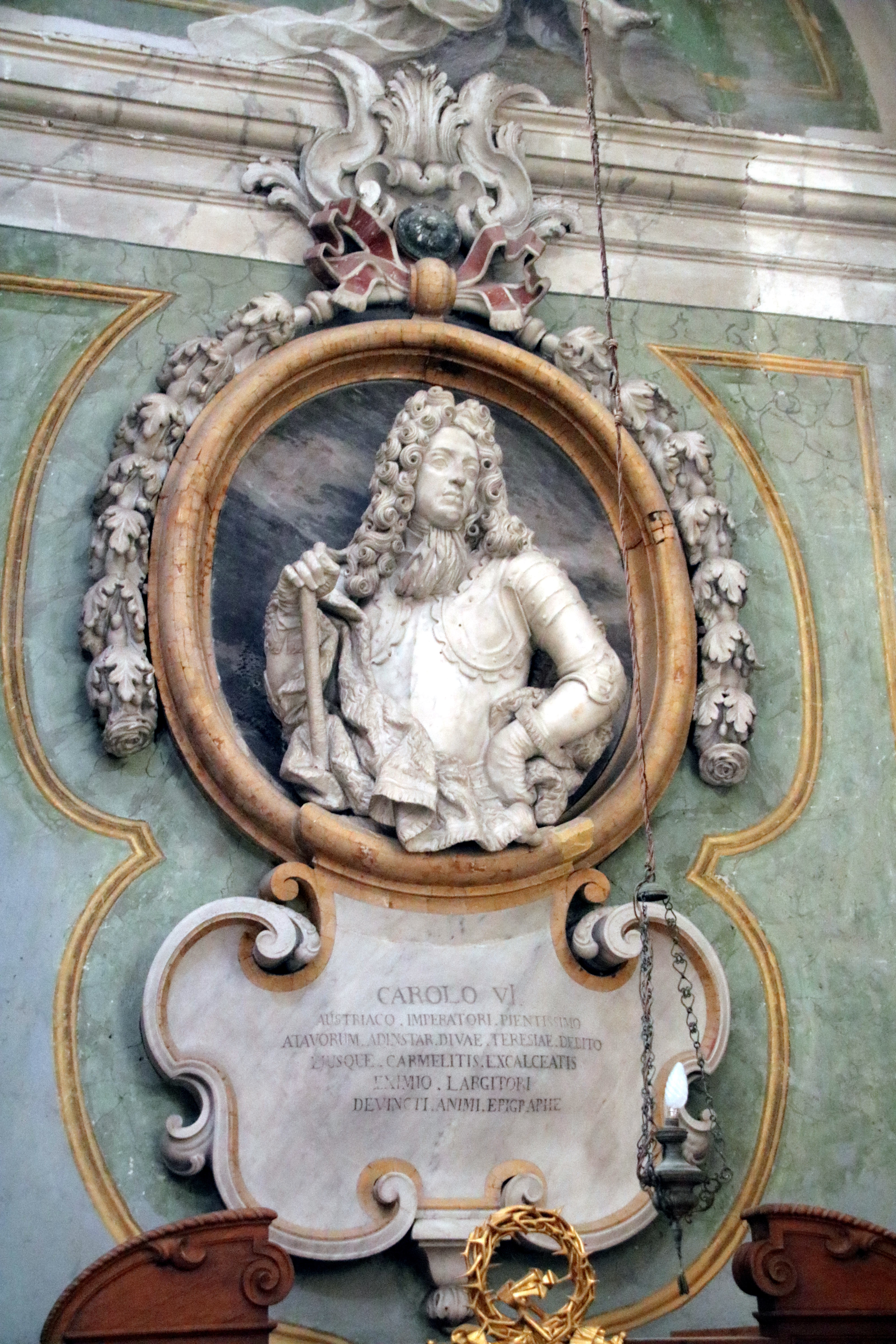
Giacomo Colombo, Bust of Emperor Charles VI, (1715), church of Santa Teresa degli Scalzi in Naples

Giacomo Colombo (1663–1730) was an Italian sculptor, painter and engraver. He worked in Naples, Italy in the late 17th and early 18th centuries.

== Biography ==
Colombo was born in 1663 in Este, Padua, Italy. He moved to Naples in 1678. Colombo was a student of sculptor, Domenico di Nardo. Colombo's sculptures were made primarily in marble, polychrome wood, and stucco. He also worked on engravings of his work. He worked in the Arcadian–Rococo style.

Colombo worked on Croce di Lucca, a church in Naples, and carved a large-scale organ, created decorative stucco arches, and worked on carving the marble stoups in 1688 working alongside sculptor Pietro de Barberis.

Between 1703 and 1704, Colombo was commissioned to create two marble bas-reliefs for the tombs of Anna Maria Arduino, Princess of Piombino from Messina, and her infant son Niccolò II Ludovisi at the church of San Diego all'Ospedaletto. Other works by Colombo are found at the chapel of San Vincenzo at Santa Caterina a Formiello (between 1724 and 1726, Naples), Santo Stefano, Capri (1691), San Ginés, Madrid (1698), amongst others.

He died in Naples on 1730.
