= Santa Teresa degli Scalzi =

Church of Santa Teresa degli Scalzi
- Chiesa di Santa Teresa degli Scalzi
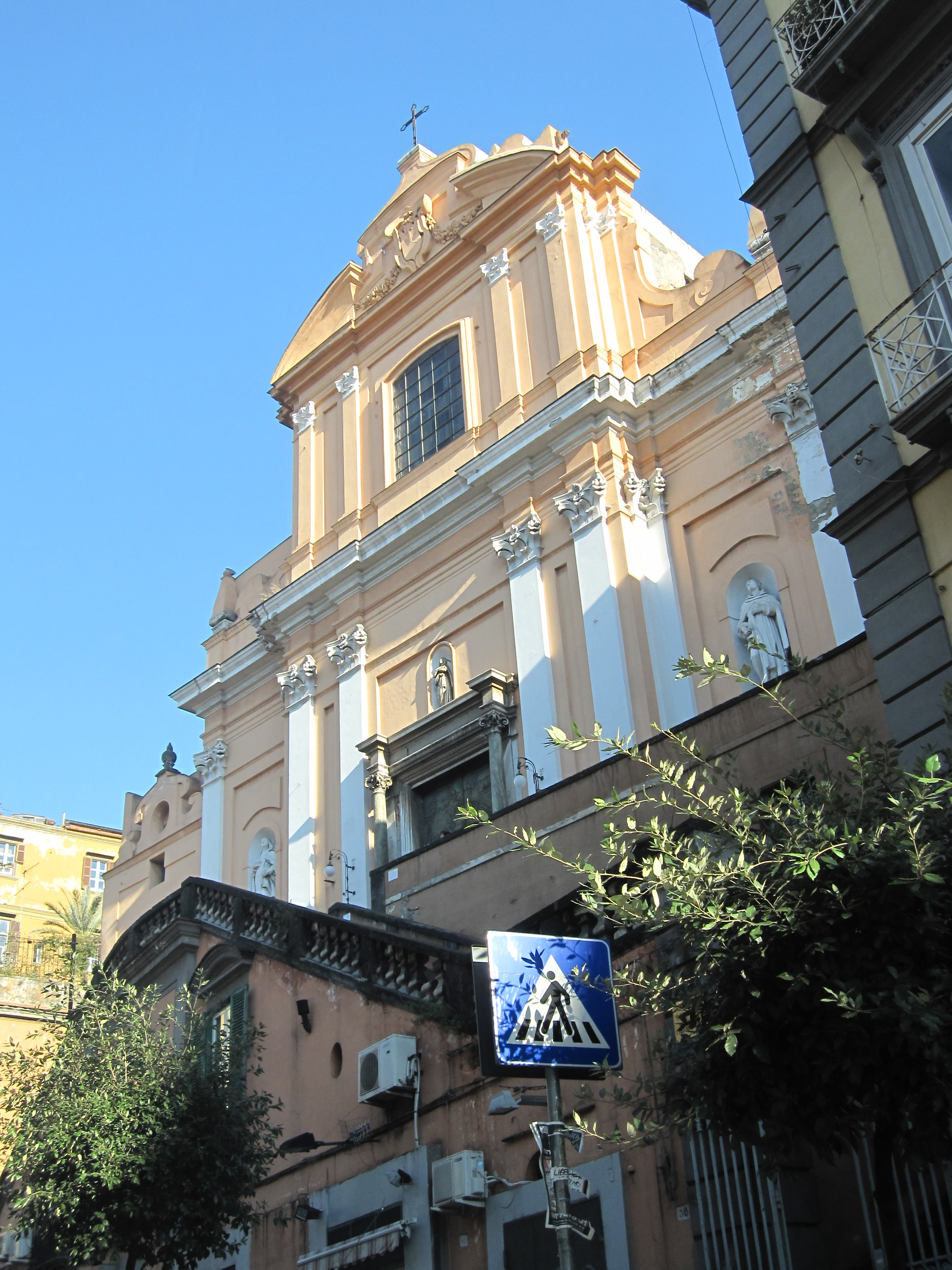
- The façade of church.
- Church of Santa Teresa degli Scalzi
- 40.854856°N 14.249135°E
- Location: Via Santa Teresa degli Scalzi; Naples; Province of Naples, Campania
- Country: Italy
- Denomination: Roman Catholic

History
- Status: Active

Architecture
- Groundbreaking: 1604

Administration
- Diocese: Roman Catholic Archdiocese of Naples

Santa Teresa degli Scalzi (previously known as the church of Santa Teresa al Museo, or of Santa Teresa agli studi or della Madre di Dio) is a church in Naples, Italy, located in via Santa Teresa degli Scalzi, a wide street opened during 1806–1810, to connect the historic center of Naples to the zone of Capodimonte. The church is generally closed to the public.

Church construction began in 1604 and the church was consecrated in 1612 under the Order of Discalced Carmelites thanks to the donations obtained by the Spanish Carmelite follower of St Teresa of Avila, the preacher Pietro della Madre di Dio.

== Exterior ==
Construction of the church and convent were directed by Giovan Giacomo di Conforto, while Cosimo Fanzago in 1652 designed the facade with its two stucco statues of Saint Teresa d'Avila and St John of the Cross. In 1835, a ramp needed to be built when the street level was lowered.

The interior is a Latin cross plan with a single nave; in the chapel are conserved works by Baroque artists including Paolo De Matteis and the Flemish painter Niccolò De Simone. There is also a tomb sculpted by Tito Angelini, statues by Domenico Antonio Vaccaro, busts by Matteo Bottigliero and Angelo Viva and some decorations by Costantino Marassi.

The second chapel on left has painting depicting the History of the Carmelite Order (1616–1620) by Battistello Caracciolo, and the fourth chapel on the right has an Assumption of the Virgin with a choir of Angels (1613) by Belisario Corenzio. Giacomo del Po painted the large canvases at the sides of the transept crossing; they depict the Battle of Prague and the Flight to Egypt and the cornices have figures depicting virtue and angels.

The cupola, designed by Di Conforto, collapsed in 1835 likely due to faulty construction; the replacement has little artistic merit. This church has the only sculptural image of a member of the House of Habsburg in Naples in the form of an image of the Emperor Charles VII sculpted by Giacomo Colombo in 1715.

=== Former main altar ===
After the suppression of the religious orders in 1808, the ornate main altar completed by Dionisio Lazzari was transported to the Capella Reale of the Royal Palace of Naples, where it still can be found. The altar started in 1672, has two carved lateral doors (1691), a ciborium (1772), all in polychrome pietre dure and lapis lazuli and framed in gilded bronze. In this church, the replacement altar (1772–1773) derives from the church of Divino Amore.

=== The chapel of St Teresa of Ávila ===
The chapel of Saint Teresa of Ávila was designed in 1640 by Cosimo Fanzago; it has polychrome marble and decorative stucco. There are two paintings by Ippolito Borghese and it contains an incongruous modern statue of the saint.

== The convent ==
Originally the palace of the Duke of Nocera, the convent now houses various associations and institutes.

== Bibliography ==
- Vincenzo Regina, Le chiese di Napoli. Viaggio indimenticabile attraverso la storia artistica, architettonica, letteraria, civile e spirituale della Napoli sacra, Newton and Compton Editor, Naples 2004.
