= Via dei Tribunali, Naples =

Street in the old historic center of Naples, Italy

Coordinates: 40°50′N 14°15′E

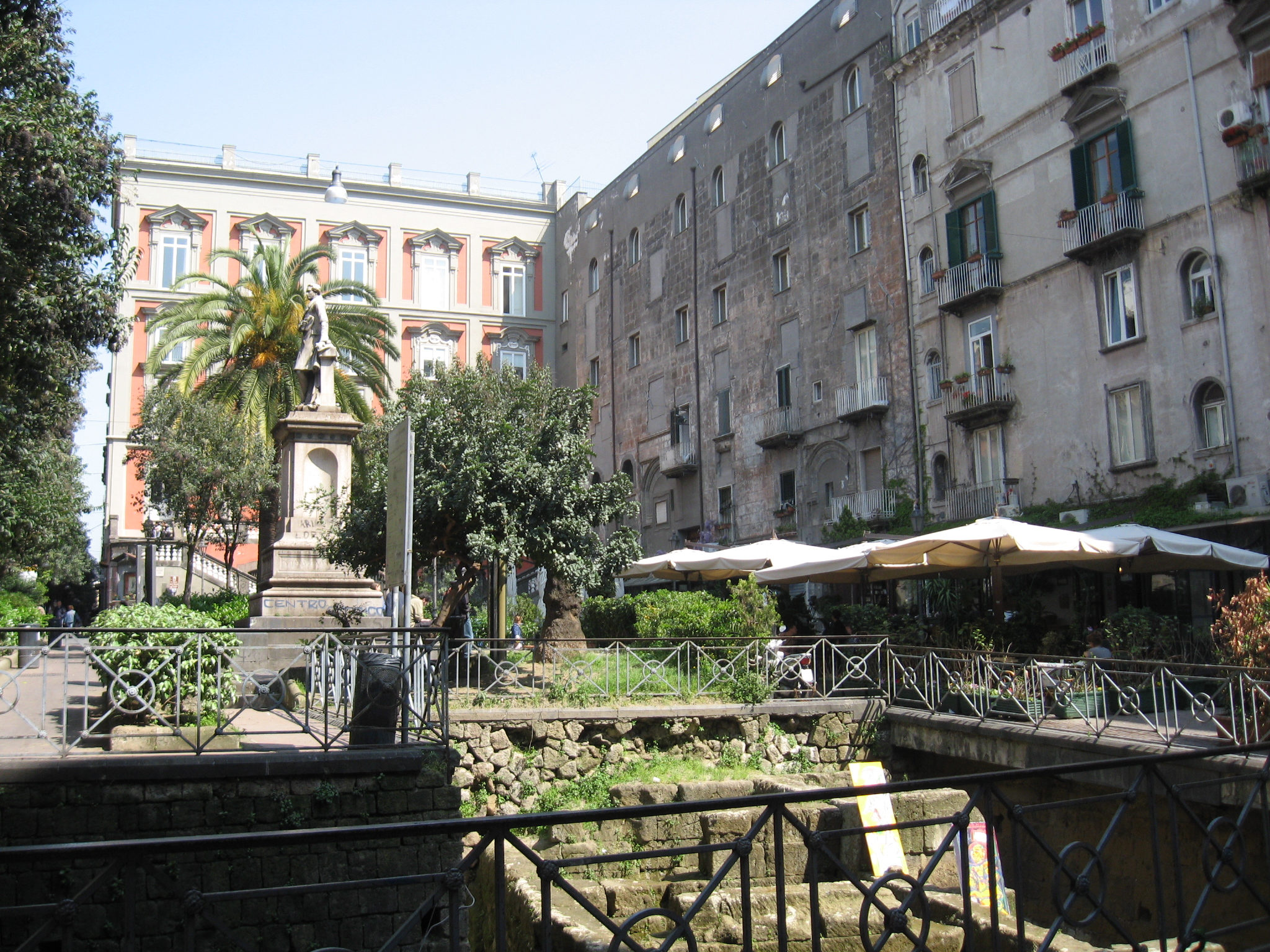
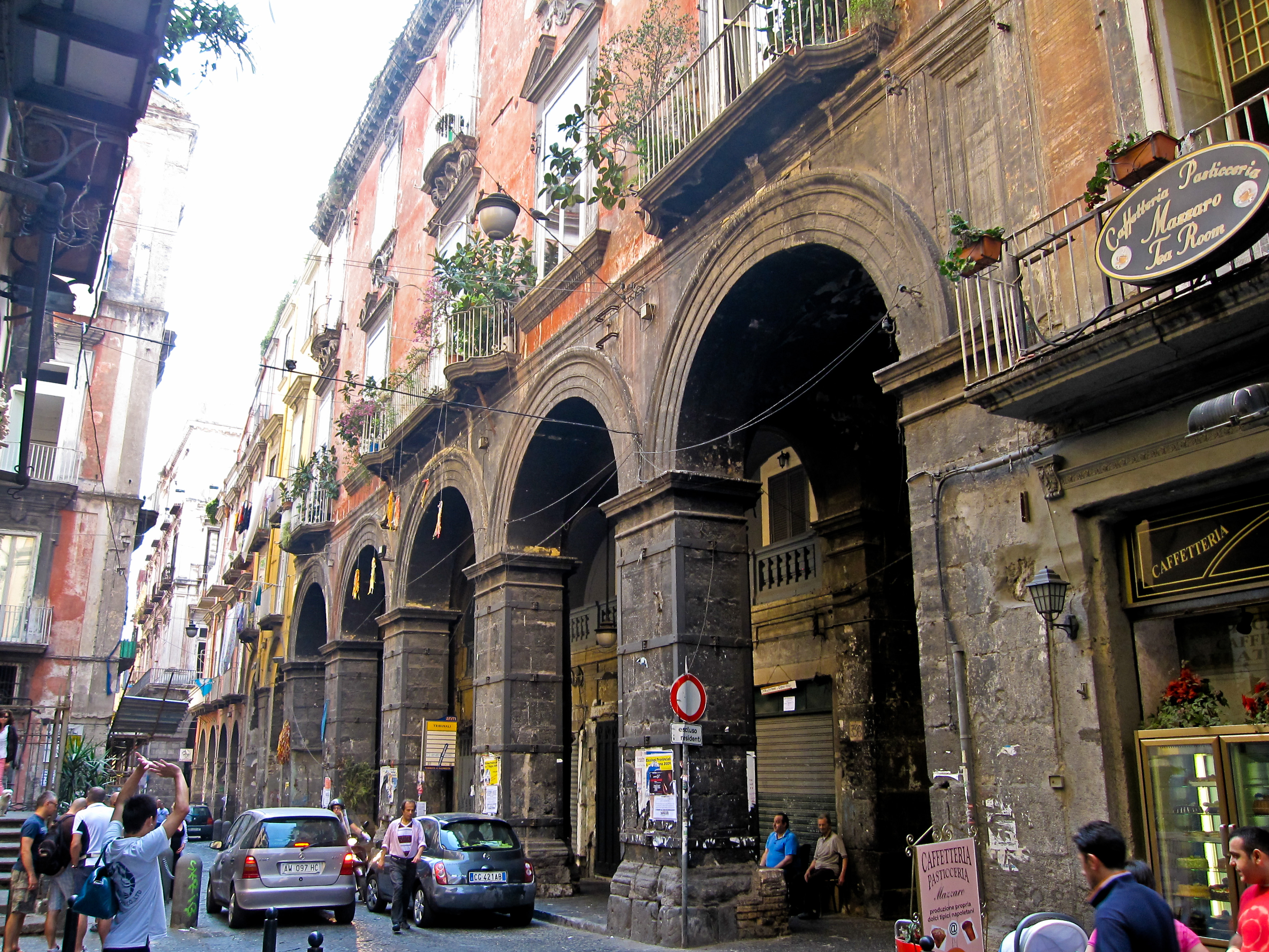
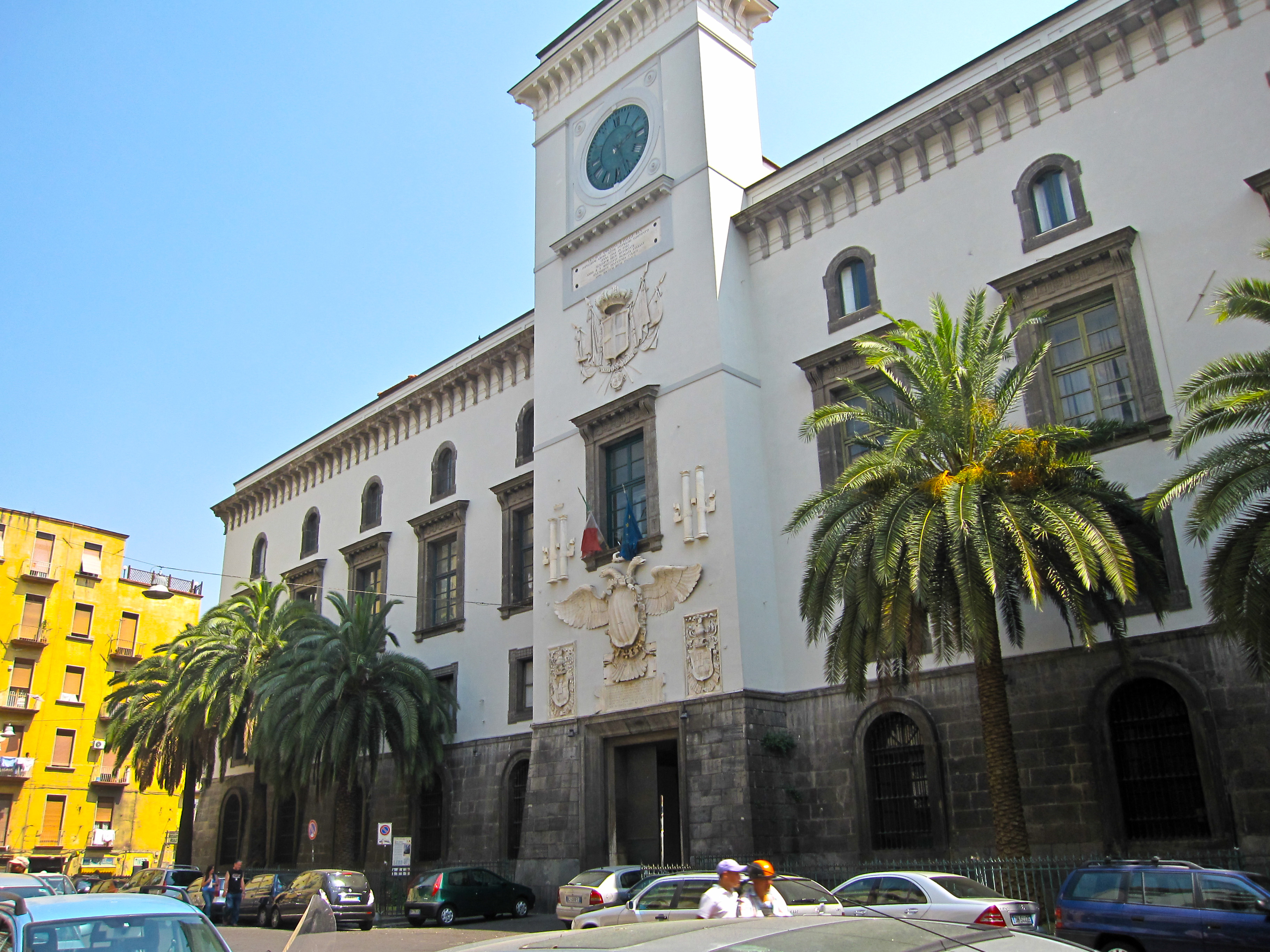
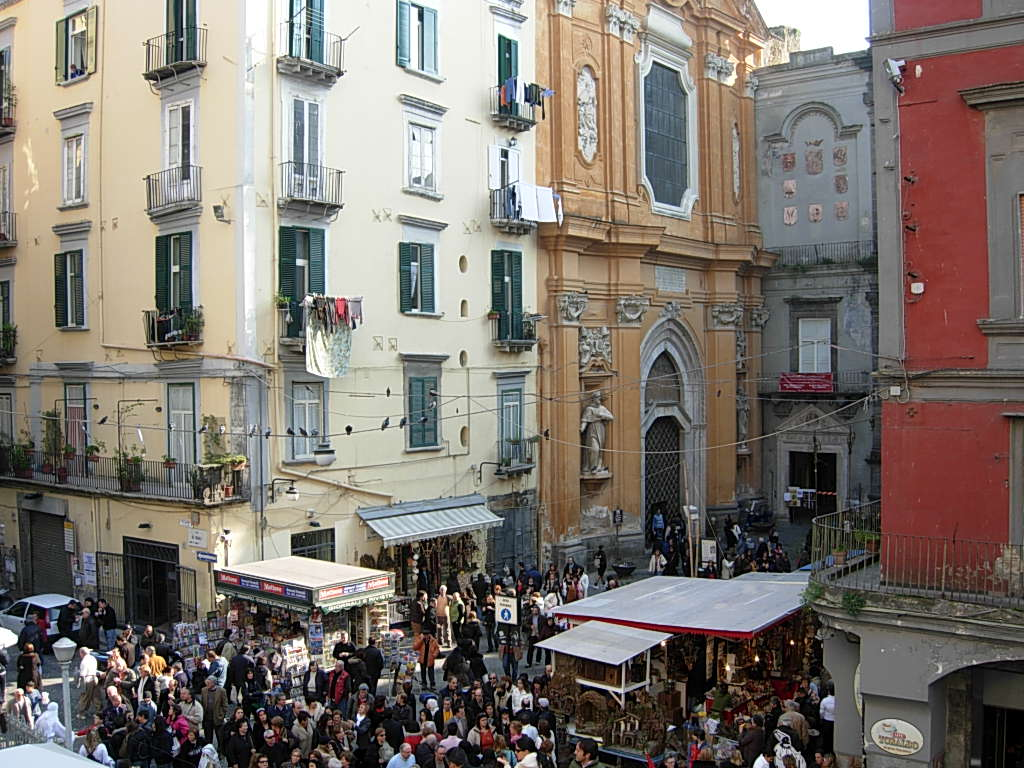
Clockwise from upper left:
- The archaeological excavations of Piazza Bellini, the cultural lounge of the historic center located at the beginning of the decumanus;
- The portico of Palazzo Filippo d'Angiò along Via dei Tribunali;
- Piazza San Gaetano, where the ancient agora stood in the Greek era, at the end of Via San Gregorio Armeno;
- Castel Capuano, which stands at the end of the street.

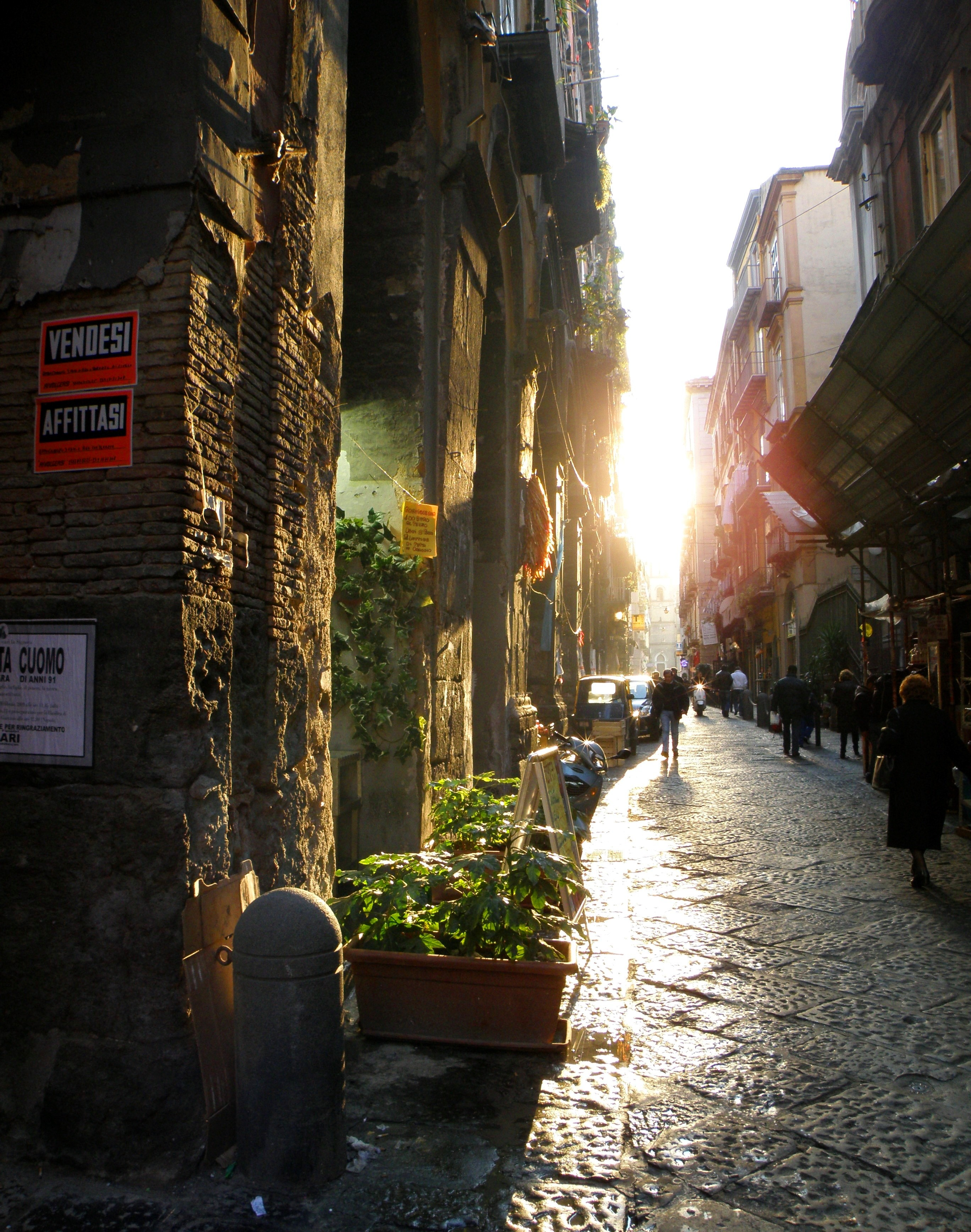
Via dei Tribunali, also called Decumanus Maximus

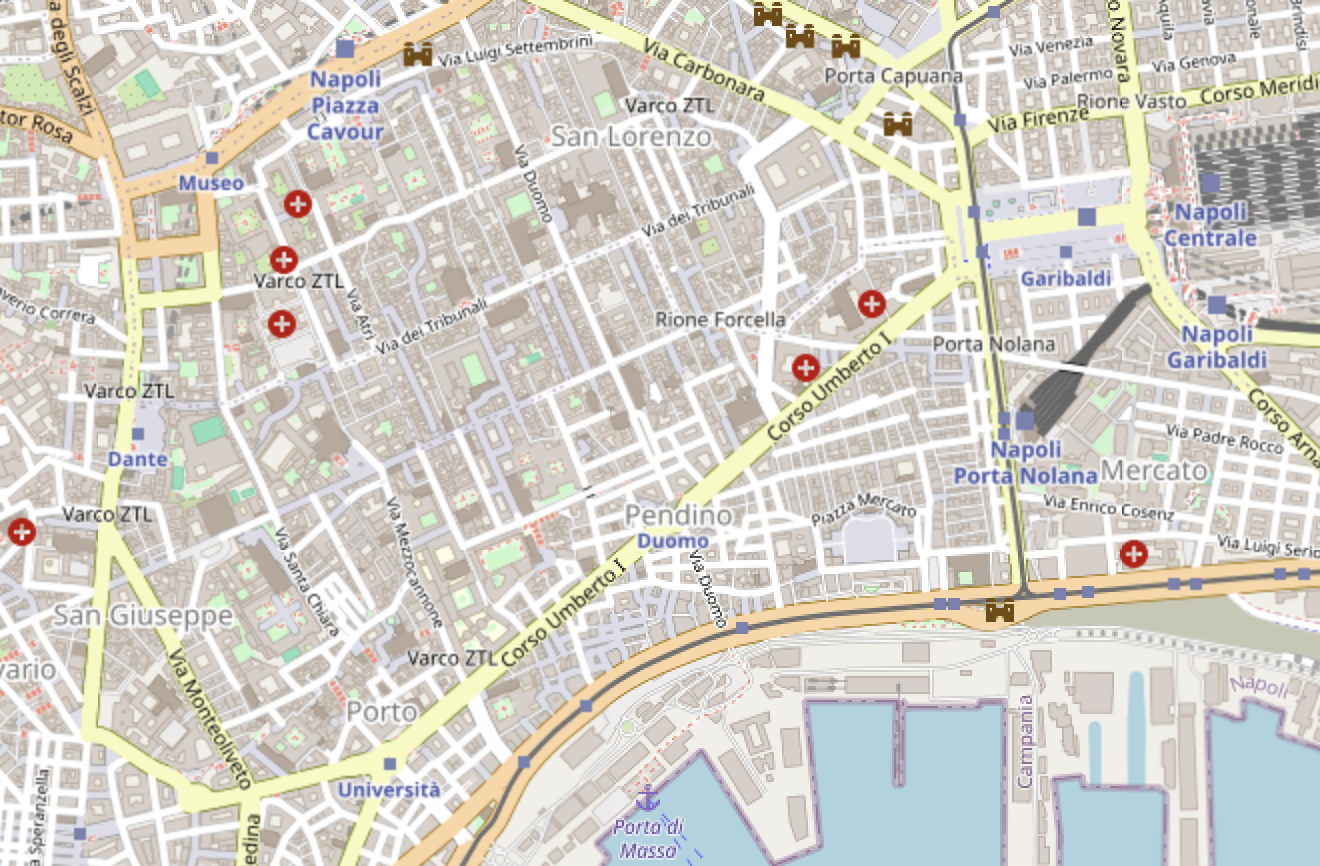
OpenStreetMap snippet with Via dei Tribunali roughly in the centre

Via dei Tribunali is a street in the old historic center of Naples, Italy.

It was the main decumanus or Decumano Maggiore — that is, the main east-west street — of the ancient Greek and then Roman city of Neapolis, paralleled to the south by the lower decumanus (Decumano Inferiore, now called Spaccanapoli) and to the north by the upper decumanus (Decumano Superiore) (now via Anticaglia and Via della Sapienza). The three decumani were (and still are) intersected by numerous north-south cross-streets called cardini, together forming the grid of the ancient city. The modern streets/alleys overlie and follow the ancient grid of these ancient streets.

The length of the modern Via dei Tribunali was determined by the urban expansion requirements of the Spanish starting in the early 16th century. The street runs from the church of San Pietro a Maiella and adjacent Naples Music Conservatory at the west end of the old city for about three-quarters of a mile, passing the central cross-road at via San Gregorio Armeno, then crossing via Duomo near the Cathedral of Naples and ending at Castel Capuano, the former Naples courthouse (Italian: Tribunale), from which the street draws its name.

== Buildings and Structures ==
The following are important or ancient buildings along the Street from East to West:

- Church of Santa Maria della Mercede e Sant'Alfonso Maria de' Liguori
- Sant'Antonio delle Monache a Port'Alba
- Conservatory of San Pietro a Majella
- Church of San Pietro a Majella
- Church of Croce di Lucca
- Pontano Chapel
- Church of Santa Maria Maggiore alla Pietrasanta
- Palazzo Spinelli di Laurino
- Palazzo Filippo d'Angiò
- Basilica Church of San Paolo Maggiore
- Basilica Church of San Lorenzo Maggiore
- Church of Santa Maria delle Anime del Purgatorio ad Arco
- Church of Girolamini
- Church of Santa Maria della Colonna
- Duomo di Napoli (at corner of via Duomo)
- Guglia di San Gennaro
- Palazzo Caracciolo di Gioiosa
- Pio Monte della Misericordia
- Church of Santa Maria della Pace
- Church of Santa Maria del Rifugio
- Church of San Tommaso a Capuana
- Chapel of the Monte dei Poveri
- Castel Capuano
- Guglia di San Gaetano
- Vico and Vicoletto of Zuroli
