= Santa Maria della Mercede e Sant'Alfonso Maria de' Liguori =

Church building in Naples, Italy

Chiesa di Santa Maria della Mercede e Sant'Alfonso Maria de' Liguori
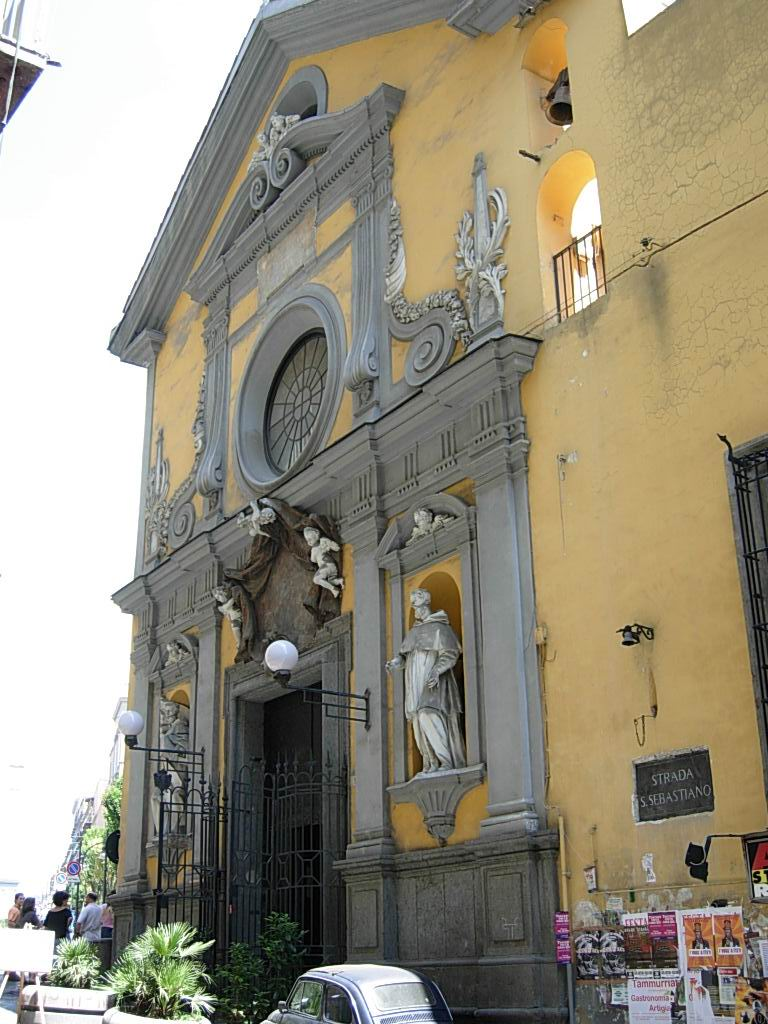
- Façade by Ferdinando Sanfelice.
- Chiesa di Santa Maria della Mercede e Sant'Alfonso Maria de' Liguori
- 40.849340°N 14.252140°E
- Location: Naples; Province of Naples, Campania
- Country: Italy
- Denomination: Roman Catholic

History
- Status: Active

Architecture
- Architectural type: Church
- Style: Baroque architecture

Administration
- Diocese: Roman Catholic Archdiocese of Naples

Santa Maria della Mercede e Sant'Alfonso Maria de' Liguori (formerly church of Santa Maria della Redenzione dei Captivi) is a Roman Catholic church located in via San Sebastiano #1 in the historic center of Naples, Italy. It was set up to host a charity that ransomed Christian enslaved and captive people from Muslims.

It rises on the South-Eastern corner of the intersection of Via San Sebastiano - Via Santa Maria di Constantinopoli, and the Vico San Pietro da Maiella and the outlet of the Via Port'Alba, a narrow alley starting at the medieval gate of Port'Alba. The Vico San Pietro da Maiella feeds into the southernmost end of Via dei Tribunali (the Decumanus Maximus of the ancient city), corner with via San Sebastiano, and on the Vico, neighboring to the east and behind the church, stands the Conservatory of San Pietro a Majella.

== History ==
The church was founded in the second half of the 16th century by a charitable organization that arose in 1548, almost certainly affiliated if not the same as the Order of the Blessed Virgin Mary of Mercy, with the aim of freeing captive Christians who had been captured by Muslim navies and brigands. Sometime they arranged exchanges of similarly enslaved Muslims for their Christian counterparts.

Once the association had operated with the church of San Domenico Maggiore, Naples, but began construction of this new church on land ceded to them by the Celestines from the nearby church of San Pietro a Majella, Naples.

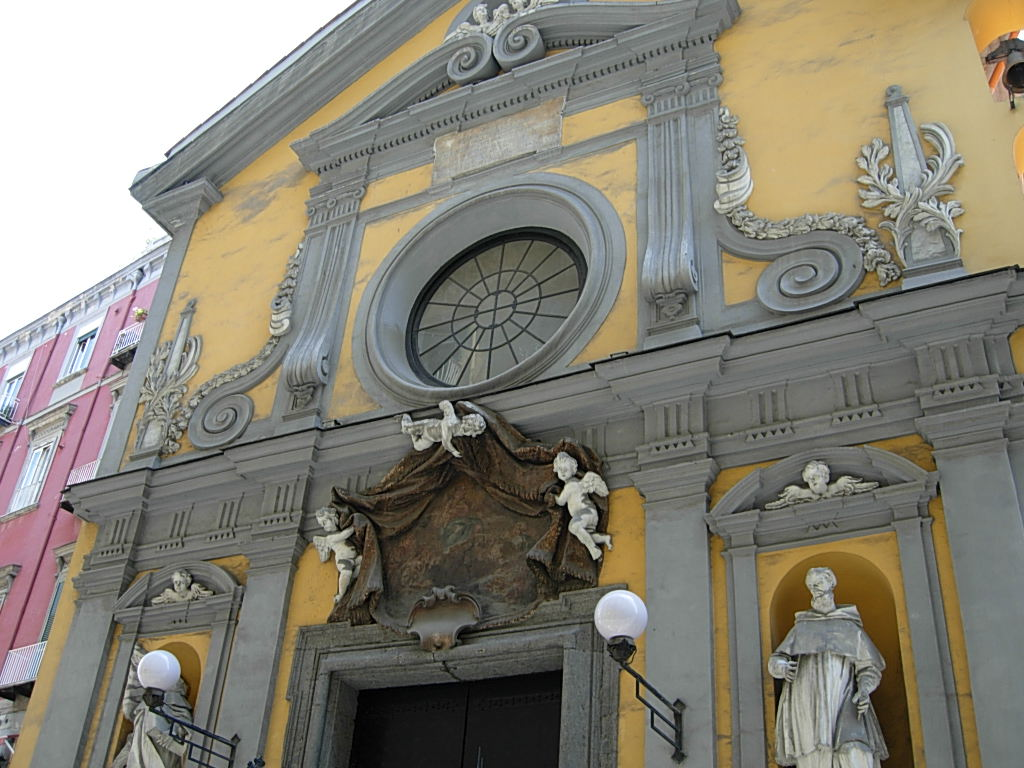
Façade detail

In 1706, the church, including the facade with its volutes and obelisk decoration, was rebuilt by Ferdinando Sanfelice. Further reconstructions were performed in 1715 and 1836.

This church houses the relics of St Alphonsus Maria de' Liguori, who gave up his status as a nobleman to follow his vocation to become a priest. He is depicted at the feet of the Virgin, to whom he was devoted, laying down his sword, and vowing to dedicate to the priesthood.

== The interior ==
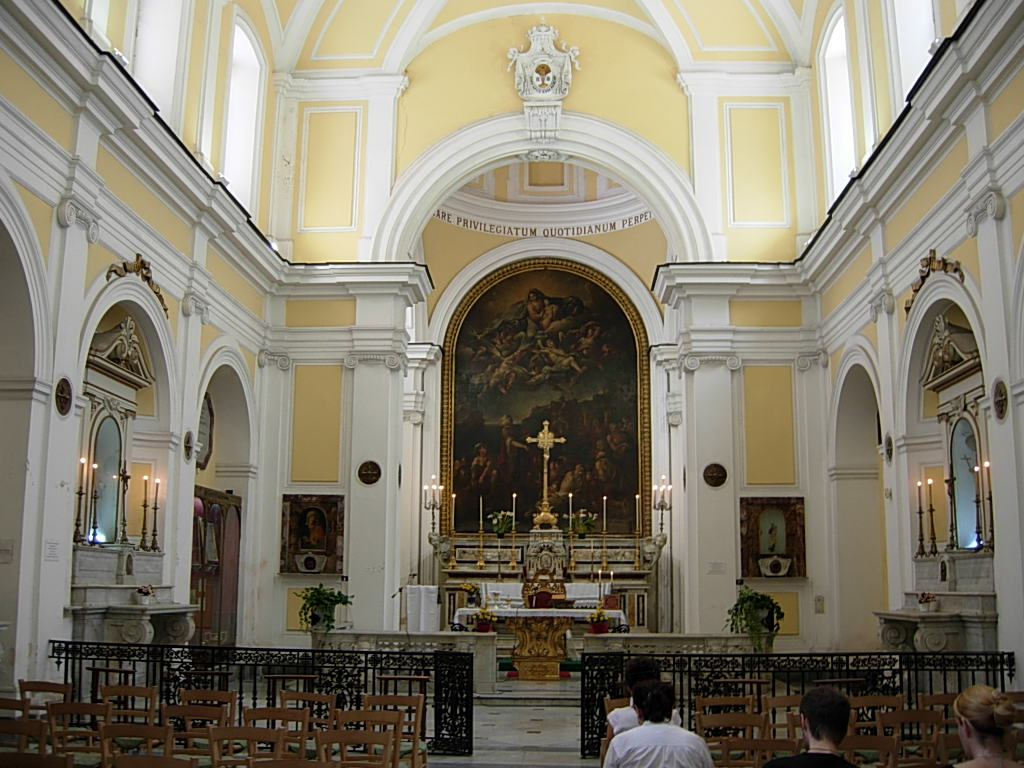
Interior

The nave has an extensive stucco decoration. The counterfacade was painted (1571-1618) by Teodoro d'Errico (the Italian name for Flemish painter Dirck Hendricksz): it contains a painting of the Angel of Annunciation, on right and a Madonna of the Annunciation, on the left.

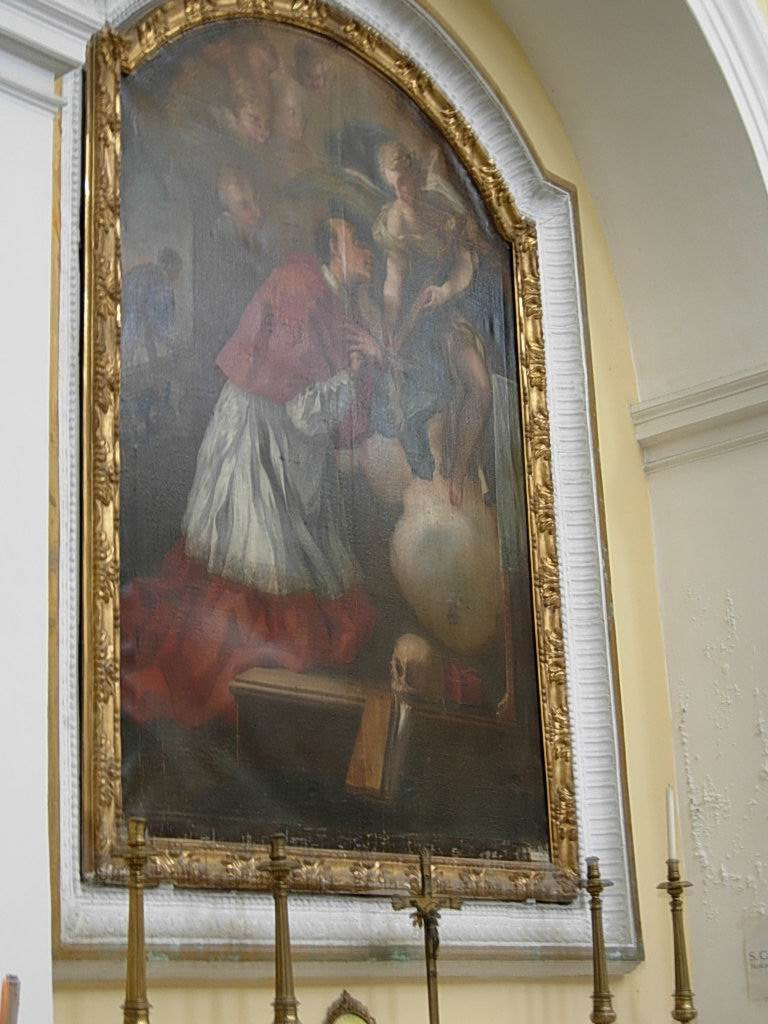
San Carlo Borromeo, by Nicola Malinconico

The paintings of the side altars are:

- St Anne, first altar on right, by Giuseppe Simonelli
- St Francis of Assisi, second altar on right by Nicola Malinconico
- St Nicola di Bari, third altar on right, Malinconico
- St Carlo Borromeo, first altar on left, Malinconico
- St Francesco di Paola, second altar on left, Malinconico
- St Celestine V and Anthony of Padua, third altar on left by Giuseppe Simonelli

Both Simonelli and Malinconico were students of Luca Giordano. The main altarpiece is a canvas depicting the Ransom of Slaves (1672), by Giacomo Farelli, which depicts the Virgin with the child between whose arms above a group of slaves awaits redemption by the arrival of a boat. The main altar was restored by Sanfelice and Lorenzo Fontana. The putti there were sculpted by Domenico Antonio Vaccaro.

== Bibliography ==
- Vincenzo Regina, Le chiese di Napoli. Viaggio indimenticabile attraverso la storia artistica, architettonica, letteraria, civile e spirituale della Napoli sacra, Newton and Compton Editor, Naples 2004.
