= Purgatorio ad Arco =

Church in Naples, Italy

Church of Purgatorio ad Arco
- Chiesa di Santa Maria delle Anime del Purgatorio ad Arco
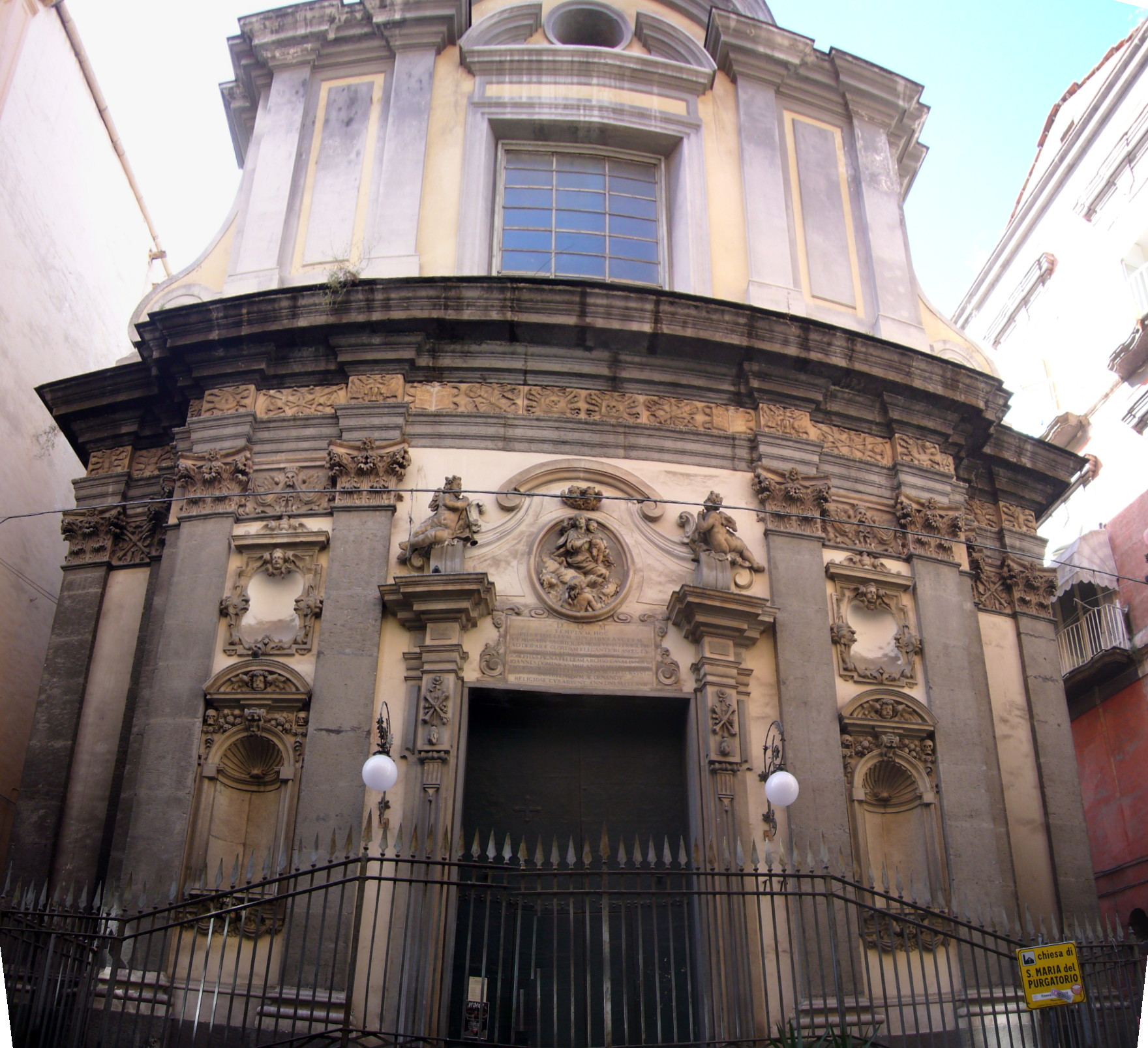
- Facade of church.
- Church of Purgatorio ad Arco
- 40.850571°N 14.255700°E
- Location: Via dei Tribunali; Naples; Province of Naples, Campania
- Country: Italy
- Denomination: Roman Catholic

History
- Status: Active

Architecture
- Architectural type: Church
- Style: Baroque architecture
- Completed: 1616

Administration
- Diocese: Roman Catholic Archdiocese of Naples

The church of the Purgatorio ad Arco, or Santa Maria delle Anime del Purgatorio ad Arco is a religious edifice in central Naples, Italy, located on Via dei Tribunali. The church is two blocks west of the church of Santa Maria Maggiore della Pietrasanta on Via dei Tribunali.

== History ==
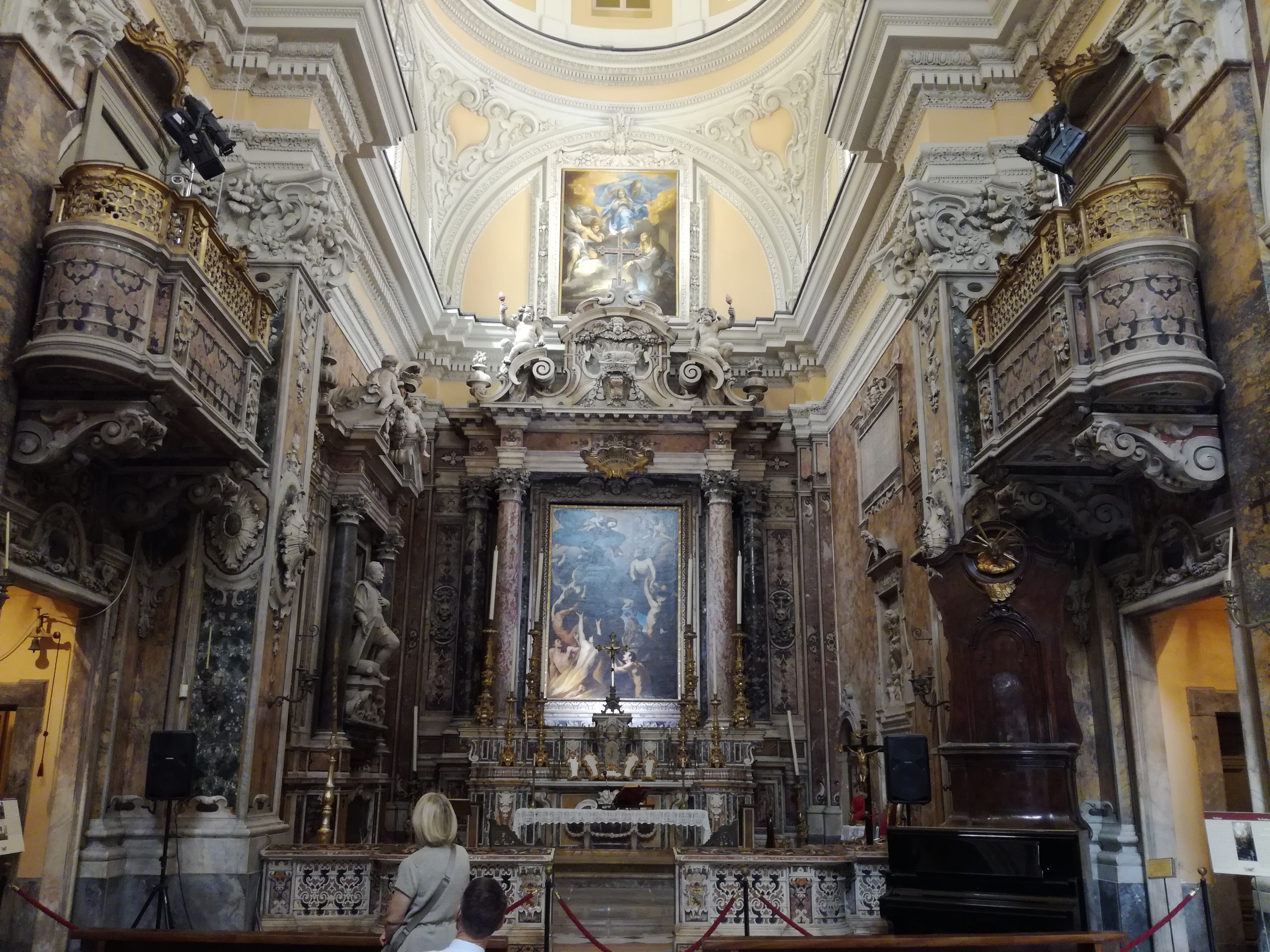
Main altar.

It was attached to the Congregation of the same name, established to pray for the souls in purgatory. The church was designed by Giovan Cola Di Franco, and consecrated in 1638. The apse is richly decorated with polychrome marble and stucco, and has a peculiar detail of winged skulls, by Dionisio Lazzari, on the pilasters lateral to the main altarpiece. The church has altarpiece by Massimo Stanzione (Virgin helps souls in Purgatory, 1638, main altarpiece), Andrea Vaccaro (Transit of St Joseph, 1650–51, third chapel on right), and Luca Giordano (Death and Ecstasy of St. Alessio, 1661, third chapel on left).

To the left of the altar is the funeral monument of Giulio Mastrillo, by Andrea Vaccaro. Above the main altarpiece in the cupola is a canvas by Giacomo Farelli: St Anne offers the child Virgin Sant’Anna to God the father (1670) as well as a Victory of St Michael (165) by Girolamo De Magistro.
