= Leonardo Antonio Olivieri =

Italian painter

Leonardo Antonio Olivieri or Oliviero (23 February 1689 – 7 June 1752) was an Italian painter of the late-Baroque.

== Biography ==
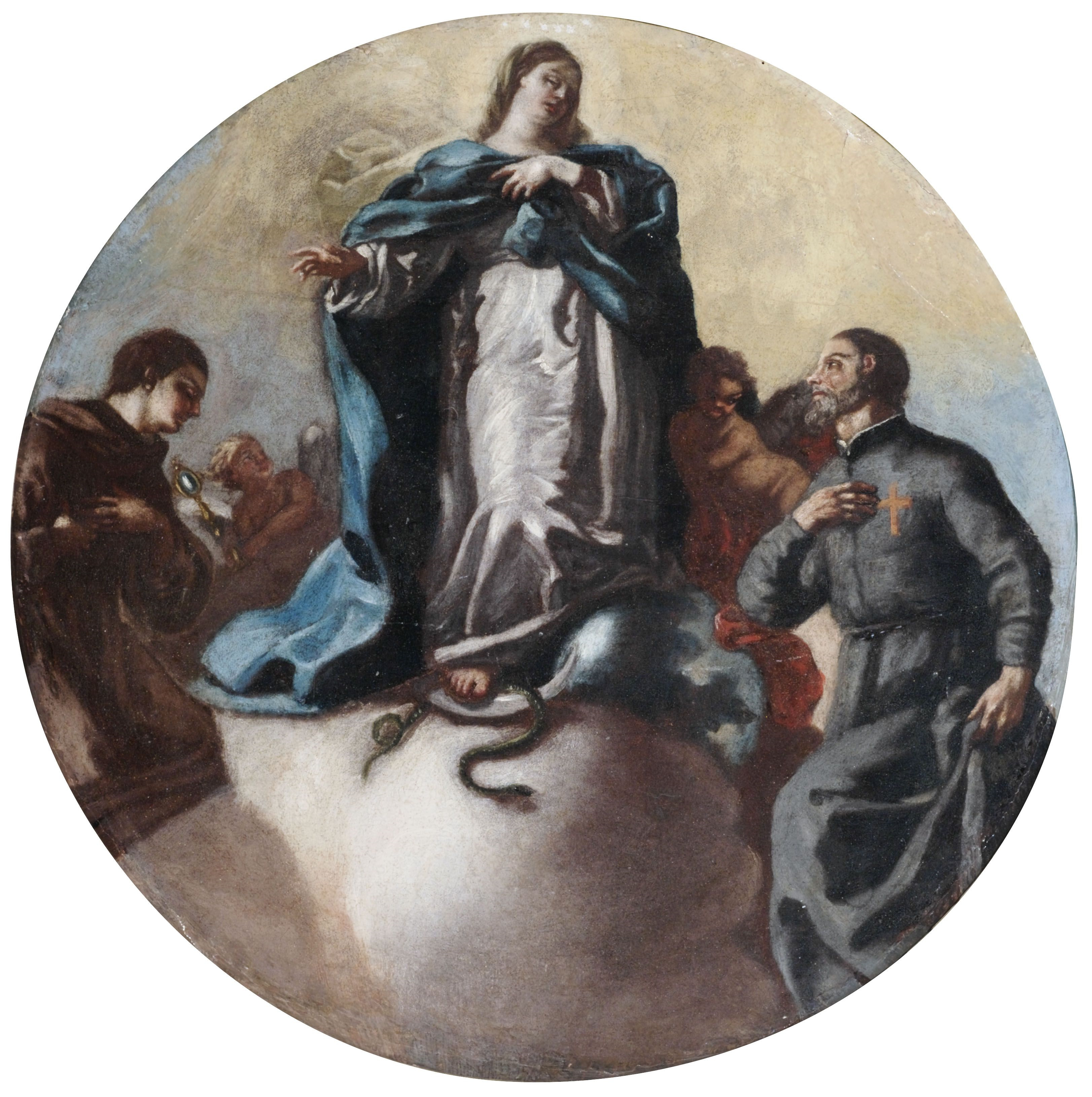
Immaculate Conception with Saints Anthony and Camillo of Lellis, attributed to Olivieri.

He initially trained in his native town of Martina Franca in Puglia, under his uncle. He then moved to Naples to study with Francesco Solimena. By 1715, he was active in Naples, working alongside Gregorio Magli. He died in Naples.

A St Peter Martyr in Glory is on display in the collections of the Pinacoteca Corrado Giaquinto in Bari. He painted a Baptism of Christ for the Nardò Cathedral. A Vision of St Francis of Assisi at the Museo Diocesano of Taranto is attributed to Olivieri. He also painted for the church of Santa Chiara in Nardò. he painted a Madonna dei Pellegrini (1725) for Santa Maria Mater Domini and in the monk's choir of San Gregorio Armeno of Naples. He painted a Madonna and Child with young St John, now in the Pinacoteca Provinciale of Salerno.
