= San Gregorio Armeno =

Church of St. Gregory of Armenia
- Chiesa di San Gregorio Armeno
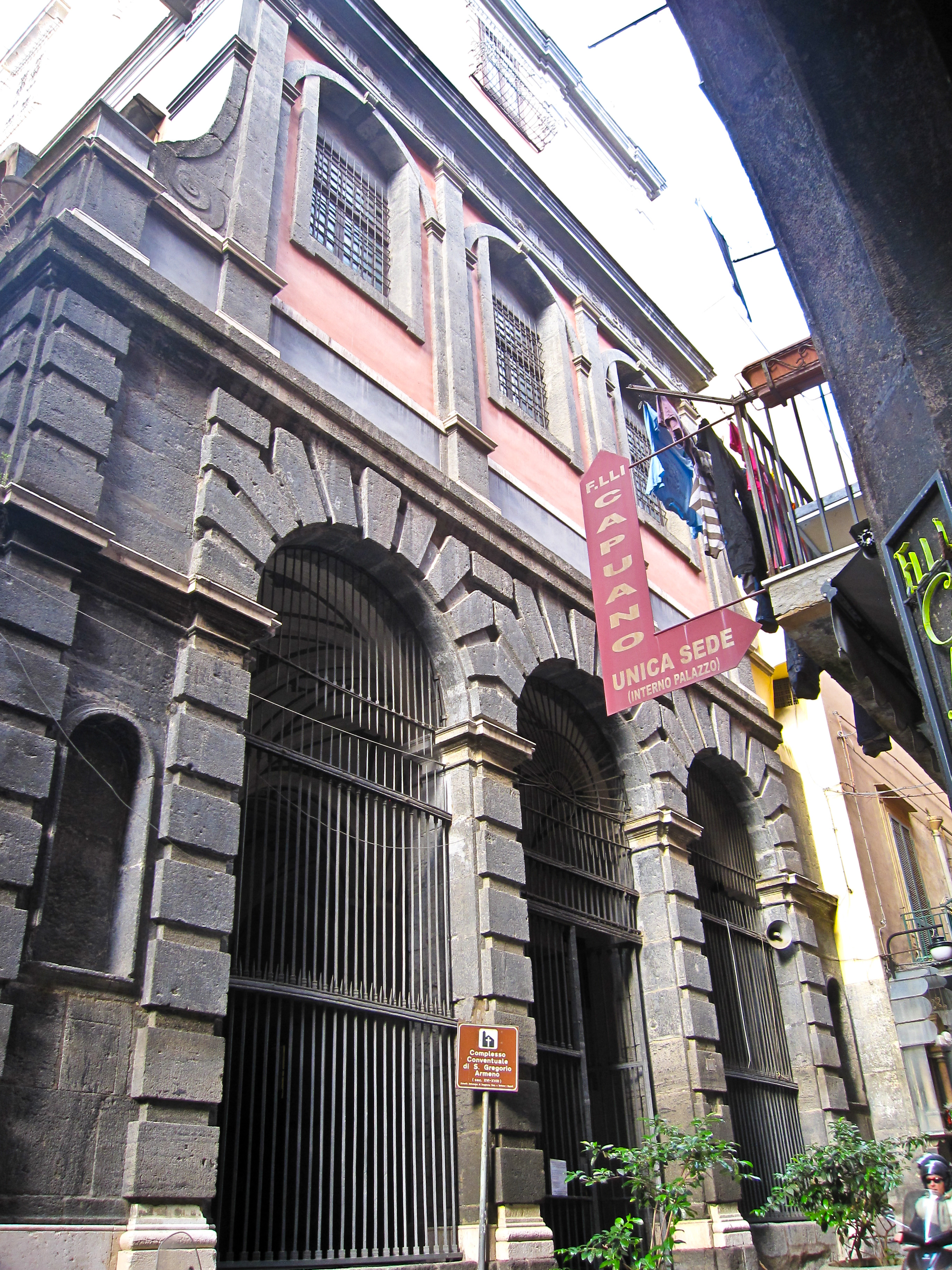
- The façade of San Gregorio Armeno.
- Church of St. Gregory of Armenia
- 40.850175°N 14.257636°E
- Location: Via San Gregorio Armeno, Naples, Campania
- Country: Italy
- Denomination: Roman Catholic

History
- Status: Active

Architecture
- Architectural type: Church
- Style: Baroque architecture
- Groundbreaking: 1572
- Completed: 1687

Administration
- Diocese: Roman Catholic Archdiocese of Naples

San Gregorio Armeno ("St. Gregory the Armenian") is a church and a monastery in Naples, Italy. It is one of the most important Baroque complexes in Naples. The church is located on a street of the same name just south of Via dei Tribunali and a few blocks south of the church of San Paolo Maggiore, Naples.

== History ==
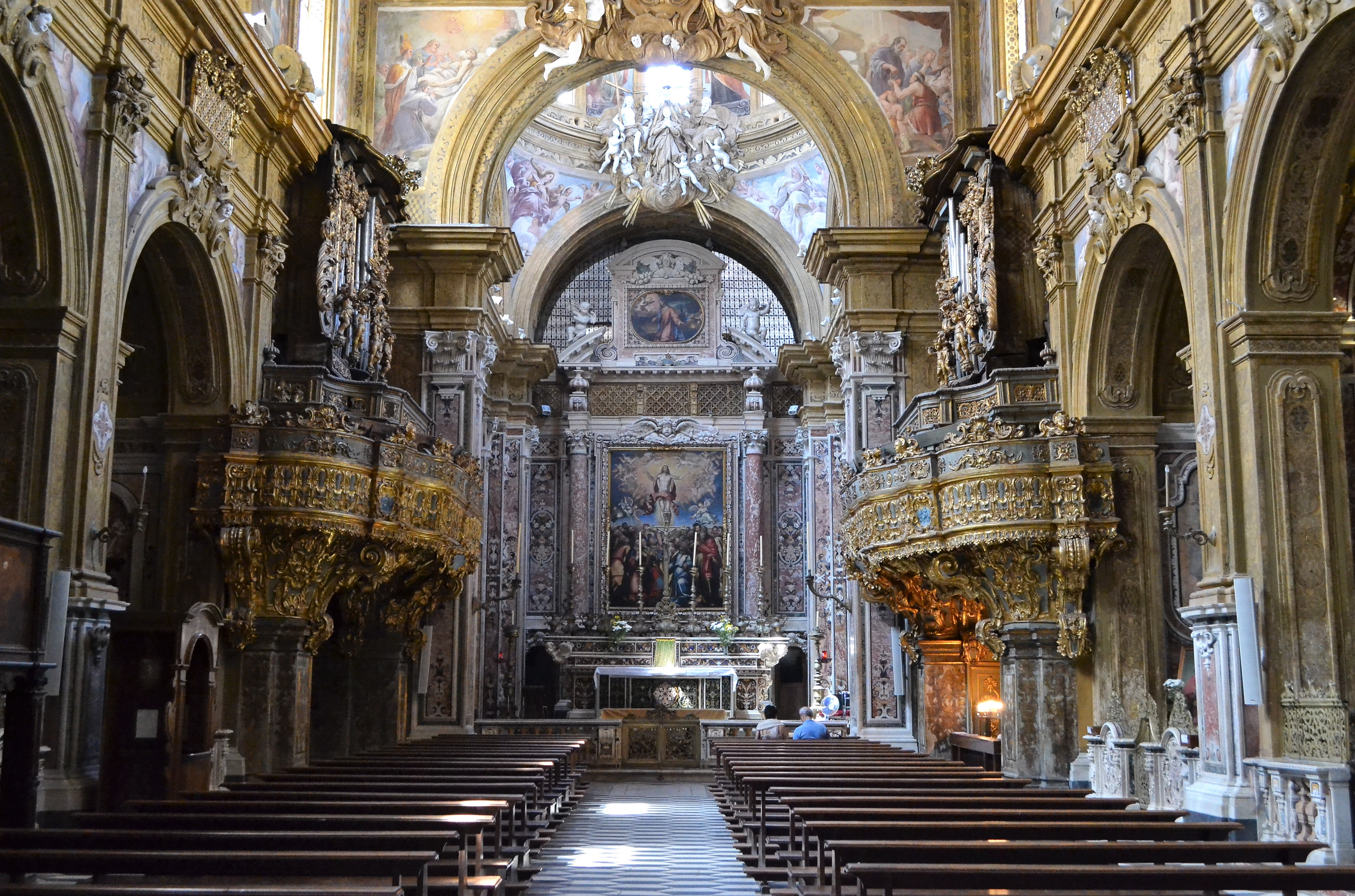
nave

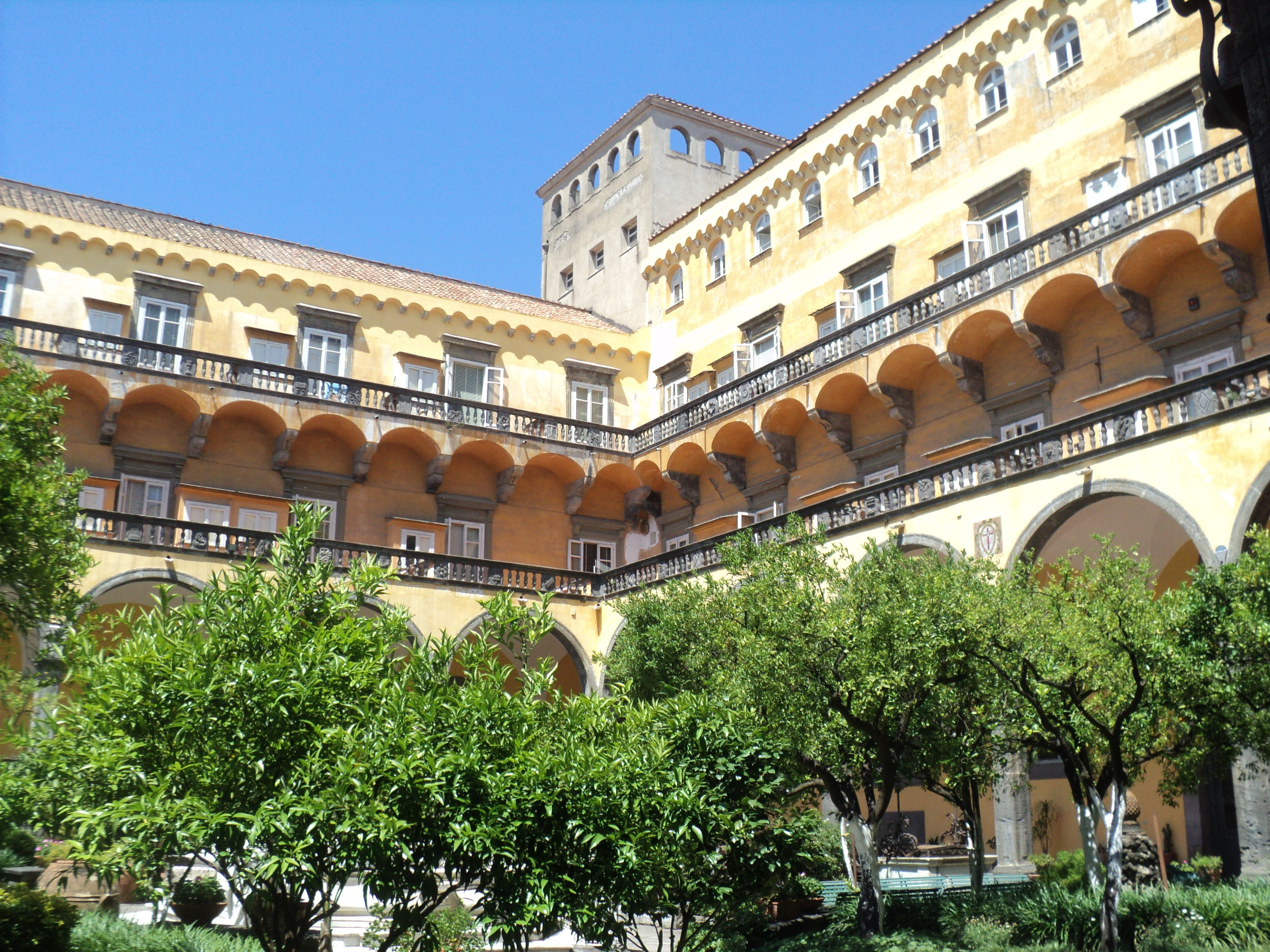
Within the courtyard of the monastery.

In the 8th century, the iconoclast decrees in Greece caused a number of religious orders to flee the Byzantine empire and seek refuge elsewhere. San Gregorio Armeno in Naples was built in the 16th century over the remains of a Roman temple dedicated to Ceres, by a group of nuns escaping from the Byzantine Empire with the relics of St. Gregory, bishop of Armenia. During the Norman domination the monastery was united to that of the Salvatore and San Pantaleone, assuming the Benedictine rule.

The construction of the church was begun in 1574, using designs by Giovanni Battista Cavagni, and consecrated five years later. A later consecration dates to 1674, and refurbishment to 1762. The façade has three arcades surmounted by four pilaster strips in Tuscan order. The interior has a single nave with five side arcades: the decoration, with the exception of the five chapels, was finished by Luca Giordano (also author of the Saints over the windows of the dome) in 1679. Bernardino Lama, likely the son of Giovanni Bernardo Lama, was author of the altarpiece. The interior houses also the famous Holy Staircase, used by the nuns during their penitences.

The cupola was painted with a Glory of San Gregorio by Luca Giordano. The ceiling cassettoni or framed canvases depict the Life of the St Gregorio Armeno and were commissioned by the abbess Beatrice Carafa from the Flemish Teodoro d'Errico. On the right, the altarpieces include an Annunciation of Mary by Pacecco De Rosa, a Virgin of the Rosary by Nicola Malinconico, and frescoes by Francesco Di Maria. On the left, is a St. Benedict altarpiece by Spagnoletto. The main altar was designed by Dionisio Lazzari, and has an altarpiece depicting the Resurrection by Giovanni Bernardo Lama.

The Idria Chapel houses eighteen paintings by Paolo De Matteis, portraying the Life of Mary. Over the chapel's high altar is a medieval icon, in Byzantine style, of the Madonna dell'Idria.

The main attraction is the cloister (1580). In the centre is a marble fountain, decorated with dolphins and other marine creatures, with the statues of "Christ and the Samaritan Woman", by Matteo Bottiglieri.

== See also ==
- 16th-century Western domes

== Bibliography ==
- Regina, Vincenzo (2004). Le chiese di Napoli. Naples: Newton e Compton.
