= San Paolo Maggiore, Naples =

Basilica church in Naples, Italy

Basilica of San Paolo Maggiore Basilica di San Paolo Maggiore (in Italian)
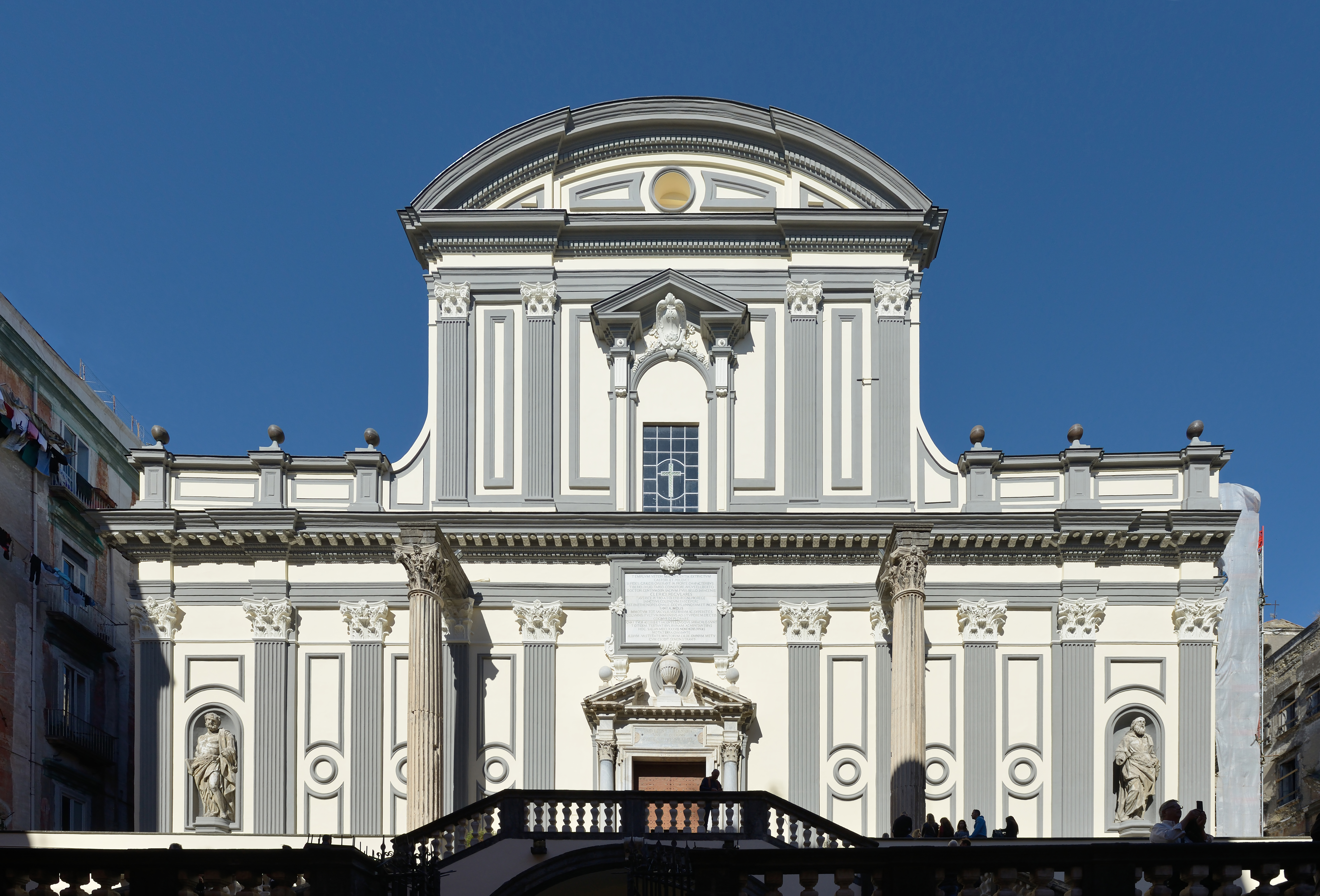
- Façade.

Religion
- Affiliation: Roman Catholic
- Diocese: Archdiocese of Naples
- Ecclesiastical or organisational status: Minor basilica

Location
- Location: Naples, Campania, Italy
- Interactive map of Basilica of San Paolo Maggiore; Basilica di San Paolo Maggiore (in Italian)
- Coordinates: 40.851440°N 14.256830°E

Architecture
- Type: Church
- Style: Baroque

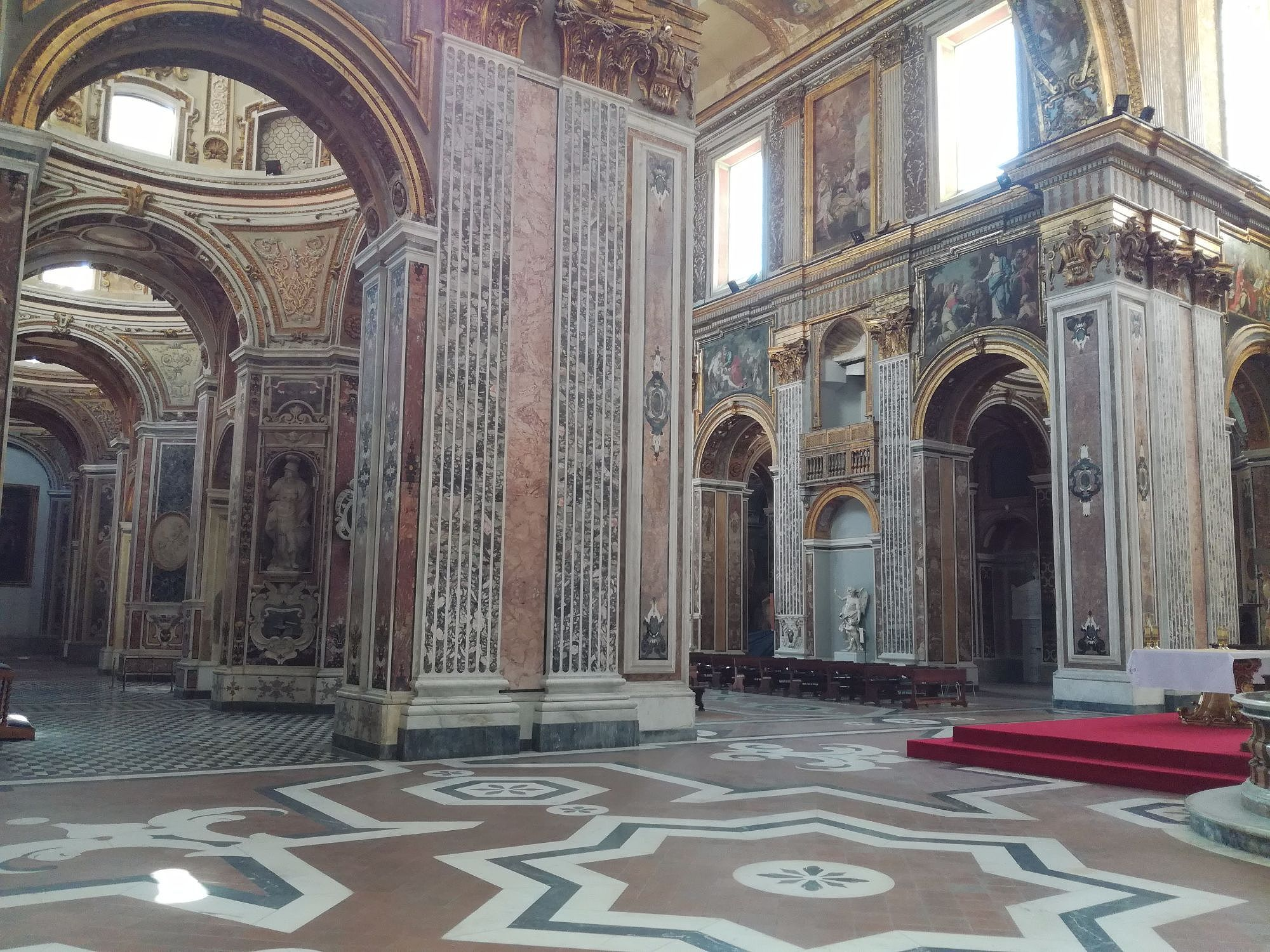
Interior.

San Paolo Maggiore is a basilica church in Naples, southern Italy, and the burial place of Saint Cajetan, founder of the Theatines. It is located on Piazza Gaetano, about 1-2 blocks north of Via dei Tribunali.

== History ==
The Baroque style church is located on the site of the 1st-century temple of the Dioscuri. The church was built upon the ruins of that temple. The church occupied the area behind the temple's pronaos. The front section of the latter, including six columns and triangular tympanum, was visible until 1688, when it was destroyed by an earthquake. The current church includes two corinthian columns from the ancient edifice. They stand awkwardly in front, linked by a fragile beam projecting from the facade. The church erected here in the 8th-9th century was dedicated to St. Paul to celebrate a victory in 574 of the Duchy of Naples against pillaging Saracens.

In 1538, the building was ceded to St Cajetan and his order of Theatines. Cajetan had been in Naples for six years working on building his order. The Theatine priest and architect Francesco Grimaldi designed the adjacent house for the order. In the early 1580s, general reconstruction of the church began with the erection of the transept and the polygonal apse. This was followed by the nave built by Gian Battista Cavagni. The aisles, designed by Giovan Giacomo di Conforto, date from 1625 onwards. As the building was proceeding, it was decorated and embellished, notably by Massimo Stanzione who painted the nave ceiling with a series of canvases depicting events in the life of St Paul. On the occasion of the canonization of the Order's founder, St. Cajetan, Dionisio Lazzaro unsuccessfully connected the façade with the temple's columns with a wall, causing the building to crumble in 1688.

The decoration continued in the 18th century with, among others, Domenico Antonio Vaccaro and Francesco Solimena, who re-used marble elements from the ancient edifice for the new pavement and the pilasters of the nave.

The church was severely damaged by an Allied bombing in 1943, which caused the nearly total destruction of Massimo Stanzione's frescoes.

== Interior ==
The interior is on the Latin cross plan. The nave has remains of Stanzione's frescoes depicting Histories of Sts. Paul and Peter. Other frescoes by Francesco Solimena can be seen in the sacristy. In the nave there is also a statue of the Guardian Angel (1712) by Domenico Antonio Vaccaro. Notable, especially for their marble decorations, are the Chapels of Firrao di Sant'Agata and the Madonna della Purità, both dating from the 17th centuries. The main altar was sculpted in 1775–1776 to a design by Ferdinando Fuga.

== Cloister ==
The cloister was built during the Theatine reconstruction of the late 16th century, occupying the former pagan temple. The vestibule uses columns taken from the former Palaeo-Christian church; the cloister itself has a square plan with, in its center, a well supported by small columns.

The frescoes on the walls, one of which was attributed to Aniello Falcone, have disappeared.

== Photo gallery ==
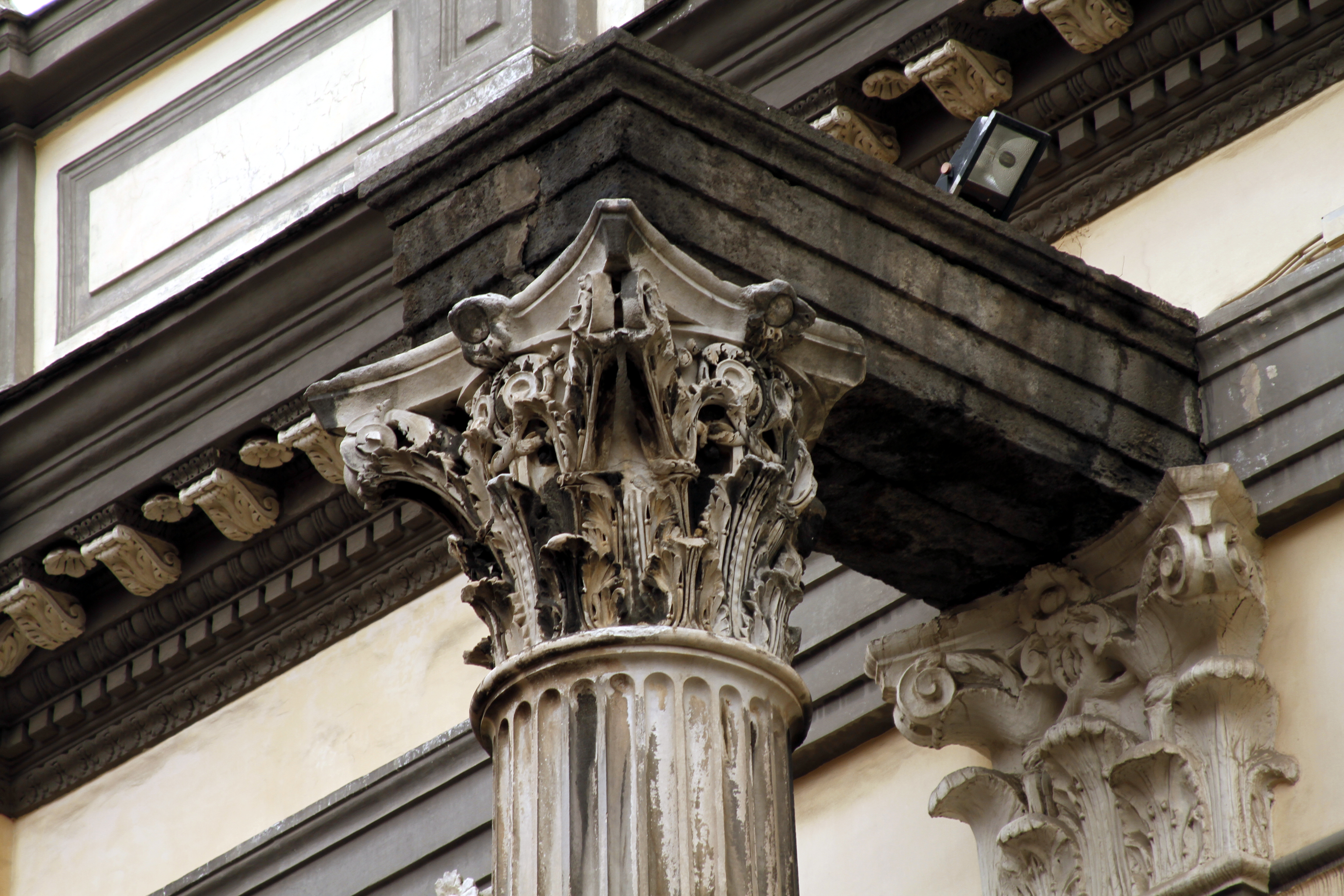
Detail of a Corinthian column

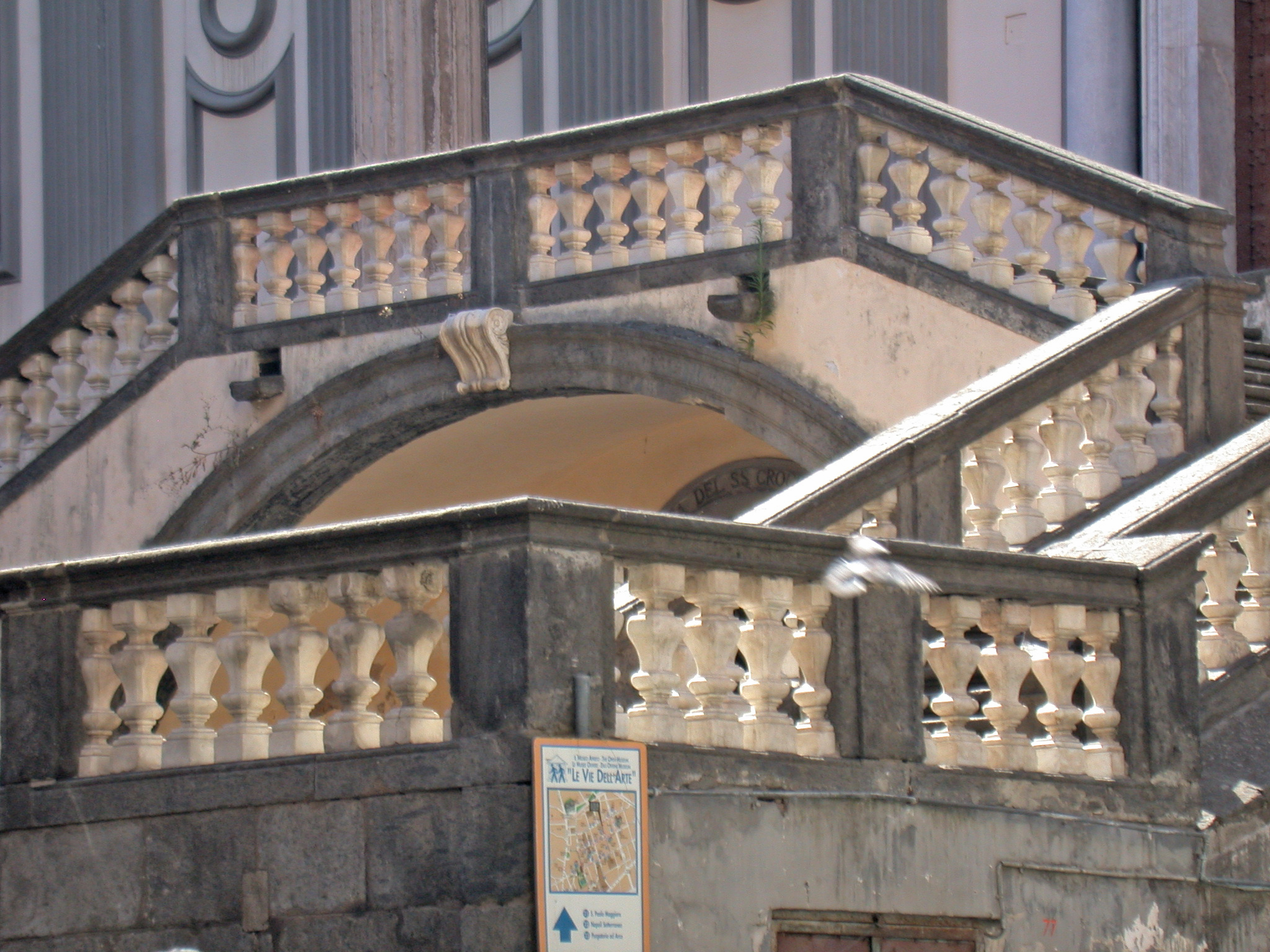
Detail of the main exterior staircase

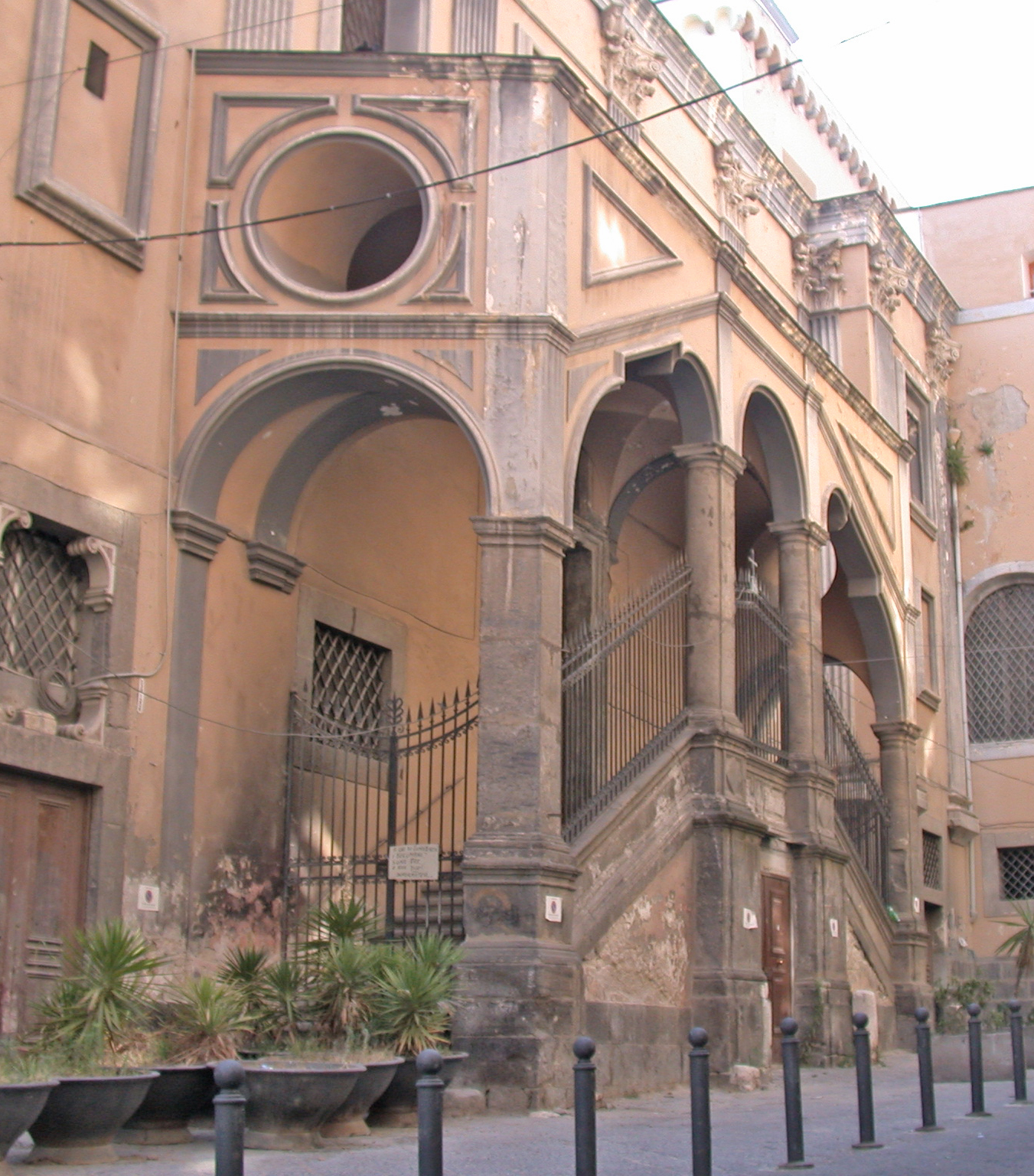
The side stairway

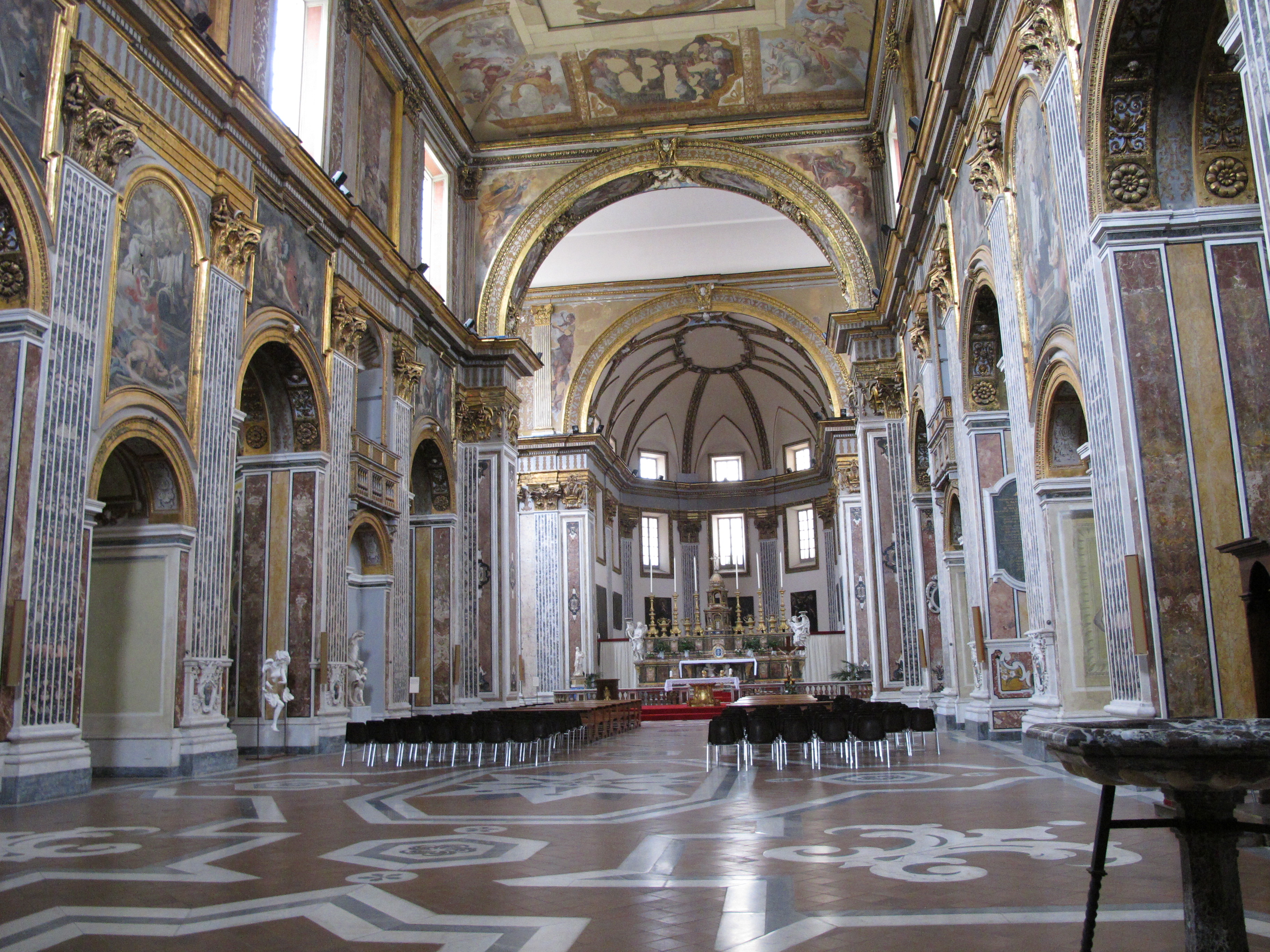
The central nave

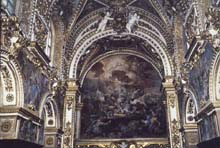
Interior detail

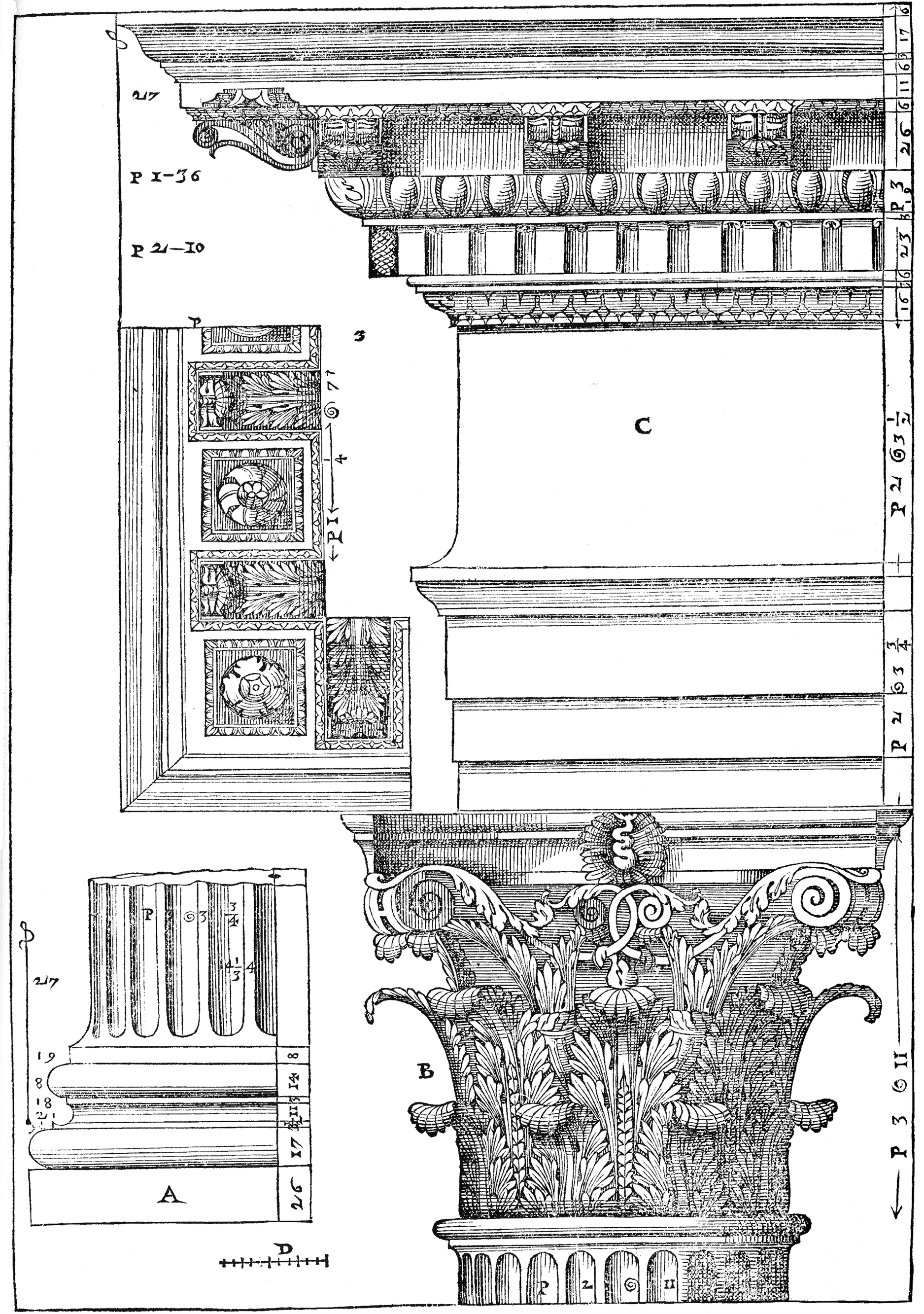
Architectural details from the Temple of the Dioscuri from Andrea Palladio, Four Books on Architecture, Venice 1570.

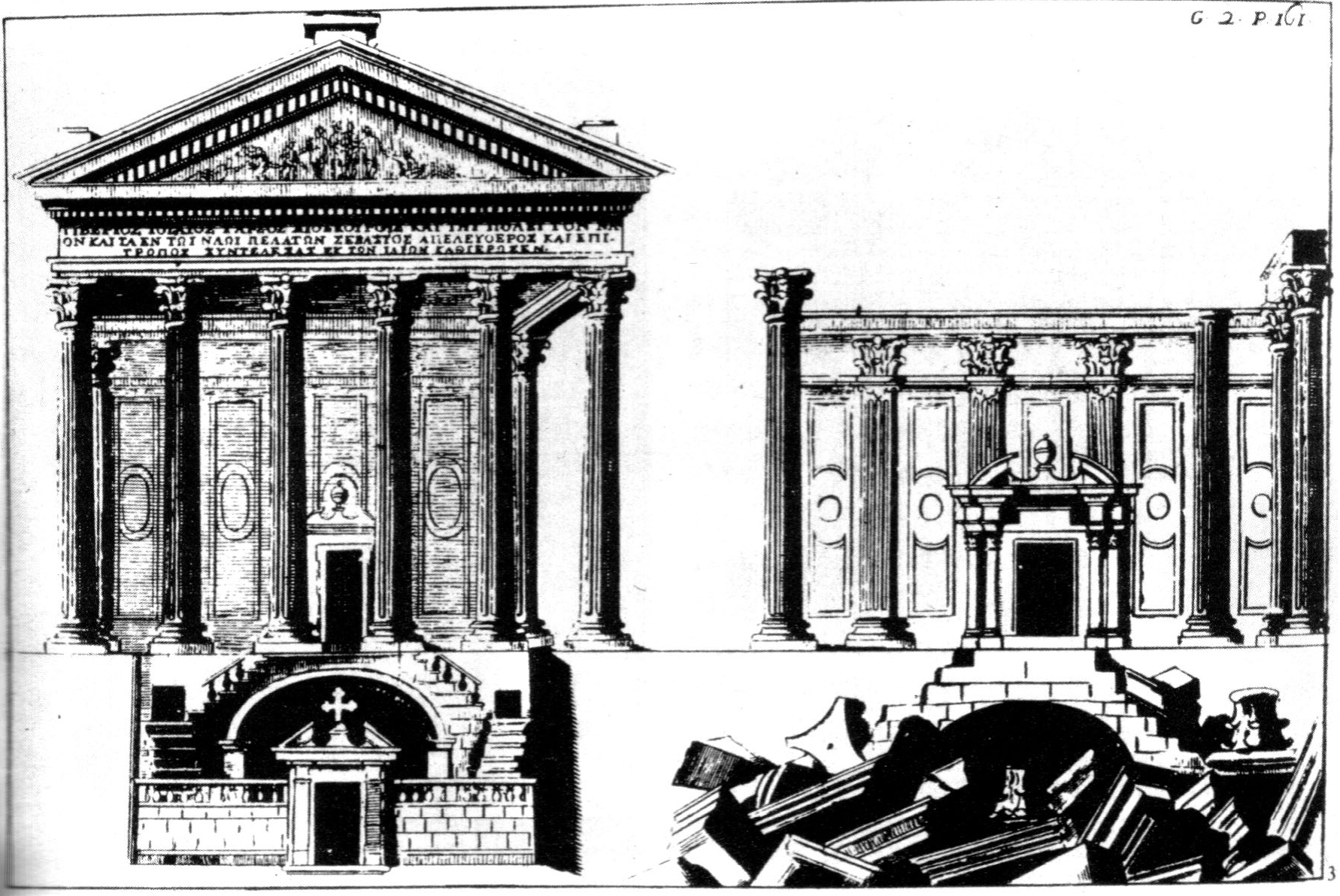
The facade of San Paolo Maggiore before and after the collapse of 1688 (from Celano 1692)

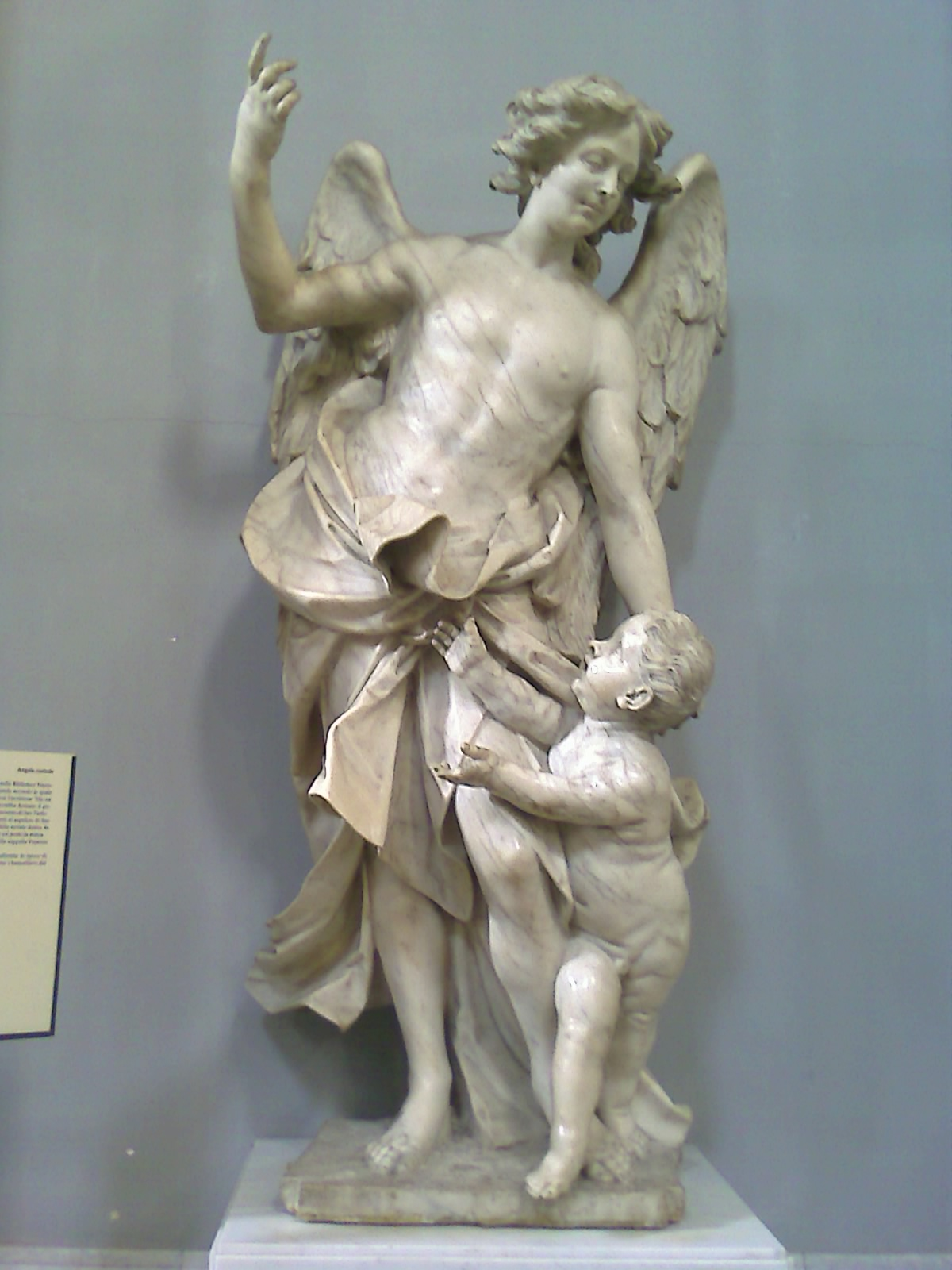
Angel statue by Vaccaro

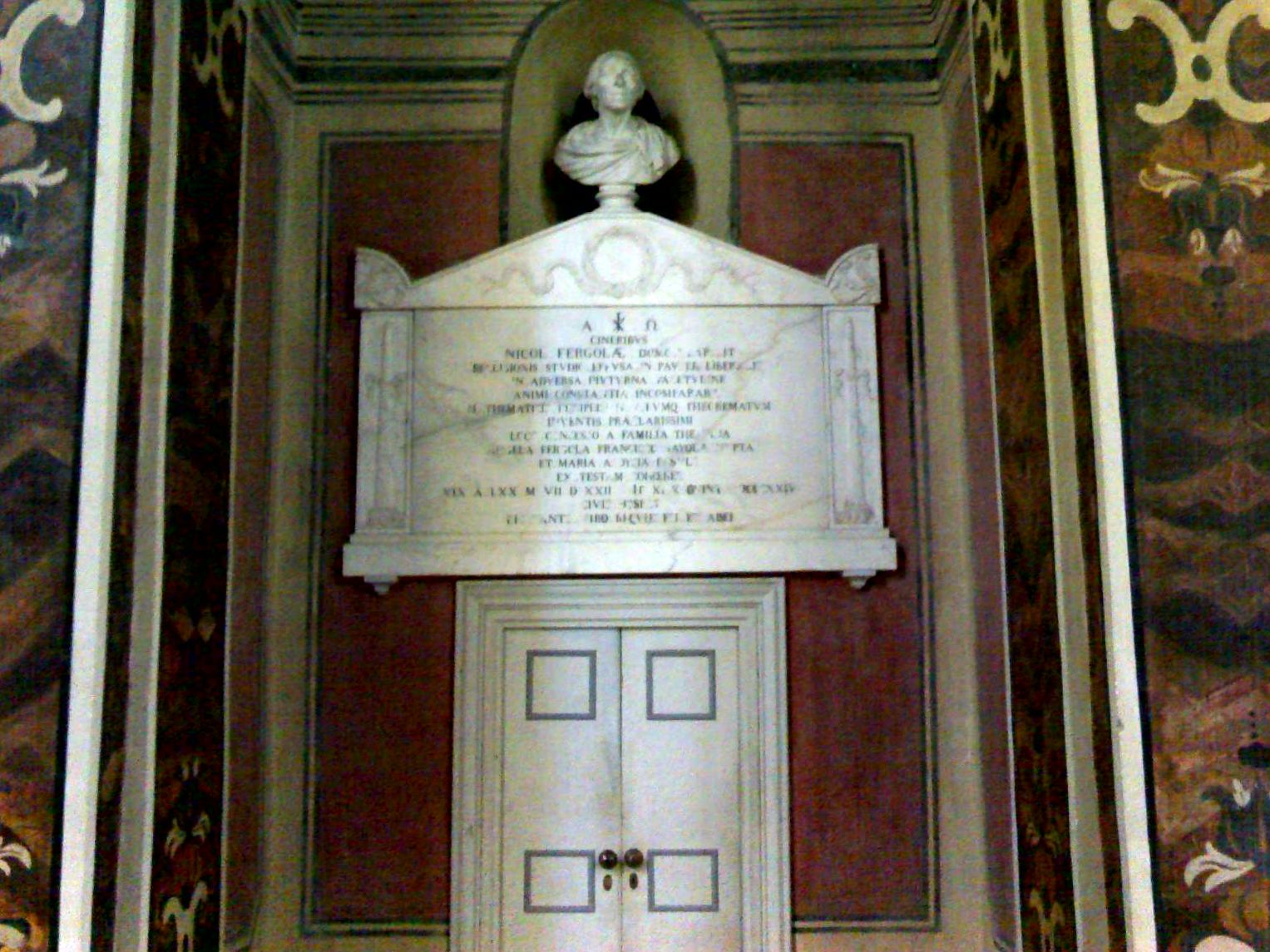
Burial monument of the Italian mathematician Nicola Fergola (1753–1828)

== Sources ==
- Blunt, Anthony (1975). Architettura barocca e rococò a Napoli. London.
- Costa, Maria Rosaria (1996). I Chiostri di Napoli. Rome: Newton & Compton. ISBN 88-8183-553-3.
- Ruotolo, Renato (1988). "Documenti sulla chiesa napoletana di S. Paolo Maggiore". Scritti di Storia dell'arte in onore di Raffaello Causa. Naples. pp. 297–304.
