= Nicola Malinconico =

Italian painter (1663–1721)

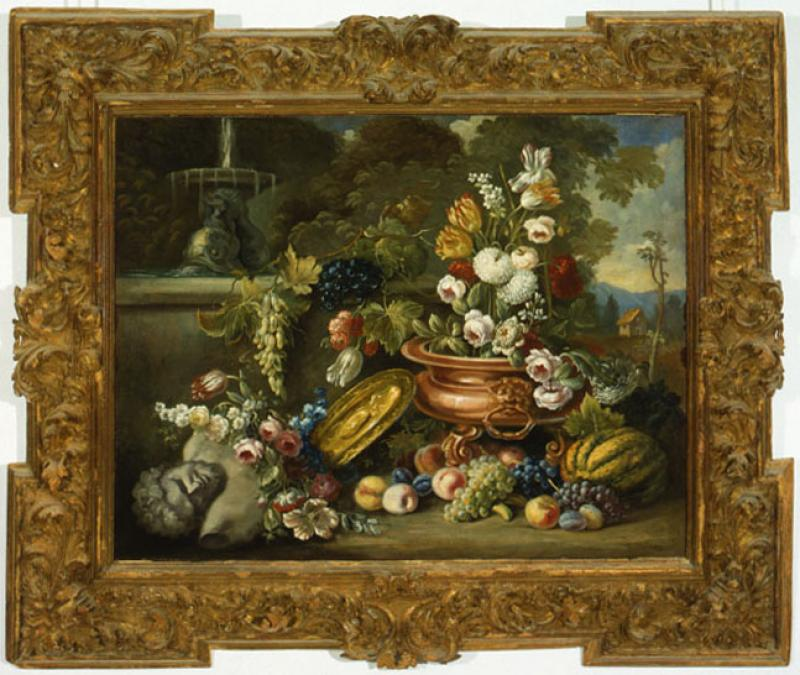
Nicola Malinconico, Still life, oil on canvas, Pinacoteca metropolitana di Bari.

Nicola Malinconico (1663–1721) was a Neapolitan painter of the late-Baroque. He is described as a follower of Luca Giordano, and painted mostly religious canvases. He painted the chapel altarpieces for the church of St Michele Arcangelo in Anacapri. He also painted still life paintings recalling work by Pietro Paolo Bonzi and Paolo Porpora and influenced by the Flemish still life painter David de Coninck.

Around 1700, he was commissioned by bishop Oronzo Filomarino to decorate the cathedral of Gallipoli in the province of Lecce. He completed large canvases of Christ clearing the moneylenders from the temple in the counter-facade; Entry into Jerusalem, Miracle of the lame, Burial of Saint Agatha. On the ceiling he painted Saint Agatha stops the Eruption of the Etna volcano; Saint Agatha visits St. Peter in jail; the Glory of Saint Agatha, Trial and condemnation of Saint Agatha (1715), and Martyrdom of Saint Sebastian. A second cycle of paintings was completed with the help of his son Carlo.

== Sources ==
- Nicola Malinconico at Artcyclopedia
- B. Painting and Sculpture. Oreste Ferrari The Burlington Magazine (1979) p 263.

Achille della Ragione - Nicola Malinconico pittore di natura morta - Napoli 2009
