= Luigi Rodriguez =

Italian painter

Luigi Rodriguez, also called Luigi Roderico (active early 17th century) was a Spanish-Italian painter, active in Naples, Italy.

He is described by De Dominici as a pupil under Belisario Corenzio. He painted canvases in the church of Santa Maria La Nova, Naples. He was born to Spanish parents, and is documented to have children born 1601-1610. Documents suggest his brother was a Spanish soldier.
