= Chapel of the Congregation of Monte dei Poveri =

Building in Naples, Italy

Coordinates: 40.847980°N 14.253870°E

The Chapel of the Congregation of Monte dei Poveri (Cappella della Congregazione di Monte dei Poveri) is a Baroque-style chapel located on Via Tribunali in central Naples, Italy. The chapel is closed for services.

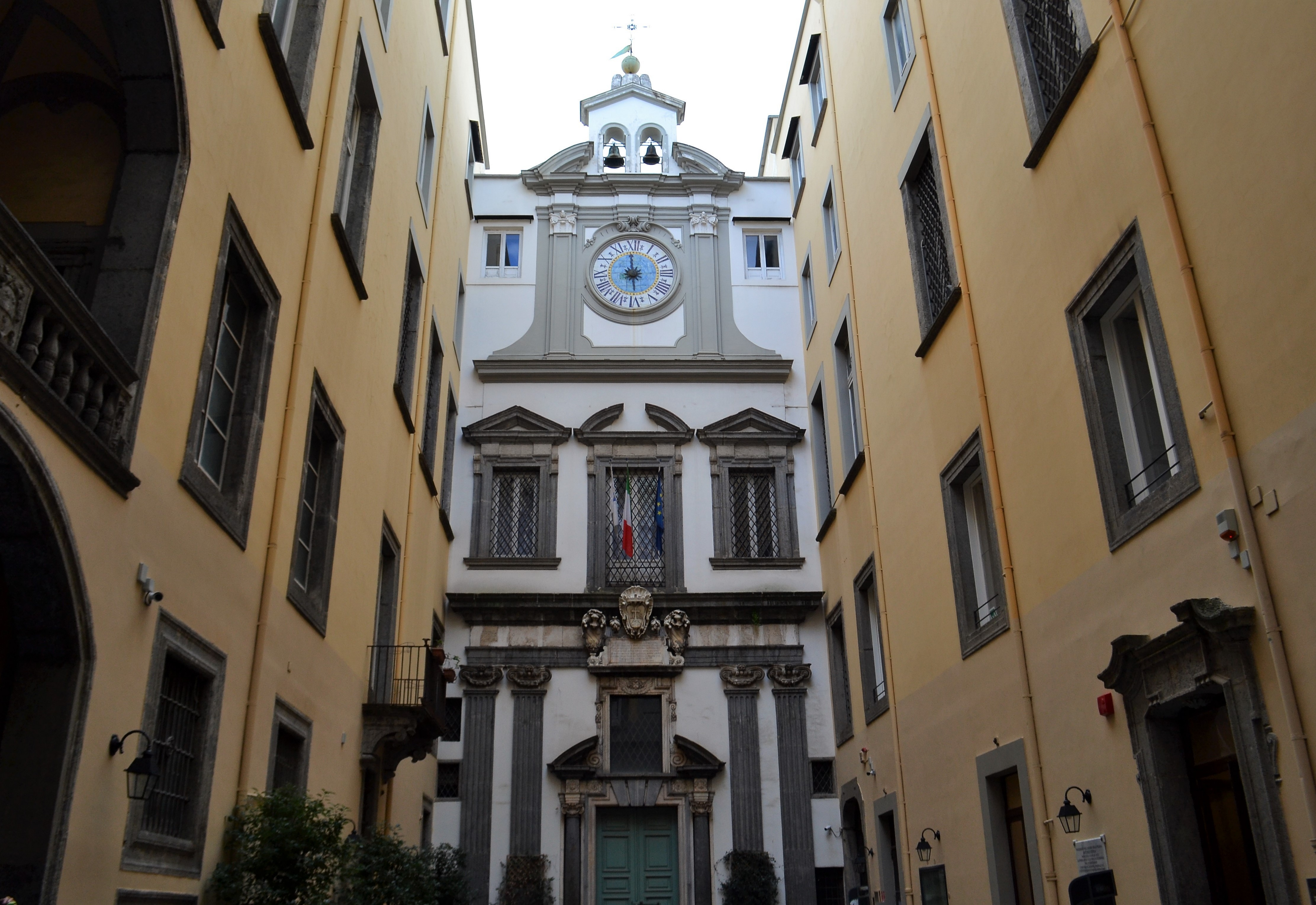
Facade from courtyard of Palazzo Ricca

The chapel is located inside the courtyard of the Palazzo Ricca, formerly the offices of the Monte dei Poveri, and now the offices of the historic archives of the Fondazione of the Istituto Banco di Napoli.

The chapel was designed in 1663 by Don Giuseppe Caracciolo. The atrium has sculptures by Girolamo D'Auria, depicting Saints Thomas Acquinus, Januarius, and Anthony of Padua, and a canvas depicting the Holy Family by Giannantonio D’Amato. The main altar was designed in 1768 by Filippo Fasulo and completed in polychrome marble with sculptural decorations by Paolo Persico. The main altar has three paintings, a Circumcision (1673) by Luca Giordano and an Annunciation and Nativity by Francesco Solimena. The ceiling has an Immaculate Conception frescoed also by Giordano. The organ was completed in 1685 and restored in 1726.

The facade was rebuilt in the 1700s using designs by Gaetano Barba and in 1751, the majolica clock and bell tower was added.
