= Palazzo Ricca, Naples =

Palace in Campania, Italy

Coordinates: 40.852759°N 14.262964°E

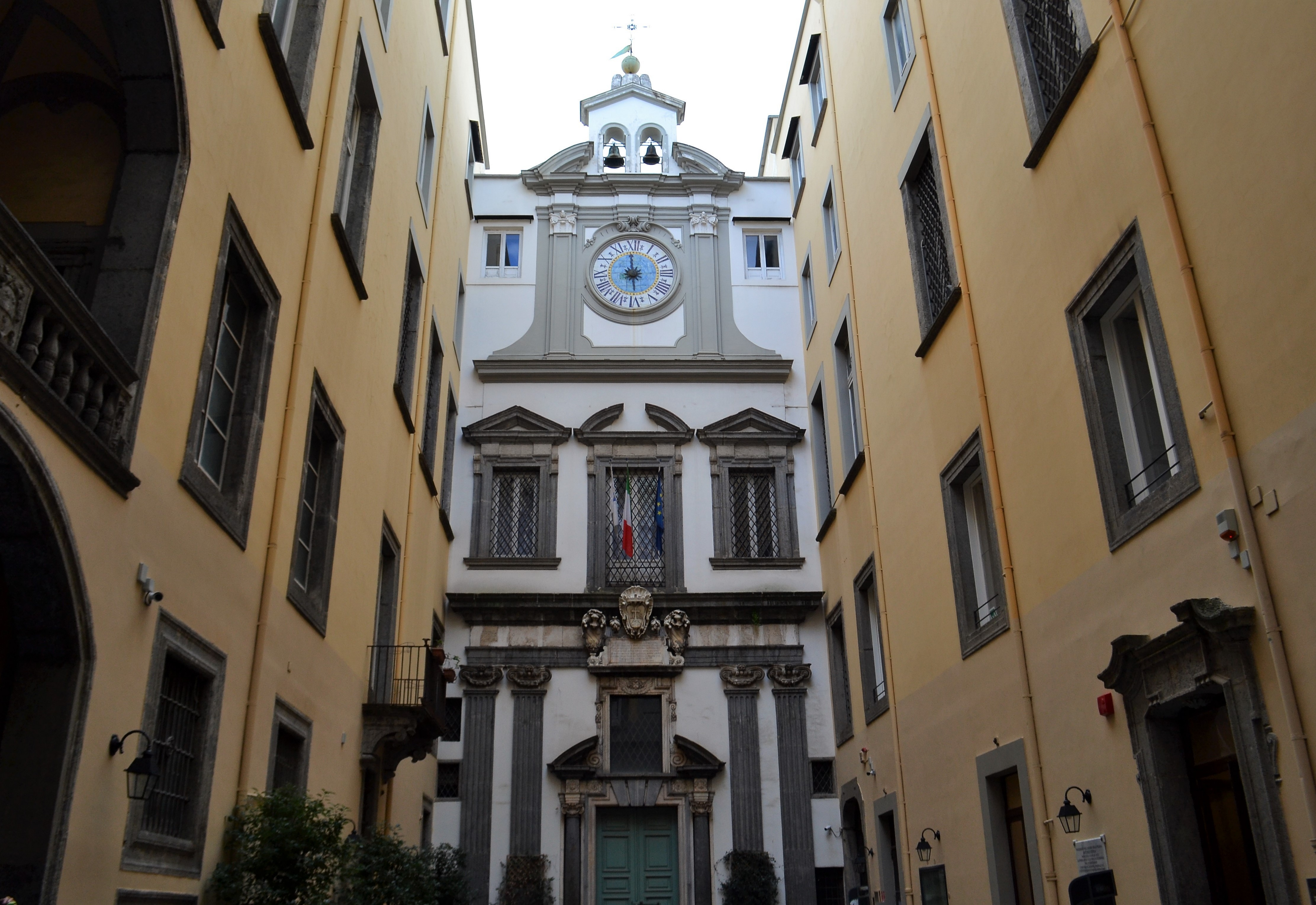

The Palazzo Ricca is a monumental palace, located on the southernmost end of Via dei Tribunali #213, in central Naples, region of Campania, Italy. It presently houses the archives of the Foundation of the Istituto Banco di Napoli. The palace is just down the street from the entrance to Castel Capuano

== History ==
The palace once housed the Banco dei Poveri (Bank of the Poor) arose between the sixteenth century in Naples, and along with nearly eight other such institutions, it was later consolidated into the Banco di Napoli. These institutions served as pawnshops, almshouses, and in the case of the Banco dei Poveri, the proximity to the courts at the Vicaria (Castel Capuano) meant that they often serves as bails-bondsmen. A story, perhaps apocryphal, by Carlo Cerano about the origins of the bank support the latter function. The bank staff was composed of lay religious congregations, and its funds were amassed through alms, income from rental properties, and donations, in the latter case, often of inheritances. The Neapolitan Banco dei Poveri was in competition with the Neapolitan Monte di Pietà - the first Monte in Naples, built in 1539, which made loans without charging interest, to avoid usury injunctions.

The palace now houses the historical archives of the Banco di Napoli. The palace was bought for nearly 10,000 ducats by the Monte e Banco dei Poveri in 1616 from Gaspare Ricca. In 1787, the adjacent palace was bought from the heirs of Don Pietro Cuomo. The palace was restructured by Giovanni Conforto, and underwent a number of reconstructions. The present late-Baroque facade was designed by Gaetano Barba. The architect Ferdinando Sanfelice designed the interlacing staircases seen in the courtyard. The Chapel of the Congregation of Monte dei Poveri (Cappella della Congregazione di Monte dei Poveri) in the courtyard was designed in 1663 by Don Giuseppe Caracciolo. Nicola Trabucco completed the frescoes in the Audience Hall of the palace, and restored five canvases by Belisario Corenzio. These latter paintings have been moved. Giacinto Diano frescoed the Council Hall. Other decorations were completed by Gaetano d’Aveta.
