= Cabal of Naples =

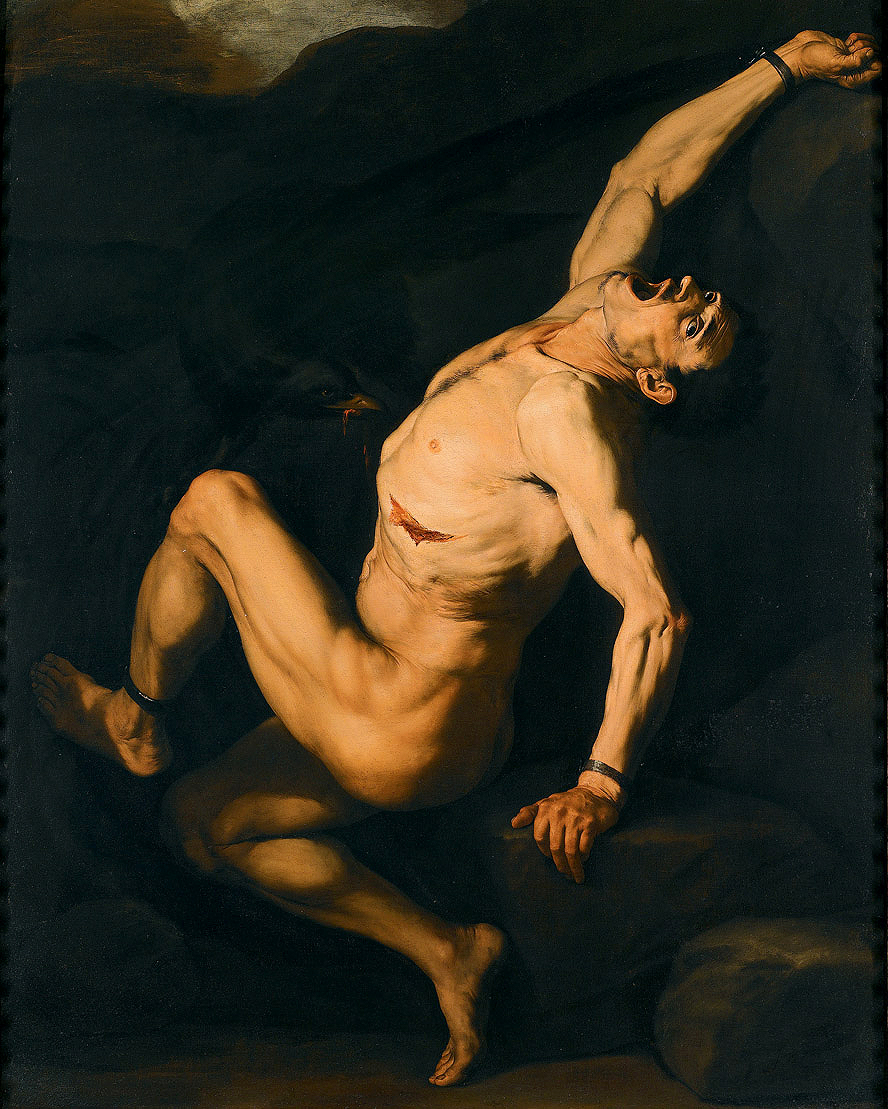
Jusepe de Ribera, Prometheus, c. 1630

The Cabal of Naples was a notorious triumvirate of painters in the city of Naples that operated during the early Baroque period from the late 1610s to the early 1640s. It was led by the Spaniard Jusepe de Ribera, who had established himself in Naples after fleeing creditors in Rome in 1616, and also consisted of the Neapolitan Battistello Caracciolo and Greek Belisario Corenzio. Its primary goal was to prevent competition from artists from other parts of Italy, particularly the masters. Its activities often targeted the followers of Annibale Carracci, but also any artist not native to Naples. It involved the triumvirate in leading the painters of the city to harass, expel, or poison any non-native painter, and only ended with the death of Caracciolo in 1635.

== Art commissions in Naples ==
According to the art historian Bernardo de Dominici, no major commission for art in Naples could be executed without the consent of the three painters. Artists who did so would be persecuted or threatened with violence, and often their in-progress works would be destroyed or sabotaged. Many artists were invited to Naples for a commission to decorate the Cappella del Tesoro, the chapel of the Naples Cathedral. The chapel honours Saint Januarius and is considered the holiest shrine in Naples. It is known for The Blood Miracle, the reputed liquefaction of the saint's blood, which is stored in a phial and had purportedly been obtained by a woman named Eusebia just after the saint's death. Artists including Annibale Carracci, the Cavalier d'Arpino, and Guido Reni all accepted an invitation to work on the chapel. All of them found Naples inhospitable. In 1621, Reni's assistant was so badly wounded that he returned to Rome. Corenzio was arrested as a suspect in the crime, but released because of insufficient evidence against him. Carracci was so maligned that he could not obtain a commission in the city.

The artists commissioned for this work were driven away as a result of the cabal's jealousy and resentment at the intrusion of outsiders to work on such an important project. A group from Naples known as the Santafede was hired by the commissioners, but that group's work did not impress the commissioners, who ultimately hired Corenzio. His work was found to be unacceptable by the commissioners, and was removed. The commissioners sent a letter to Domenichino in Rome requesting his services. On 23 March 1630, Domenichino sent a reply letter to accept a commission to decorate the Cappella del Tesoro, though he had reservations about accepting the commission, and his wife had attempted to dissuade him from accepting it.

== Domenichino ==
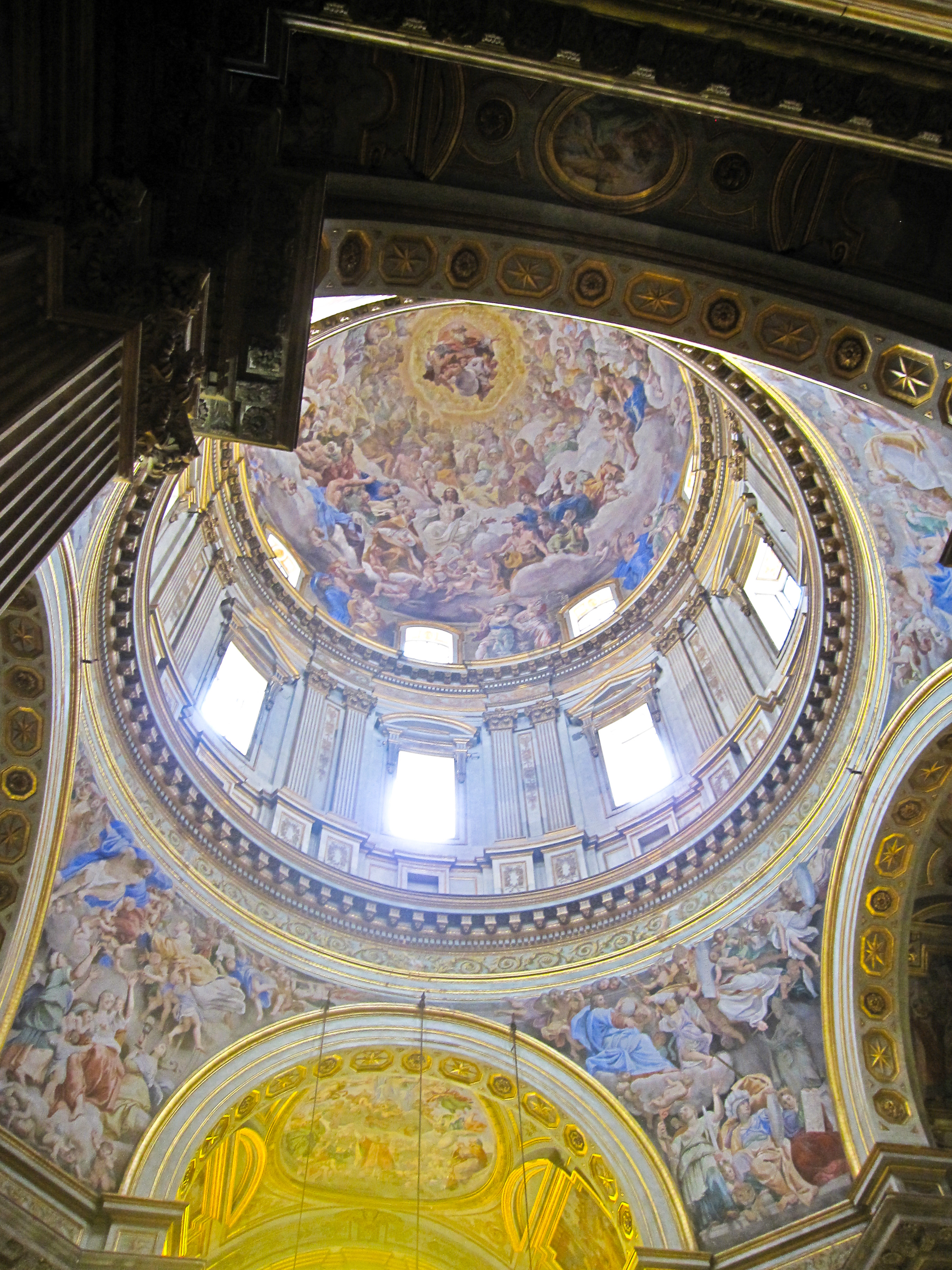
Domenichino's frescoes in the dome of the Cappella del Tesoro

Domenichino completed several frescoes in San Carlo ai Catinari by June 1630, and moved to Naples in November. Not long after he arrived, he received a death threat warning him to abandon the commission. He requested protection from the Viceroy of Naples, and despite assurances that he would be safe, rarely left his home except to work at the chapel or at the school he had opened. He would often arrive at the chapel for work to find the previous night's work had been rubbed out. He was so tormented by the cabal that in 1634 he fled to Frascati, not yet having completed the commission, and became a guest at Villa Aldobrandini, the villa of the Aldobrandini family. The representatives of the Naples Cathedral who had hired him did their utmost to convince Domenichino to return. Upon learning of Domenichino's flight from the city, the viceroy arrested his wife and daughter, who had remained in Naples, and sequestered his property. Domenichino returned to Naples in 1635 to continue his work on the cathedral, but by then no longer had the favour or protection of the viceroy. His wife and daughter were released upon his return. In 1637, he accepted a commission for nine frescoes for the chapel, and in 1640 he received payment for a work about the martyrdom of Saint Januarius.

According to journal entries by Giovanni Battista Passeri, Domenichino feared that his meals would be poisoned, or that he would be stabbed. On 3 April 1641, he wrote a will; he died on 15 April after several days of illness. His widow was convinced he had been poisoned, and it was suspected that the cabal was responsible.

== See also ==
- Baroque! From St Peter's to St Paul's

== Bibliography ==
- Collins, Neil (2015). "Painting in Naples (c.1600–1700): 17th Century Neapolitan Baroque Art by Caravaggio, Ribera and others". Encyclopedia of Art History (Online ed.). [See § "How Ribera's Cabal Controled [sic] Painting in Naples".]
- Hoffmann, Ernst Theodore Amadeus (1885). Weird Tales. C. Scribner's Sons.
- Landon, Charles Paul (1823). The works of Domenichino Zampieri. E. Evans.
- MacFall, Haldane (2004). A History of Painting: Later Italians and Genius of Spain. Vol. 3. Kessinger Publishing. ISBN 1417945087.
- Viardot, Louis (1877). An illustrated history of painters of all schools. Sampson, Low, Marston, Searle, & Rivington.
- Wornum, Ralph Nicholson (1847). The Epochs of Painting Characterized: A Sketch of the History of Painting, Ancient and Modern, showing its gradual and various development from the earliest ages to the present time. London, GBR: C. Cox.
- Wornum, Ralph Nicholson & The National Gallery (1870). Descriptive and Historical Catalogue of the Pictures in the National Gallery: with Biographical Notices of the Painters. Foreign Schools (55th ed.). London: Her Majesty's Stationery Office.
