= Andrea di Leone =

Italian painter

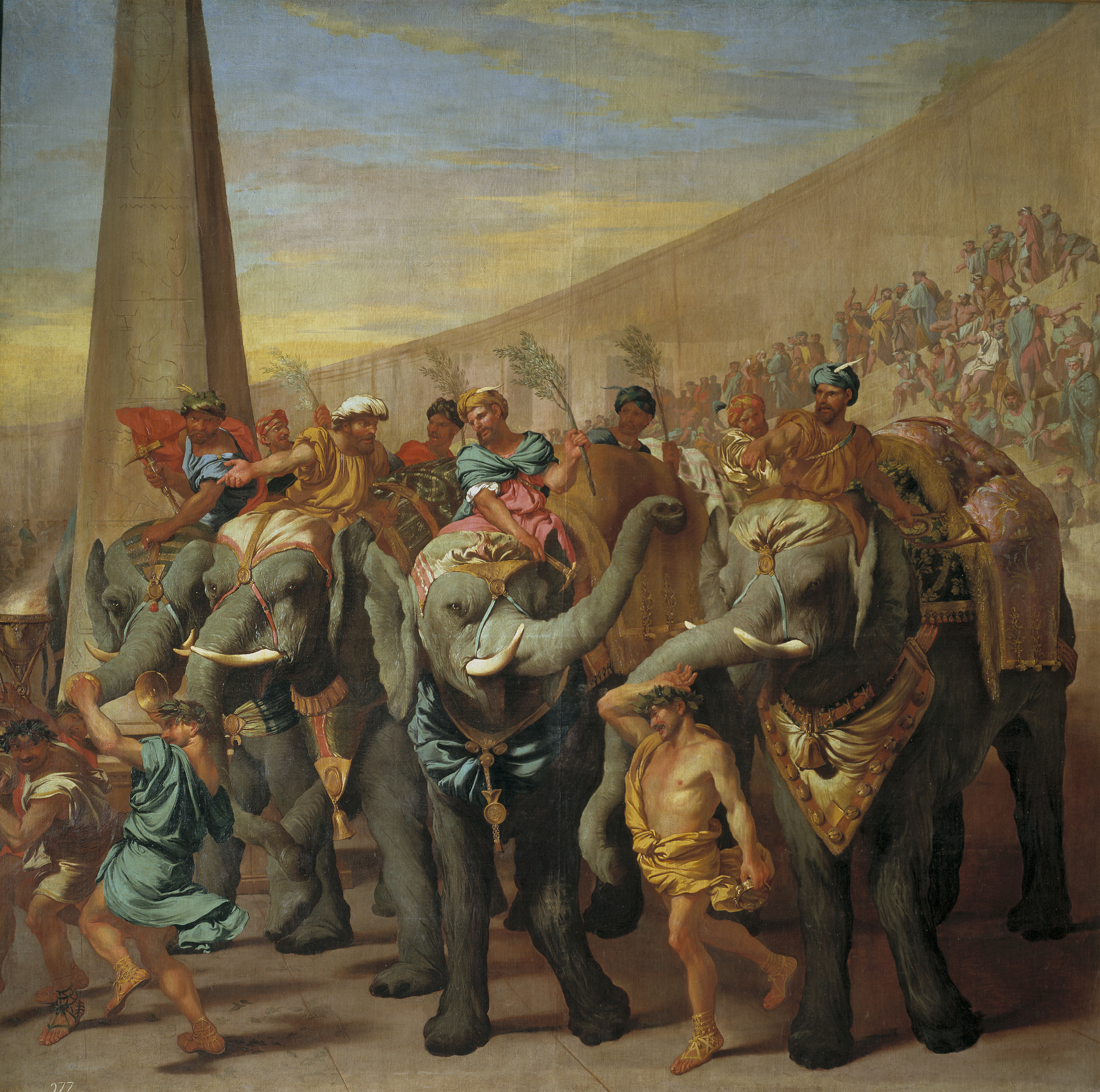
- Elephants in a Roman Circus, c. 1635–1640, Museo del Prado, Madrid
- Born: 8 September 1610; Naples, Kingdom of Naples
- Died: 12 February 1685 (aged 74); Naples, Kingdom of Naples
- Education: Belisario Corenzio; Salvator Rosa; Aniello Falcone
- Movement: Baroque

Andrea di Leone (8 September 1610 – 12 February 1685) was an Italian painter of the Baroque period, active in his native city of Naples.

== Biography ==
Andrea di Leone was born in Naples on 8 September 1610. He was a pupil of Belisario Corenzio and Salvator Rosa. Still very young, he collaborated with Corenzio on frescoes of battle scenes for the palace of the Viceroy. When Corenzio left Naples, Leone became his successor in his work for the palace. Attracted by the painting style of Aniello Falcone, he entered latter's studio, where he received a rigorous academic training. In the late 1630s he contributed, together with several other Neapolitan painters, to the decoration of the Buen Retiro Palace in Spain.

Leone’s art was deeply influenced by that of Giovanni Benedetto Castiglione, whom he may have met during Castiglione’s visit to Naples in 1635, and whom he probably met again in Rome in the 1640s; the relationship between their art was both complex and long lasting. The Voyage of Jacob by Castiglione (1633; New York, priv. col.) inspired a group of works by Leone, particularly his signed Voyage of Jacob (1635–40; Vienna, Kunsthistorisches Museum), an elegant and romantic rendering of an Old Testament scene, enriched by animals, still-life and genre details, and set in a warmly coloured and softly atmospheric landscape. This and other works suggest so strong a debt to both Castiglione and the Venetianizing elements in Nicolas Poussin’s early work, to which Castiglione himself responded, that it has been suggested that Leone travelled to Rome and became one of the circle of artists who gathered around Poussin and Pietro Testa. The date of the visit is unclear, but it may have been in the mid-1630s, or between 1642 and 1644.

In 1647 Lione produced a signed and dated portrait of the rebel leader Masaniello (Rome, Nicolo Castellino priv. col.) and after Masaniello’s revolt he left Naples for a period (de Dominici) and may have visited Rome. Other works, while still indebted to Castiglione, show the influence of Poussin’s more classical style and reveal an awareness of other French artists working in Rome, such as Sébastien Bourdon and Charles Mellin. Outstanding among these is Tobit Burying the Dead (early 1640s; New York, Metropolitan Museum of Art), related to which are a group of drawings (e.g. London, Courtauld Institute Galleries; Cleveland, Cleveland Museum of Art) and a print by Castiglione, and four drawings by Leone (Berlin, Kupferstichkabinett; London, Victoria and Albert Museum; Naples, Museo di Capodimonte; Sacramento, Crocker Art Museum), which suggest a complex relationship between the two artists. Yet the final picture, in which the figures are arranged in a frieze-like group before an architectural landscape, is more austere than Castiglione and closer to the ordered compositions of Poussin.

Leone’s later works probably include Venus and Adonis (mid-1650s; New York, Mario Lan priv. col.), a romantic and very freely painted work, which echoes the poetry of Poussin’s most lyrical mythological scenes, and Jacob’s Journey (1666; Madrid, Museo del Prado), again dependent on Castiglione. Five frescoes of scenes from the Life of St. Athanasius, signed and dated 1677 (Naples Cathedral, Cappella Galeota), survive in a ruinous condition. Leone was also a still-life painter, and his works in this genre include a signed Still-life (Geneva, priv. col.) and two Still-lifes with Fruit (Musée des Beaux-Arts de Pau). Leone died in Naples on 12 February 1685.

== Gallery ==
Andrea di Leone

Adoration of the Golden Calf, after Poussin, Legion of Honor, San Francisco

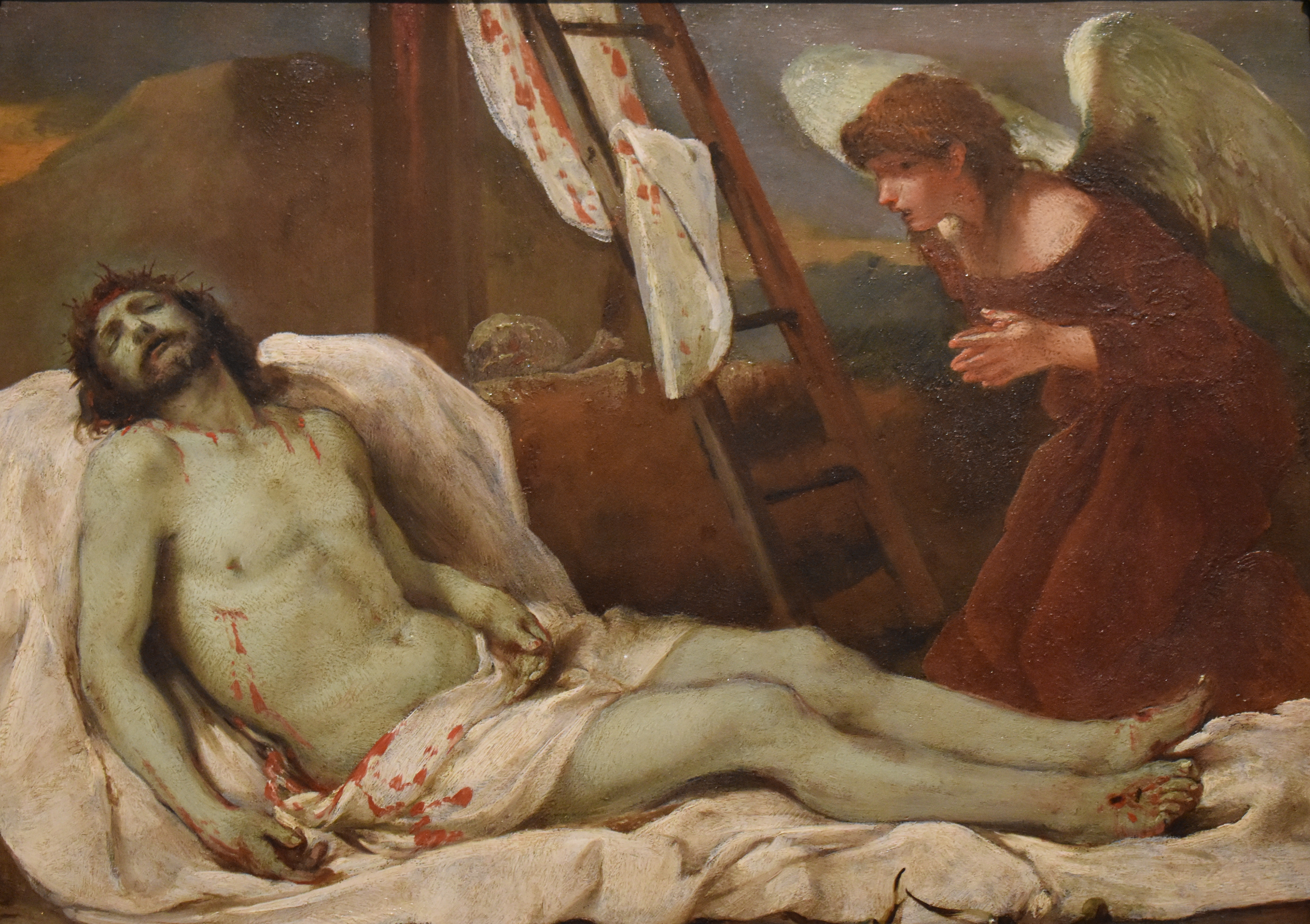
Angel Adoring the Dead Christ, Musée Granet, Aix-en-Provence

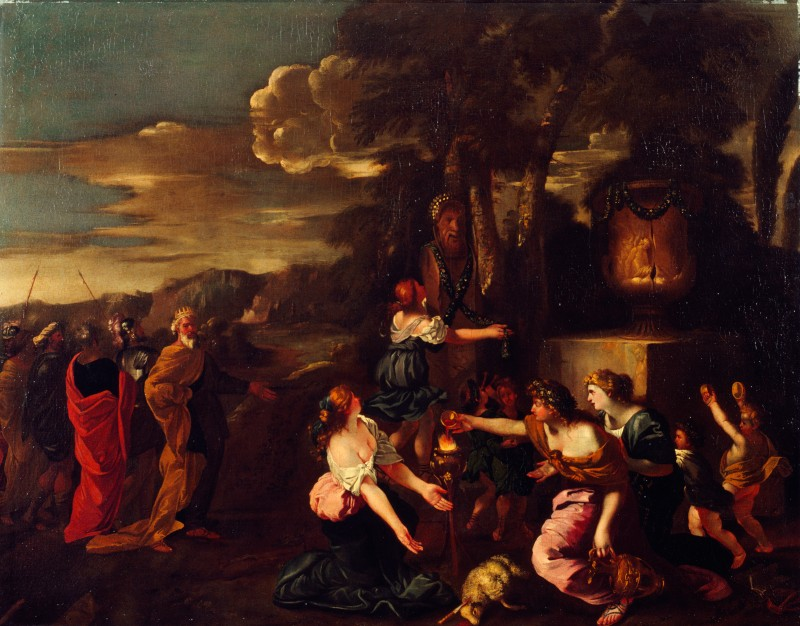
Solomon Worshipping Idols, Fondazione Cariplo

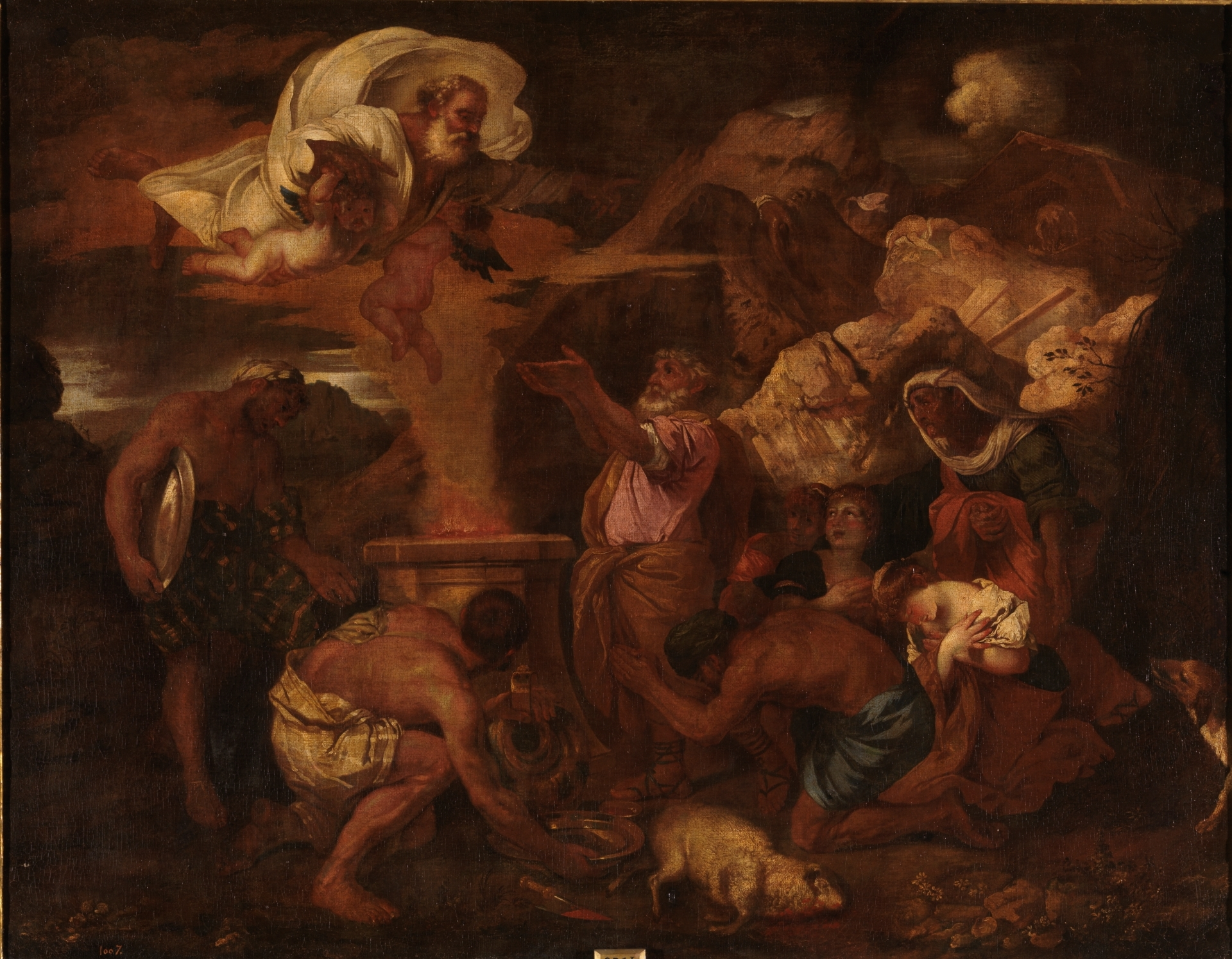
Noah after the Flood, Museo del Prado, Madrid

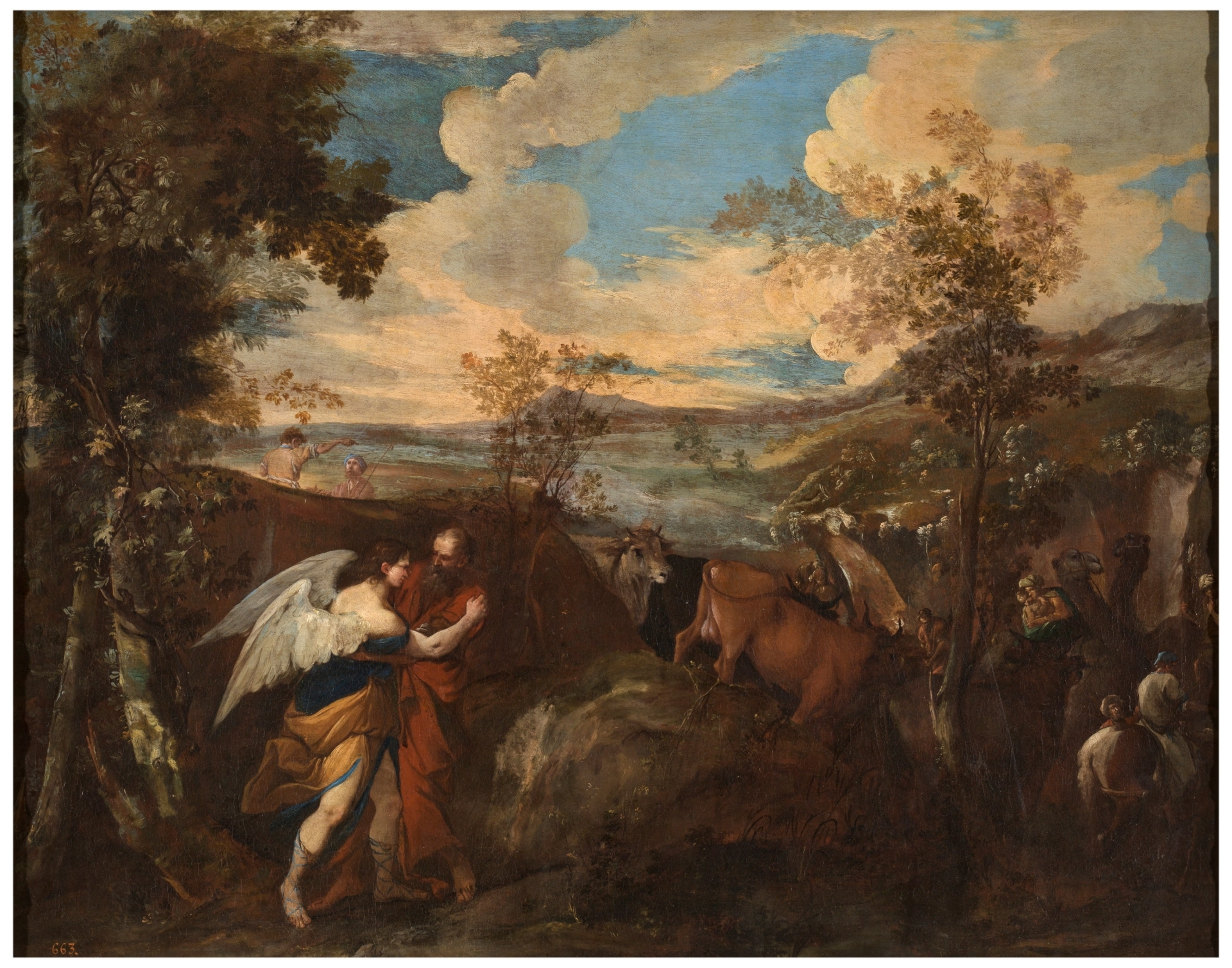
Jacob wrestling with the angel, Museo del Prado, Madrid

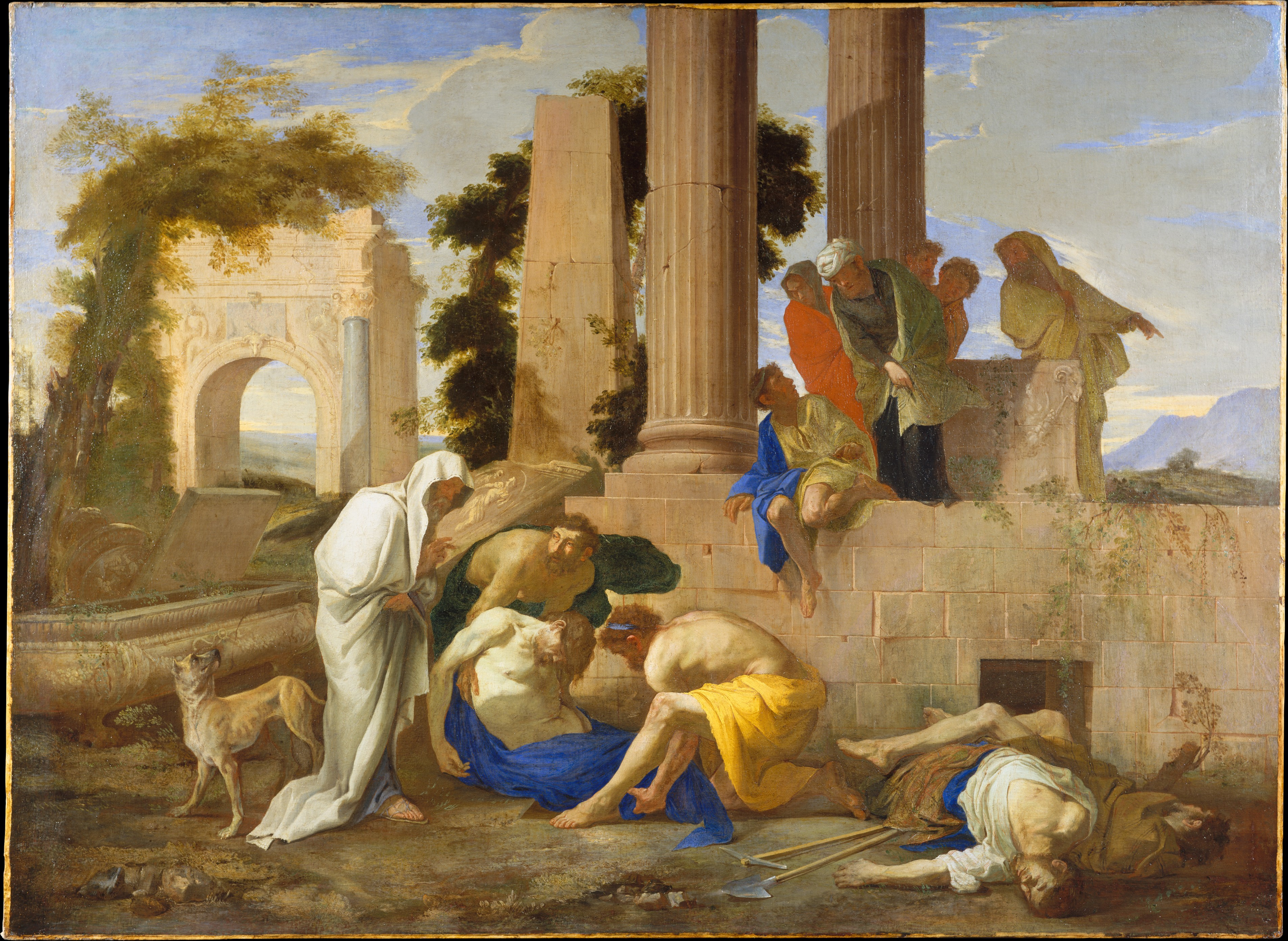
Tobit Burying the Dead, Metropolitan Museum of Art, New York

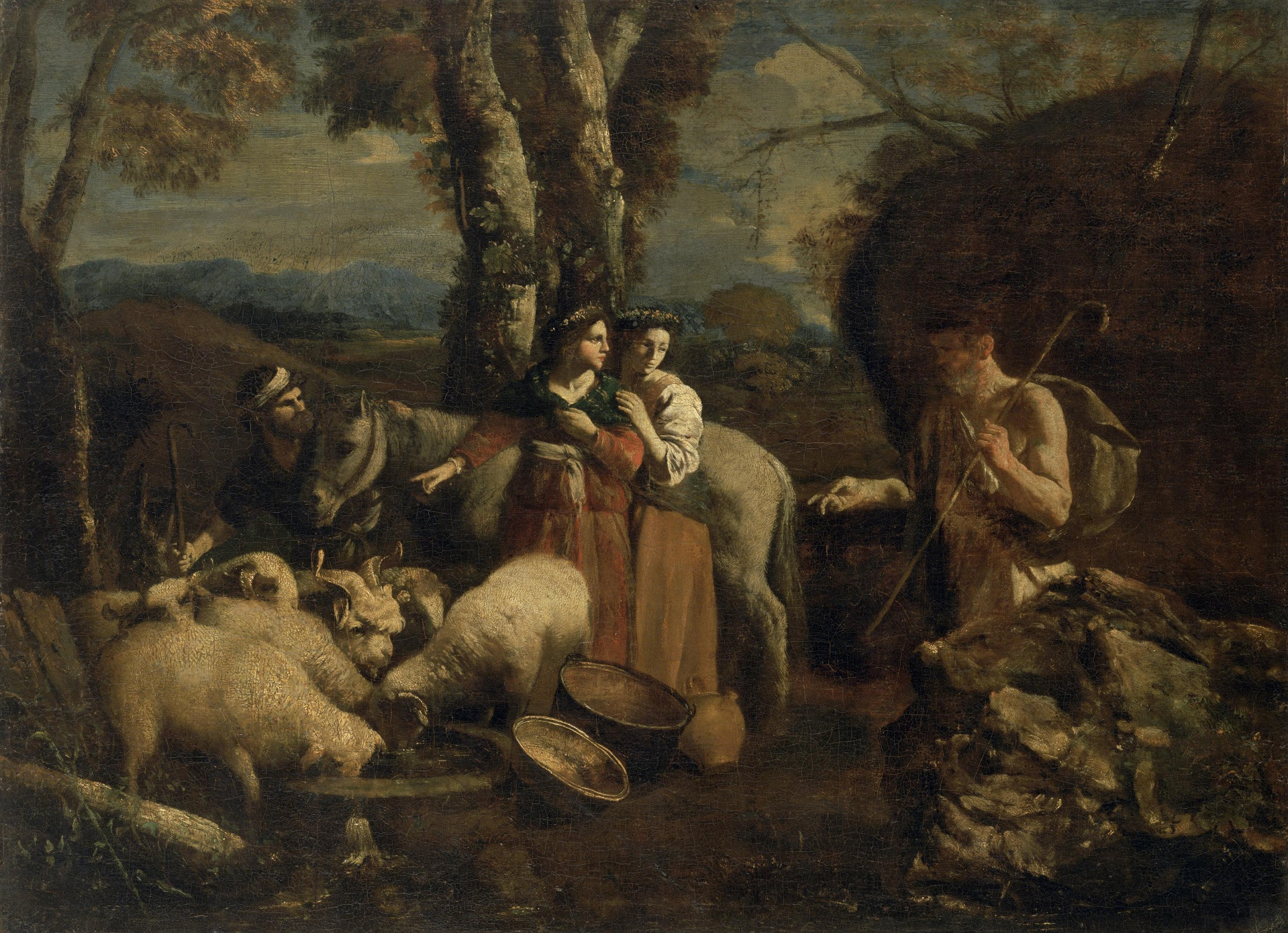
Jacob Meeting Rachel, Hermitage Museum, Saint Petersburg

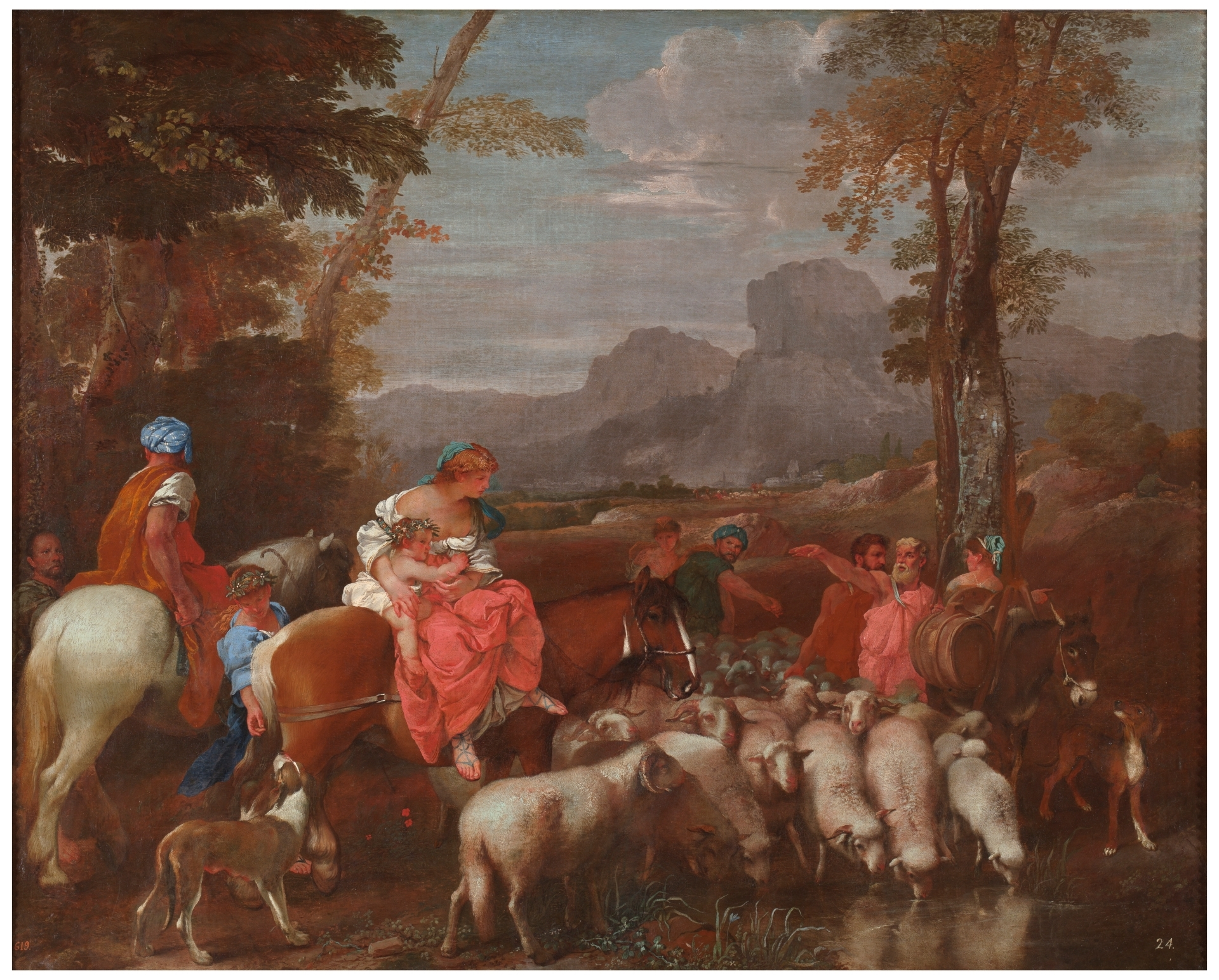
The Voyage of Jacob, Kunsthistorisches Museum, Vienna

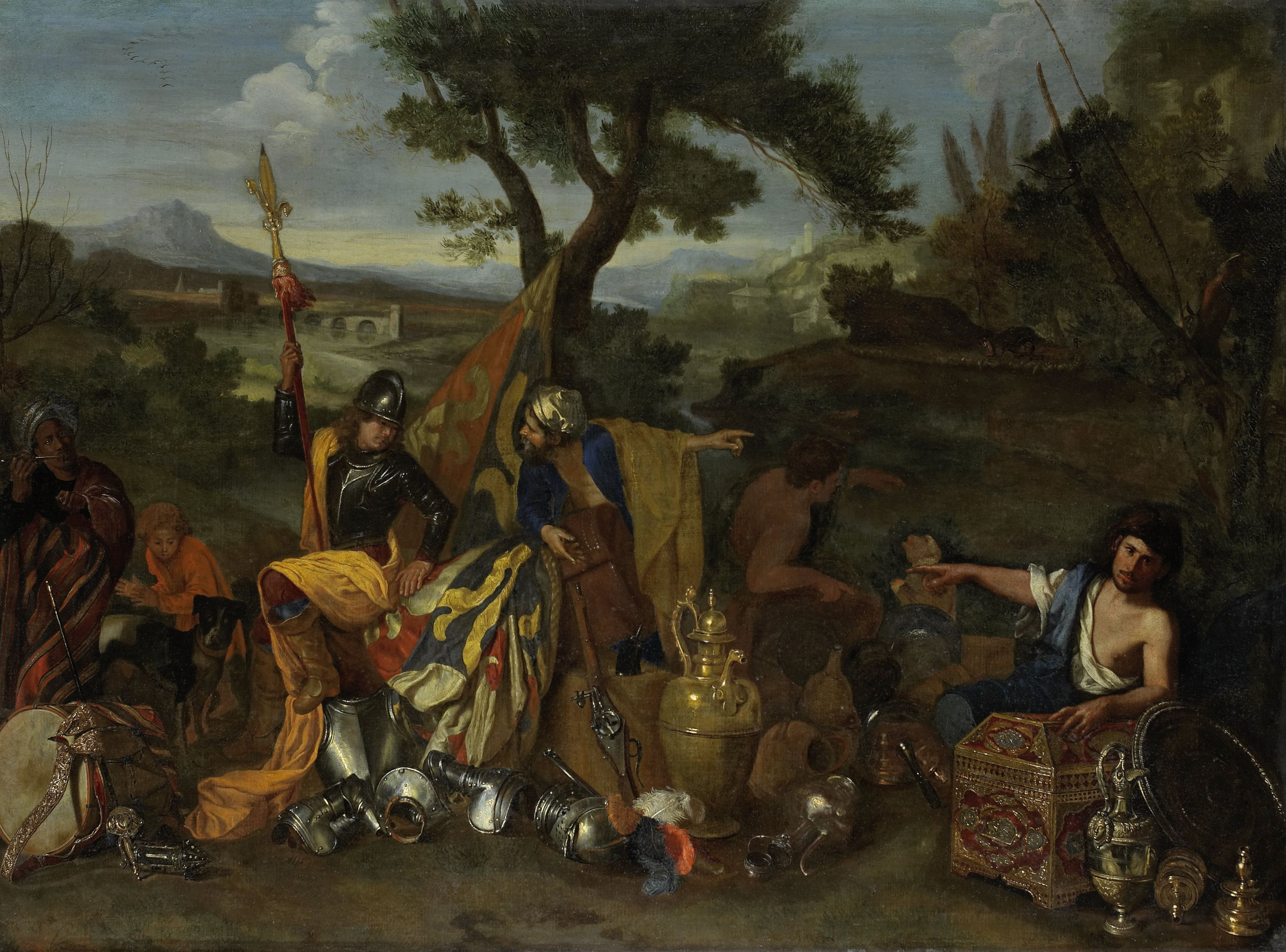
The peddlers, Rijksmuseum, Amsterdam
