= Belisario Corenzio =

Greek-Italian painter (1558–1646)

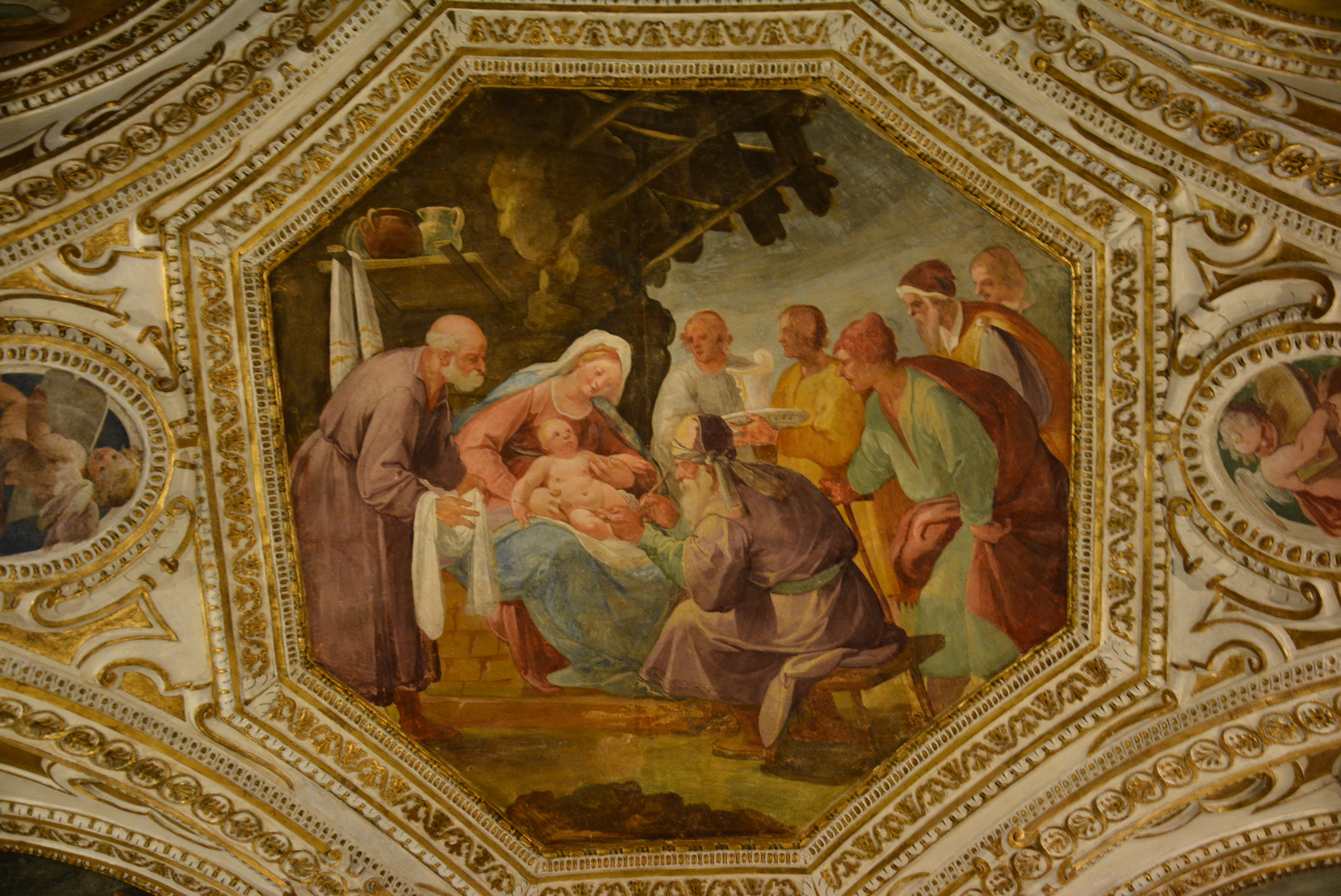
- The Virgin and Child
- Born: 1558; Kyparissia, Greece
- Died: 1646 (aged 87–88); Esperia, Italy
- Resting place: Tomb at Santi Severino e Sossio
- Education: Apprentice to Tintoretto
- Notable work: Frescos Crypt of Matthew
- Style: Mannerism
- Movement: Italian Renaissance; Italian Baroque

Belisario Corenzio (Greek: Βελισσάριος Κορένσιος 1558–1646) was a Greek-Italian painter, active in Venice and Naples. He is one of few Greek painters that did not belong to the Cretan Renaissance like his contemporaries of the time. He escaped the maniera greca completely. He adopted the Venetian style. Other similar Greek painters were Marco Basaiti, Ioannis Permeniates, Antonio Vassilacchi and El Greco. He was sometimes referred to as Il Greco. His teacher was prominent Venetian painter Tintoretto. In 1590, at age 32 Corenzio settled in Naples. Corenzio was influenced by Cavalier d'Arpino. He continued to flourish in the region. His apprentices included: Luigi Rodriguez, Andrea di Leone, Onofrio De Lione and Massimo Stanzione. Corenzio painted many frescos that survived today. Some of his works are in the Church of San Severino and Certosa di San Martino. His style resembles Caravaggio. An Italian legend in Naples exists involving Corenzio, Spanish painter Jusepe de Ribera, and Battistello Caracciolo. They were referred to as the Cabal of Naples. The three painters were rumored to have poisoned their competition for painting contracts. The rumors lack documented evidence. The three painters were very popular in Naples. Corenzio frescoed the Crypt that holds the remains of Matthew the Apostle at Salerno Cathedral and it depicts scenes from the Gospel of Matthew. Corenzio was one of the most celebrated fresco painters in Naples during his time. His drawings can be found all over the world namely at the Metropolitan Museum, Museo di Capodimonte and Louvre. More recently, his life and work was studied by the Greek art historian Panayotis K. Ioannou in a comprehensive monograph (Belisario Corenzio: La Vita e le Opere).

== Biography ==
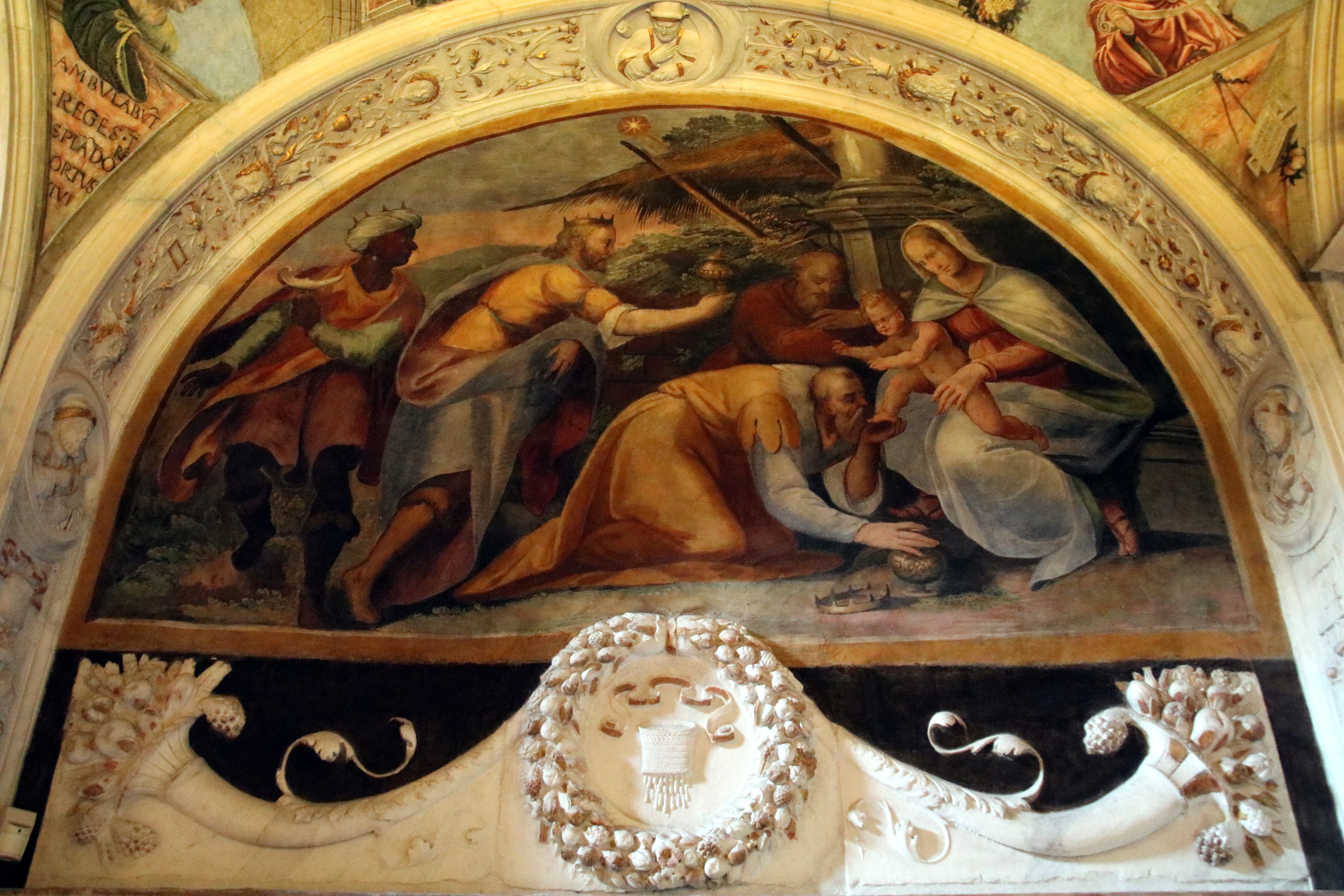
The Three Magi

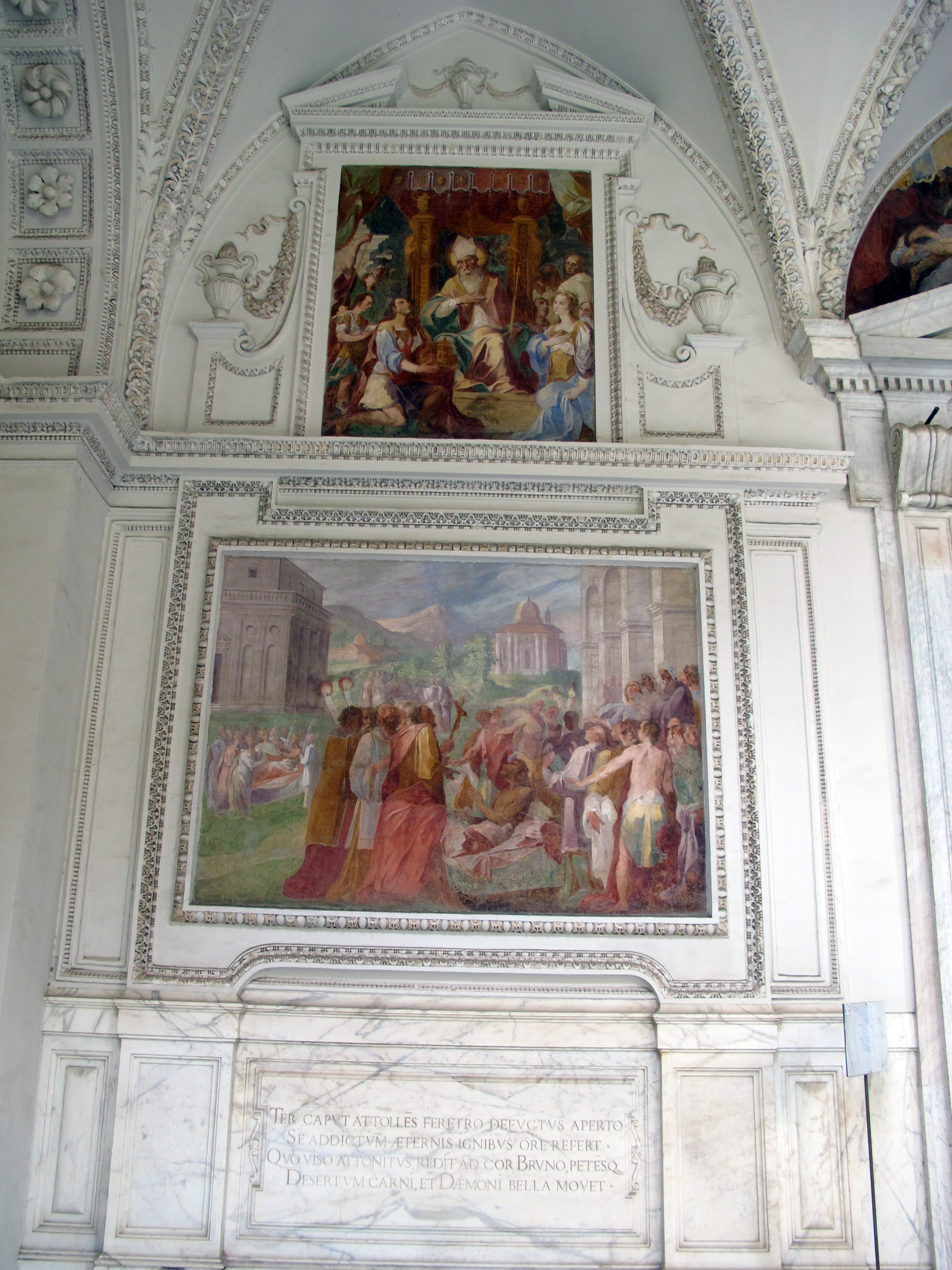
Frescoes

Corenzio was born in Kyparissia in the Peloponnese. He was in the Kingdom of Naples by age 12. The region was part of the Spanish Empire. His family was part of the Greek community in Naples. His father's name was Ioannis. His father and Uncle Nikolaos were prominent members of the Spanish community. The family had a close relationship with Don Juan de Austria. Nikolaos served in the Royal Navy. He was a professional seaman. The family was very wealthy. According to the testimony of collector Padre Resta, Corenzio was sent to learn painting by the Don himself. A contract exists from 1574 regarding Corenzio's painting education but it was only for six months.

He migrated to Venice during the 1580s. He spent five years in Venice studying under Tintoretto. There was a prominent Greek community in Venice around that period. San Giorgio dei Greci employed many of the Greek painters. Some of the Greek painters living in Venice were Antonio Vassilacchi, Thomas Bathas and Emmanuel Tzanfournaris. By 1590, Corenzio returned to Naples and settled there for the rest of his life. He had an active workshop. Art historian Bernardo de' Dominici extensively wrote about the painters of Napoli in his famous Vite dei Pittori, Scultori, ed Architetti Napolitani in the later part of the 18th century. It is one of the first extensive biographies written about Corenzio. It was published in 1742. Bernardo de' Dominici was considered the Neapolitan Vasari.

Dominici described Corenzio as a brilliant painter who was exceptionally talented. He could paint faster than five painters combined. According to Dominici, Corenzio painted for money rather than art. He complained that Corenzio's artwork suffered when he was paid less. Dominici had a similar opinion regarding other prominent Italian painters. Paolo de Matteis began collecting notes on Neopolitan artists. He died before he could publish his work. Dominici used these notes in his writings about Corenzio.

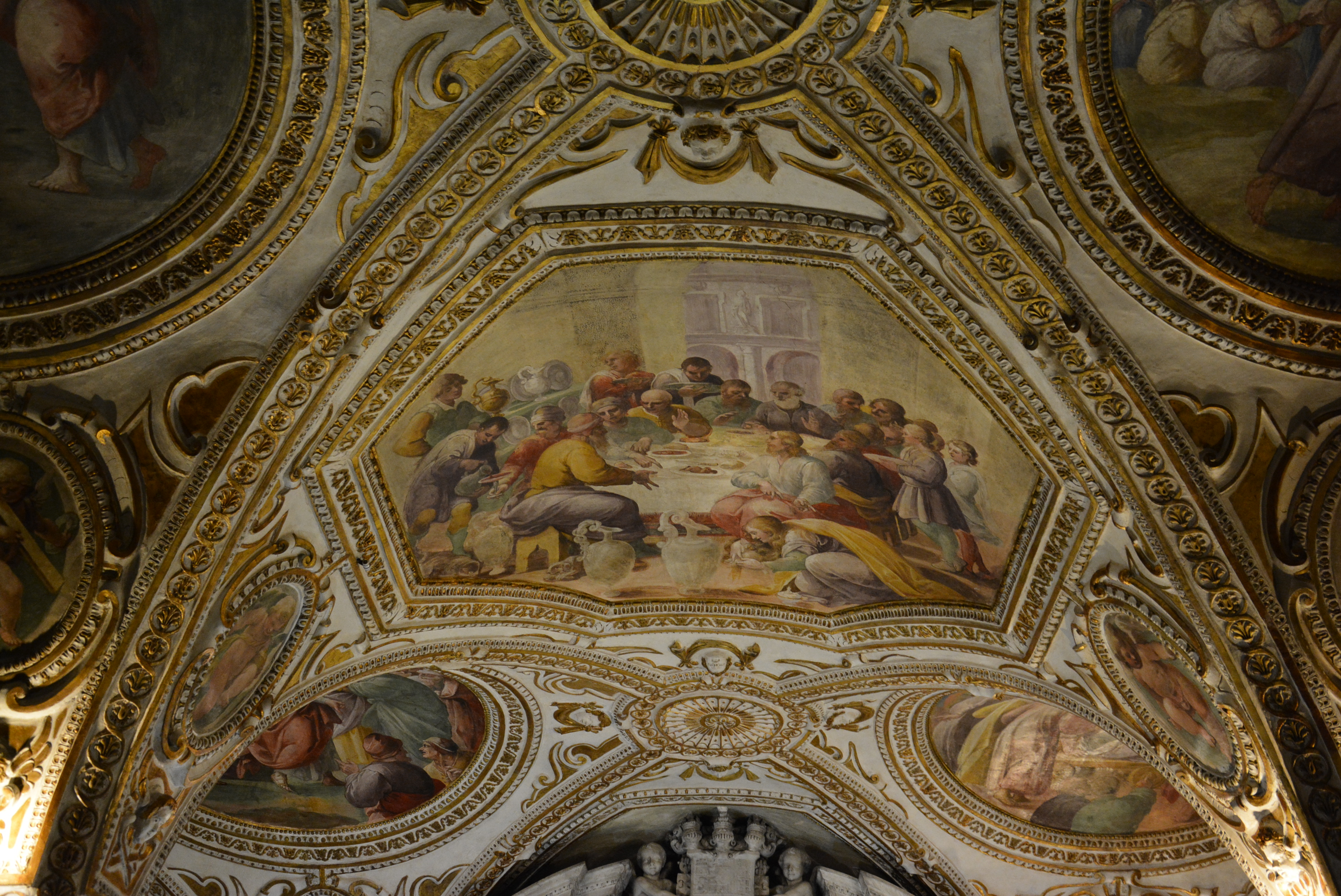
Crypt of Salerno Cathedral

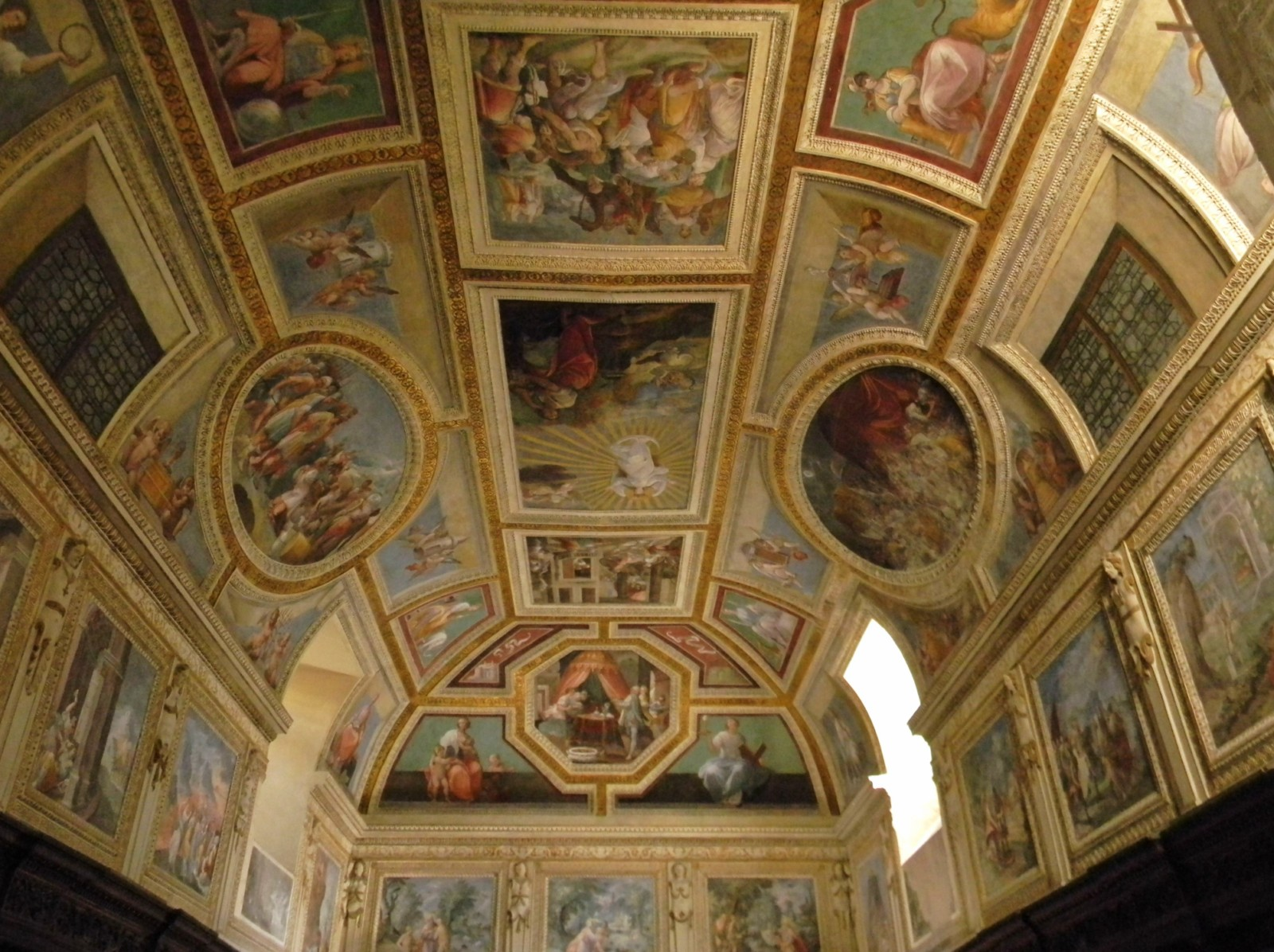
Ceiling frescoes in the Basilica della SS Annunziata Maggiore, Naples

According to Dominici, Corenzio was also very jealous and despotic towards other painters. Because of his ill-temper and bad reputation his artistic reputation was overshadowed by negative rumors. Corenzio formed an alliance with Jusepe de Ribera and Battistello Caracciolo. The group was called the Cabal of Naples. For four hundred years historians have added their own versions of the story but none of the claims are grounded on solid evidence. According to legend, the three painters did not allow the employment of foreign painters in Naples. Luigi Rodriguez was a student of Corenzio. It is rumored that his student was so good that he began to obtain his own contracts. Corenzio became very jealous and he slowly poisoned him. Some historians disagree on the date of Luigi Rodriguez‘s death.

Guido Reni was afraid to paint in Naples around 1621 because of rumors that the Cabal of Naples poisoned artists that tried to compete with them. Another rumor surfaced that Guido Reni's assistant was murdered by the Cabal of Naples and Guido Reni was driven out of the city. Another claim that involved Corenzio and the Cabal of Naples was the poisoning of famous painter Domenichino, but Dominici specifies that his relatives played a major part in his death because they wanted his money.

Corenzio continued to paint all over Naples. He mainly completed many frescos in different churches in Naples. Three notable churches include Salerno Cathedral, Santi Severino e Sossio, and Santissima Annunziata Maggiore, Naples. He taught fresco painting in Naples some of his students also included painters Onofrio De Lione, Massimo Stanzione and Andrea di Leone. Many of Corenzio's drawings survived until today. More rumors surfaced about his death. One such story states that he fell from a scaffolding while repairing one of his frescos in the church of San Severino another rumor states he poisoned himself. He is one of the most gossiped and celebrated artists of his time. His tomb can be found at Santi Severino e Sossio.

== Artistic career ==
His earliest work was during the 1590s he painted the Medici Chapel of Gragnano which is part of the Santi Severino e Sossio and Certosa di San Martino. Around 1603, the painter painted the basilica of Santa Maria a Parete in Liveri Naples. He painted two frescos. The larger one is on the right side depicting scenes of the Dance of Death, Judgment, Hell, and Heaven. Other paintings are in Nola at the Church of the Annunciation. There is evidence that Corenzio painted parts of the Castel Capuano from dated payments of the Banco di Napoli in 1608. Corenzio also painted frescoes in the church of Santa Patrizia.

In 1609, he decorated the vaults of the nave, transept, and choir of church of Santi Severino e Sossio. By 1615, he frescoed the lunette vault of the apse of the church of Santa Maria di Costantinopoli. Around 1629, he frescoed the dome of Monte Cassino (lost in the bombing of 1944 ). He also painted frescoes in the gallery of Capuano Palace (Portici). They were also destroyed. He worked for many years in the church of Santa Maria la Nova (he frescoed the ceiling). He created four canvases for the Santa Maria Del Popolo (Christmas, Epiphany, Presentation and the Rest in Egypt). The painter retired in the village of Esperia, he died in 1646 at 88 years old. He completed countless works throughout his lifetime. Many artists were extremely jealous of his successful workshop.

He was a prominent member of the Greek community in Naples. A similar church existed resembling San Giorgio dei Greci in Venice. The church served the local Greek Orthodox population and it was called the Santi Pietro e Paolo dei Greci (Naples, Italy). Corenzio completed frescos in the church. He was also a member of the Confraternity of Saints Peter and Paul of the Greeks. A road in Vomero is named after him, it is called Via Belisario Corenzio.

== Gallery ==
=== Paintings ===
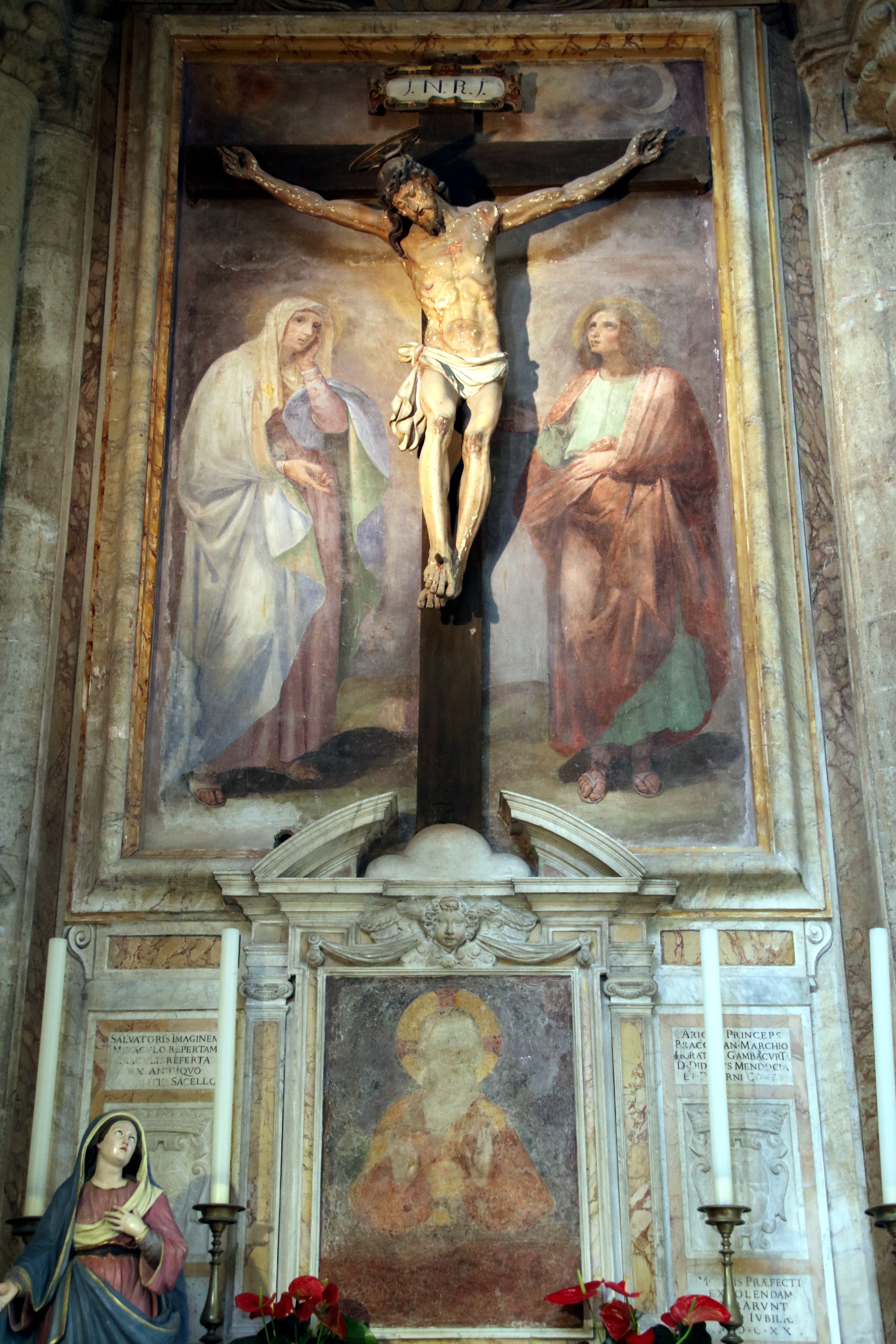
Crucifixion

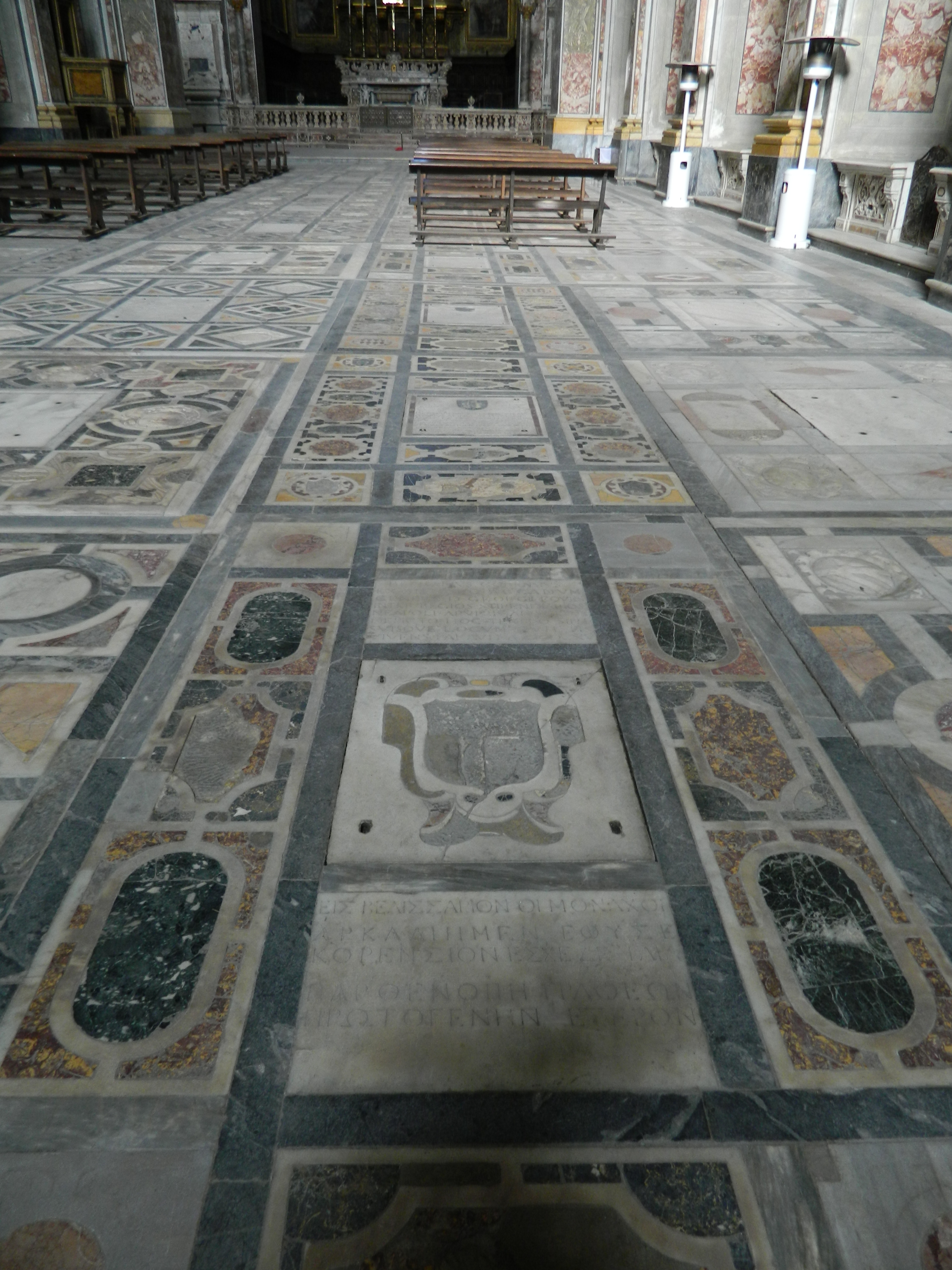
Floor (detail from the tomb of Belisario Corenzio) - Church of Saints Severino and Sossio of Naples

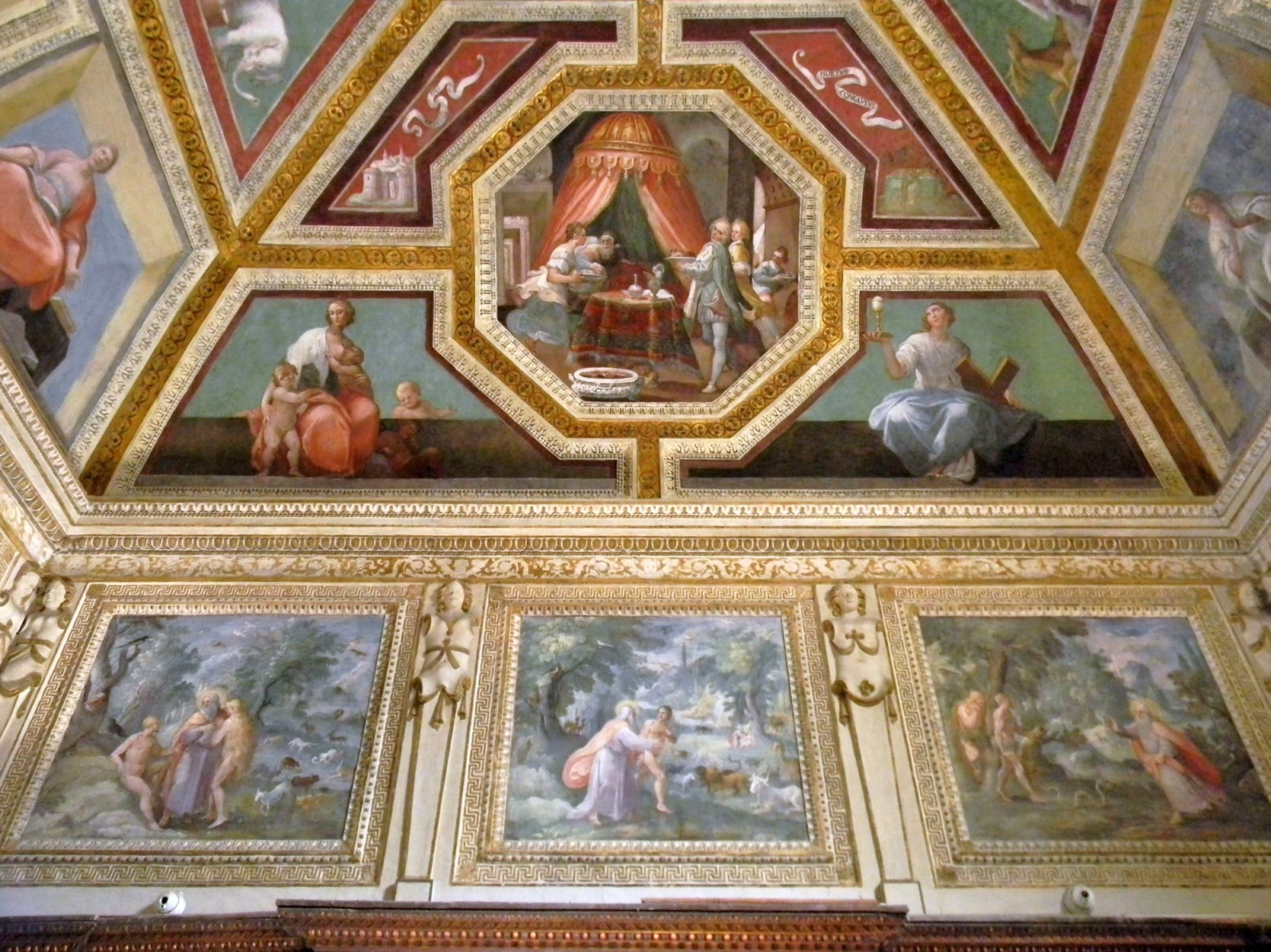
Santissima Annunziata Maggiore

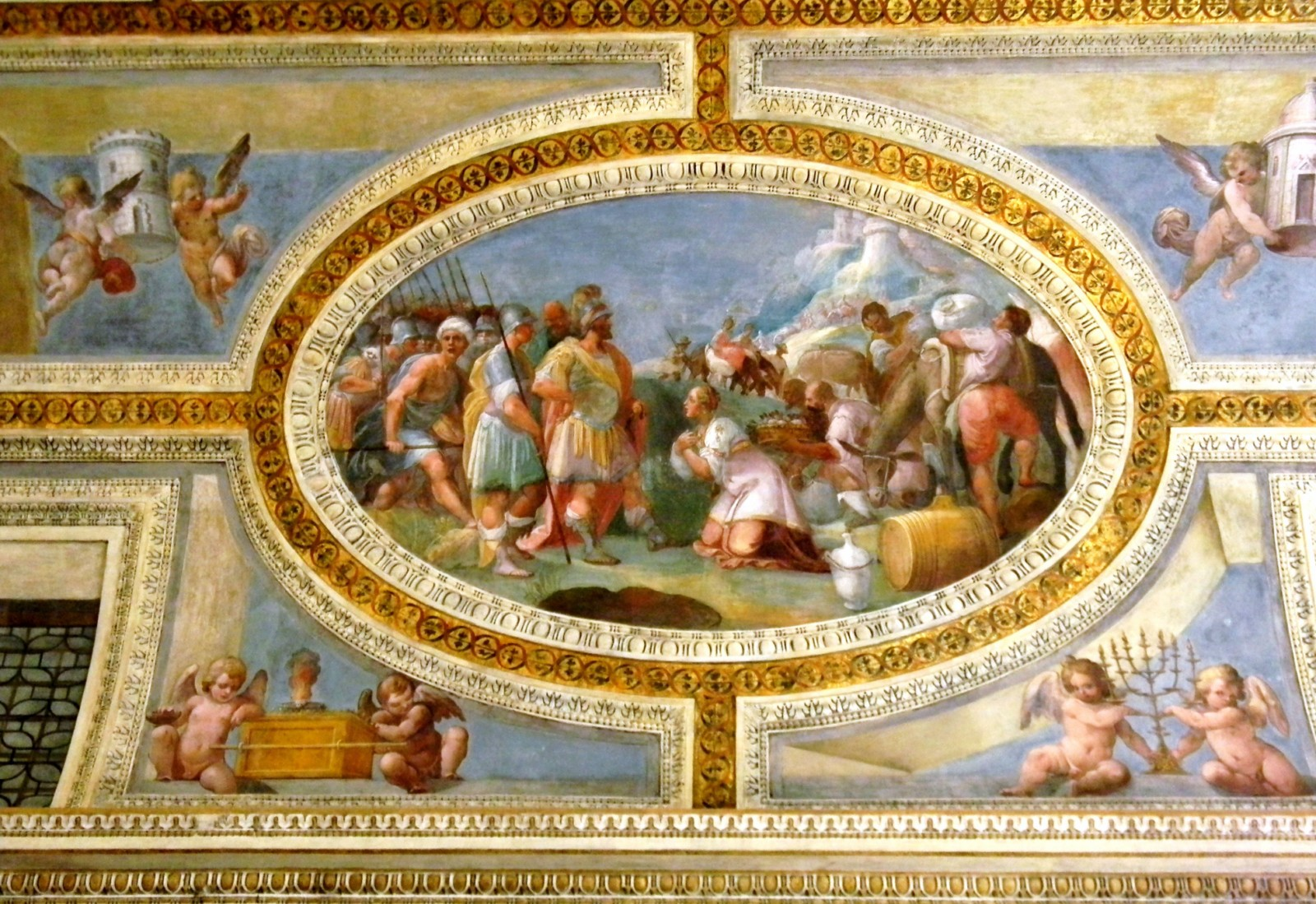
Frescoes, Scenes from the Old Testament

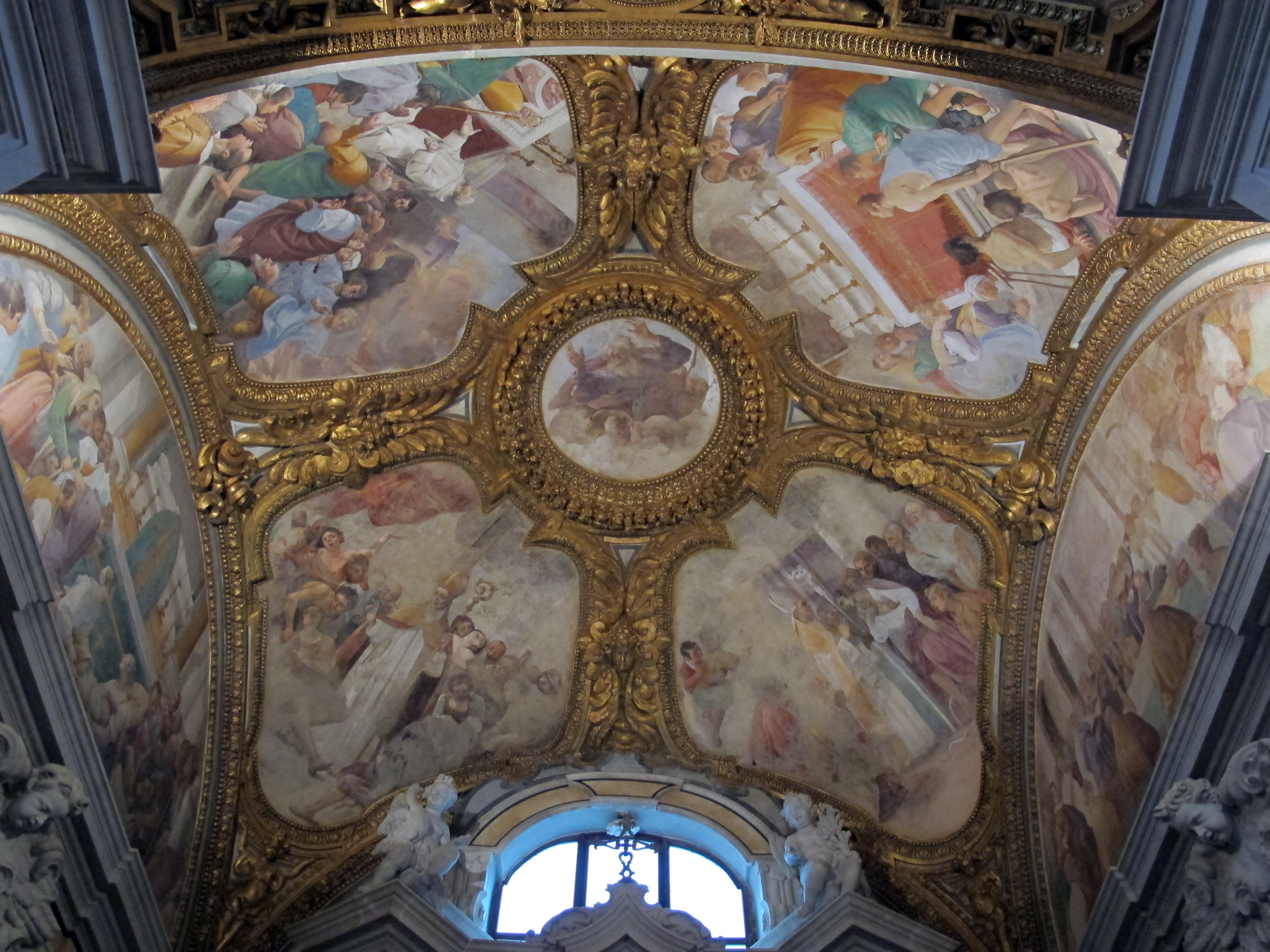
Frescoes, S. martino, church, chapel of sant'ugo, 1632

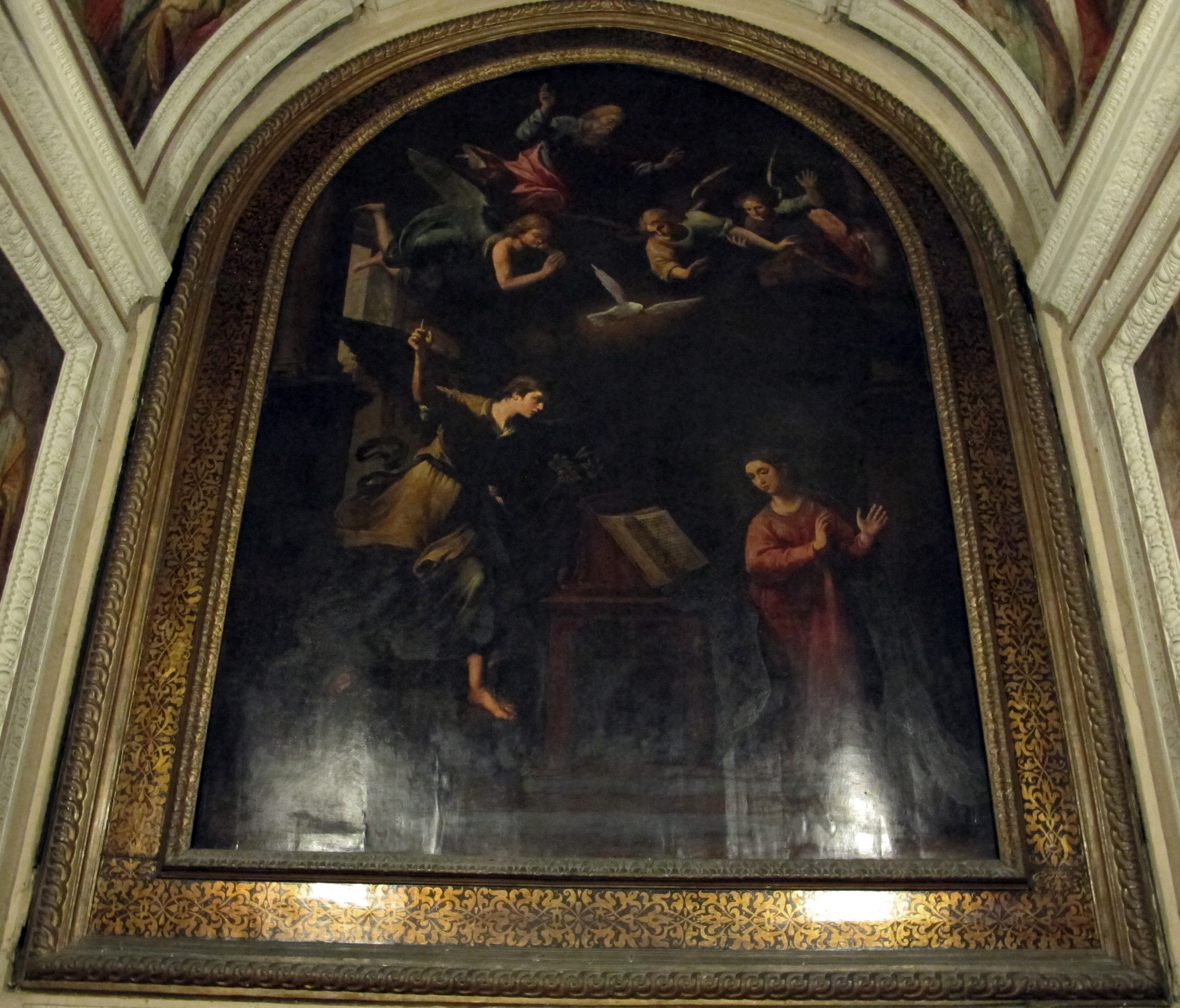
Church of Pietà dei Turchini (Naples), Annunciation

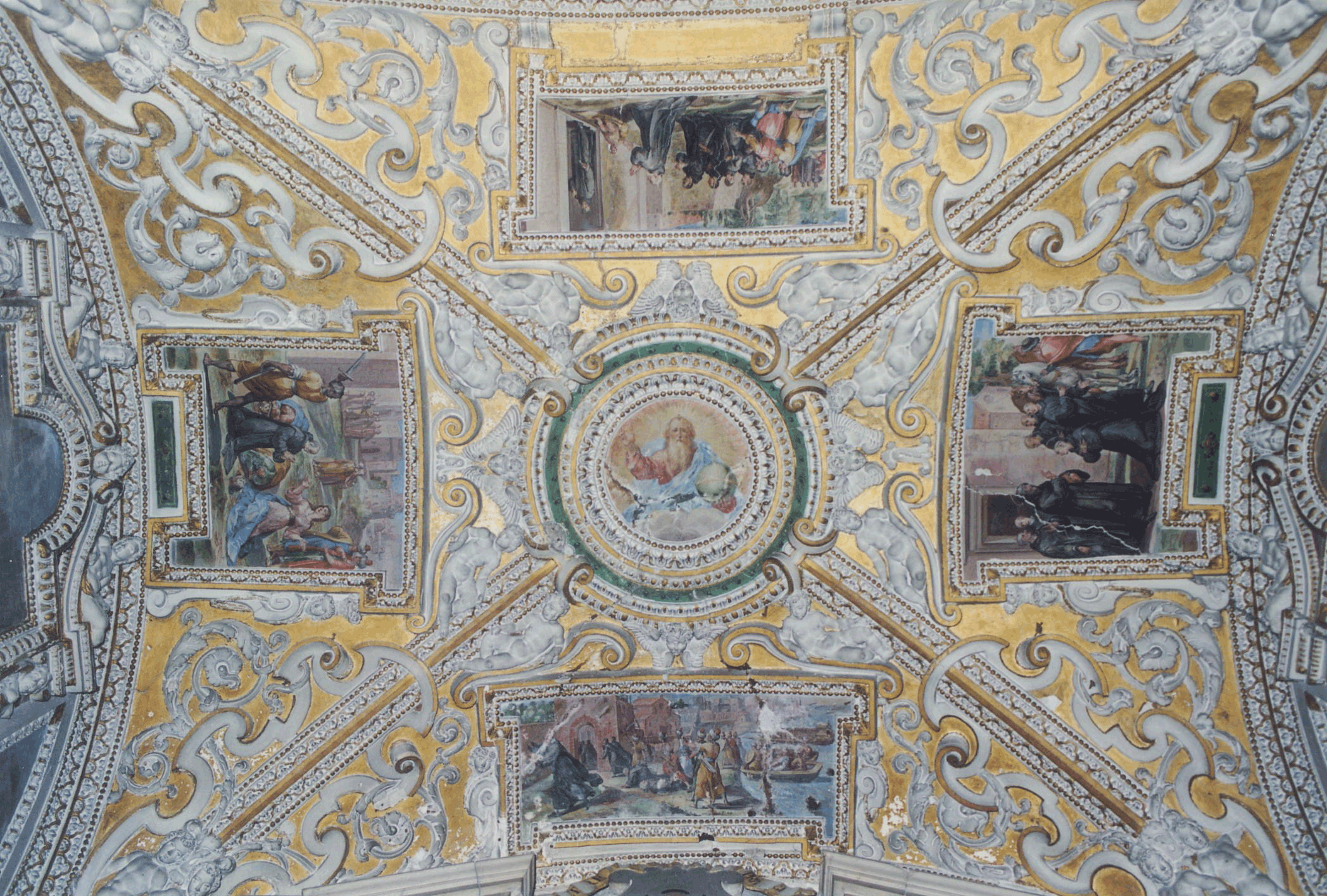
Church of Saints Severin and Sosios, painting of the Medici chapel, before 1593

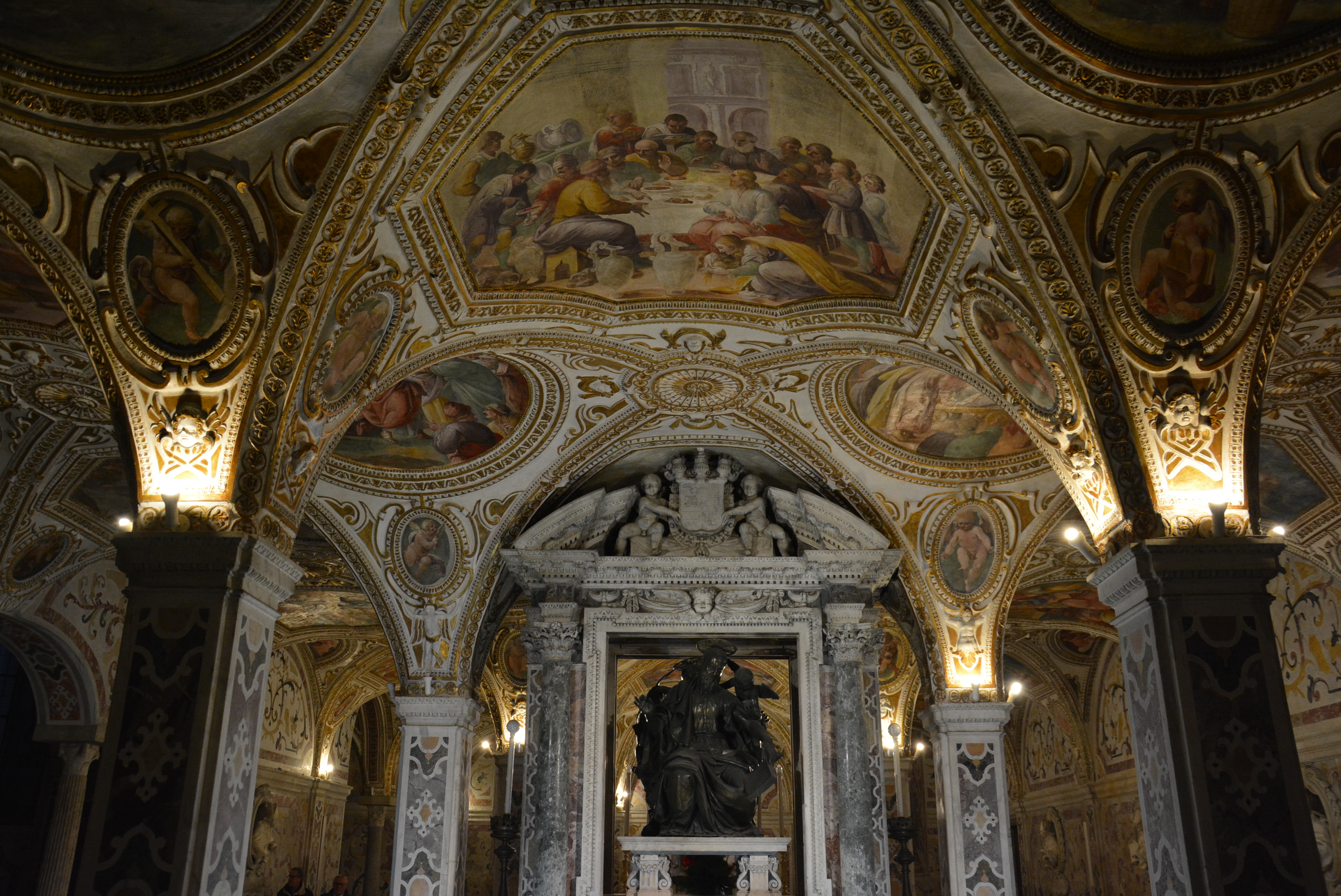
Cattedrale di Salerno

=== Drawings ===
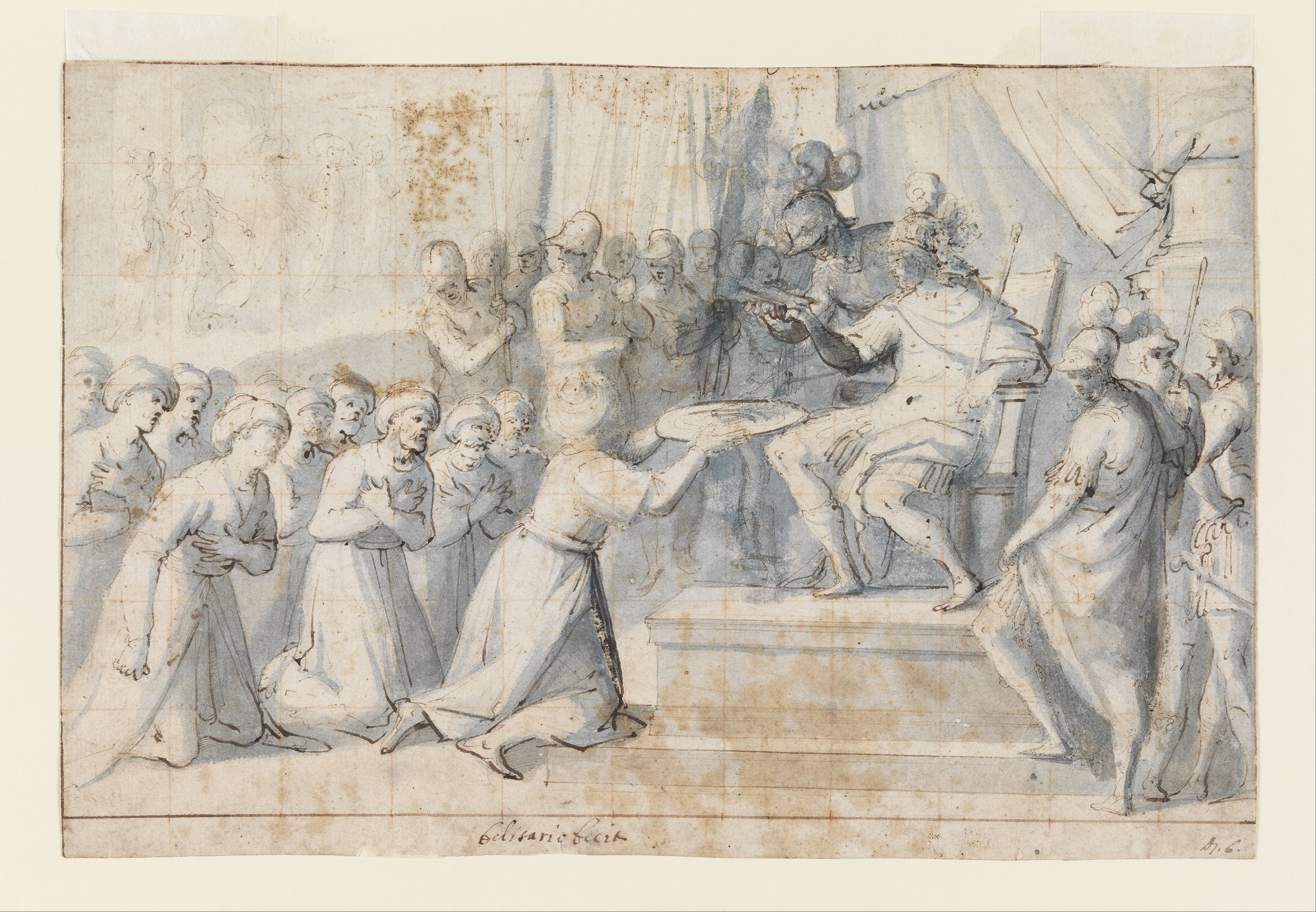
Turkish Ambassador presents gifts to Don Juan of Austria, circa 1630, drawing on paper

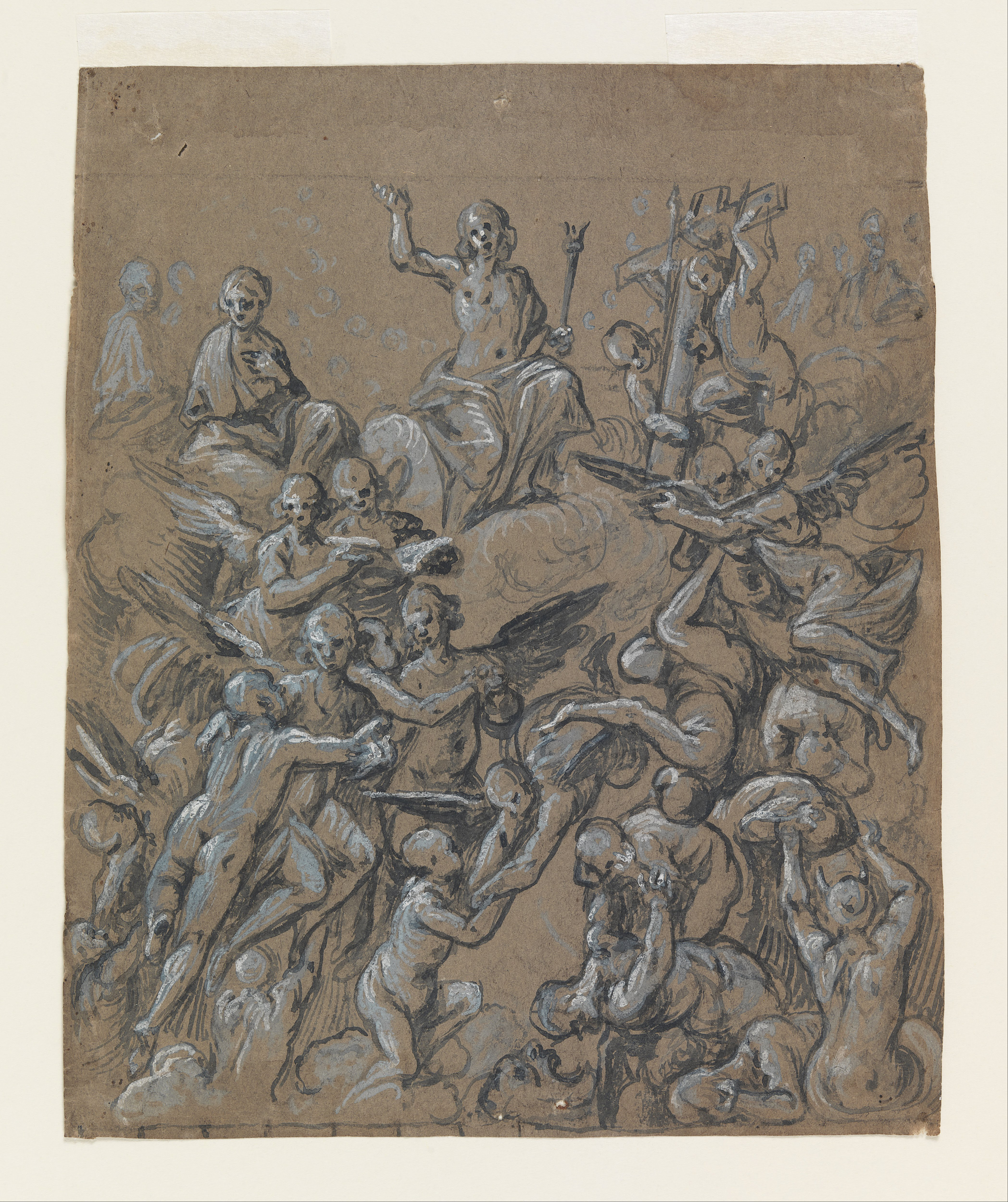
Christ in Glory with Angles

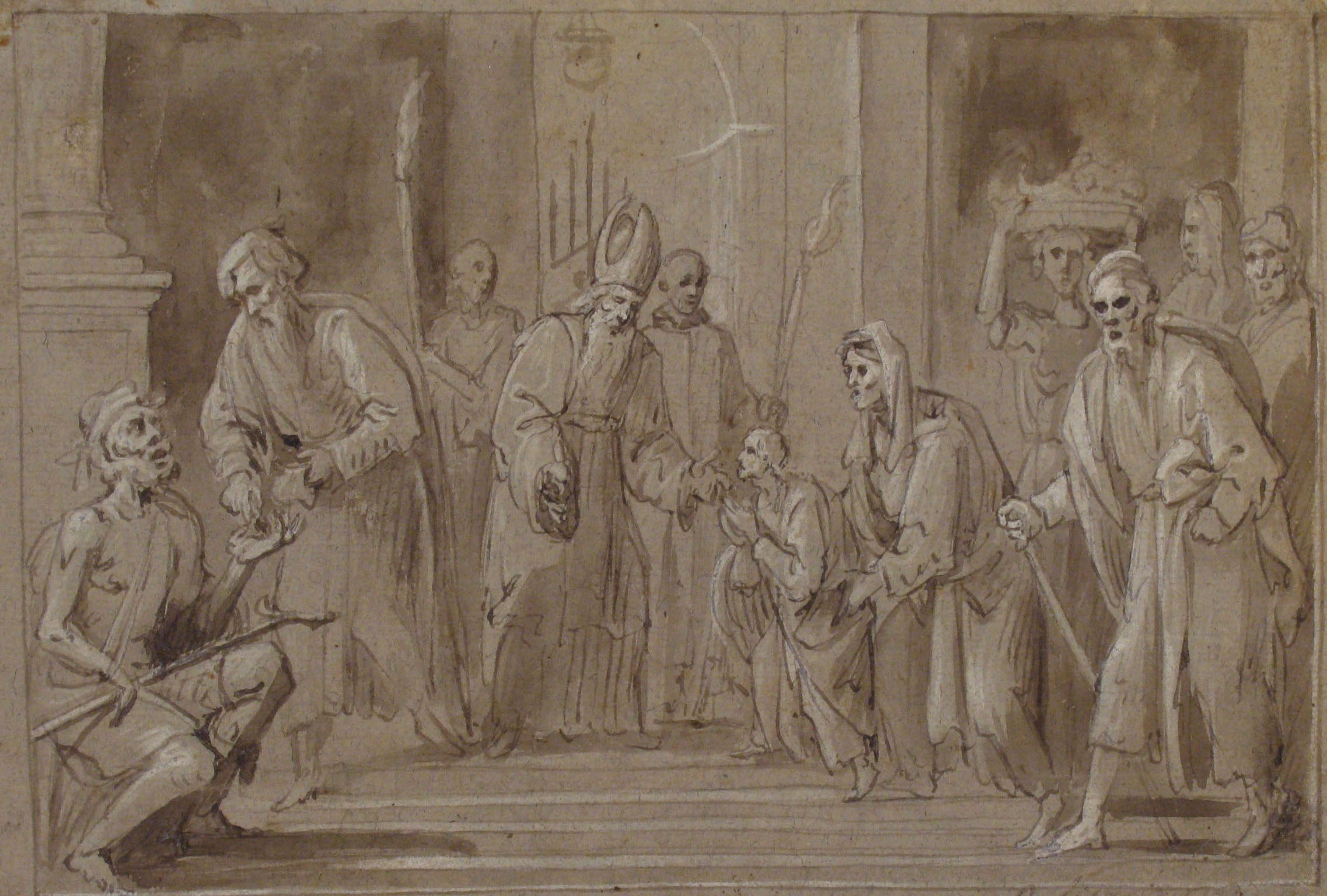
Presentation of the Virgin

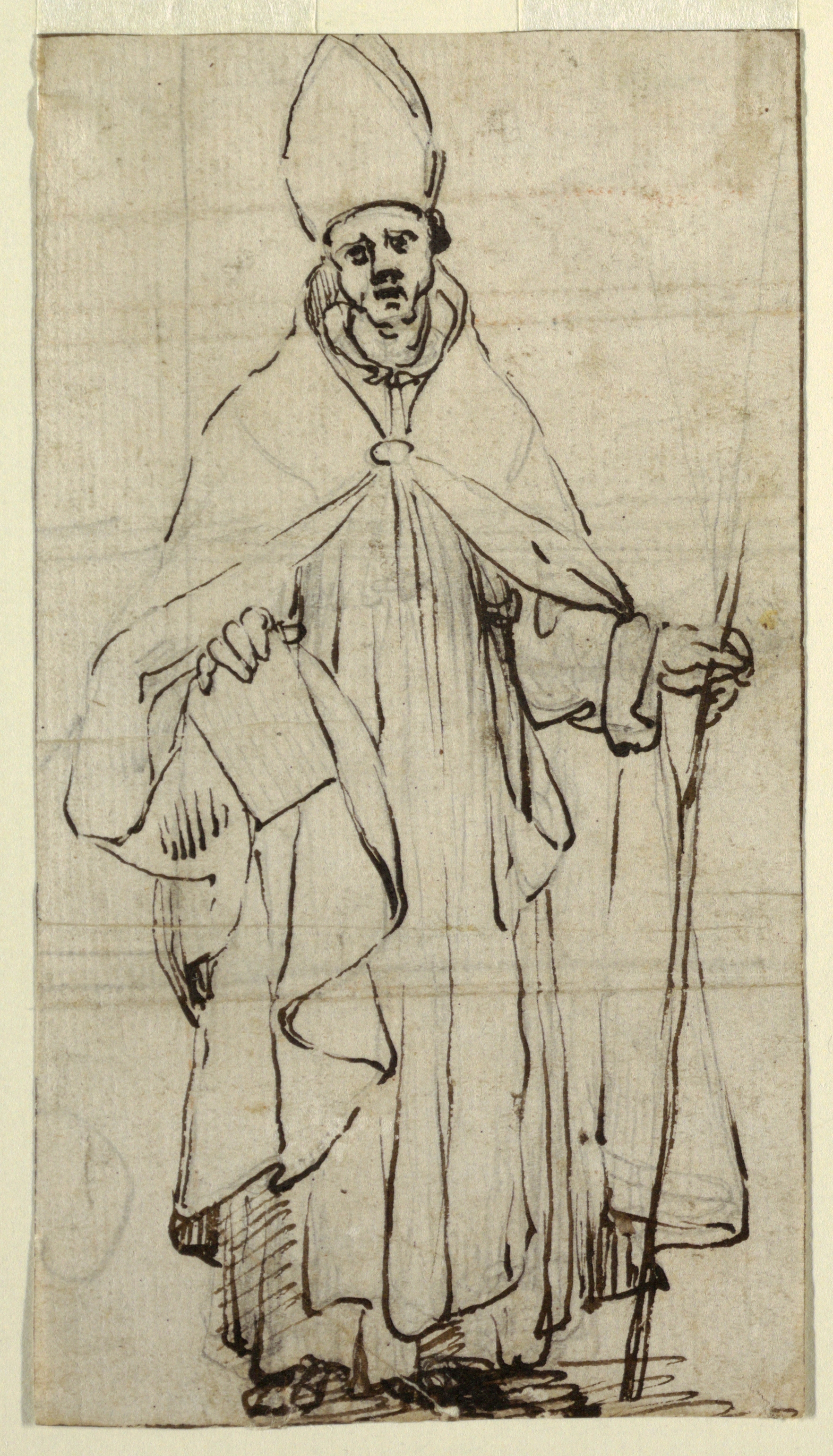
Standing Bishop

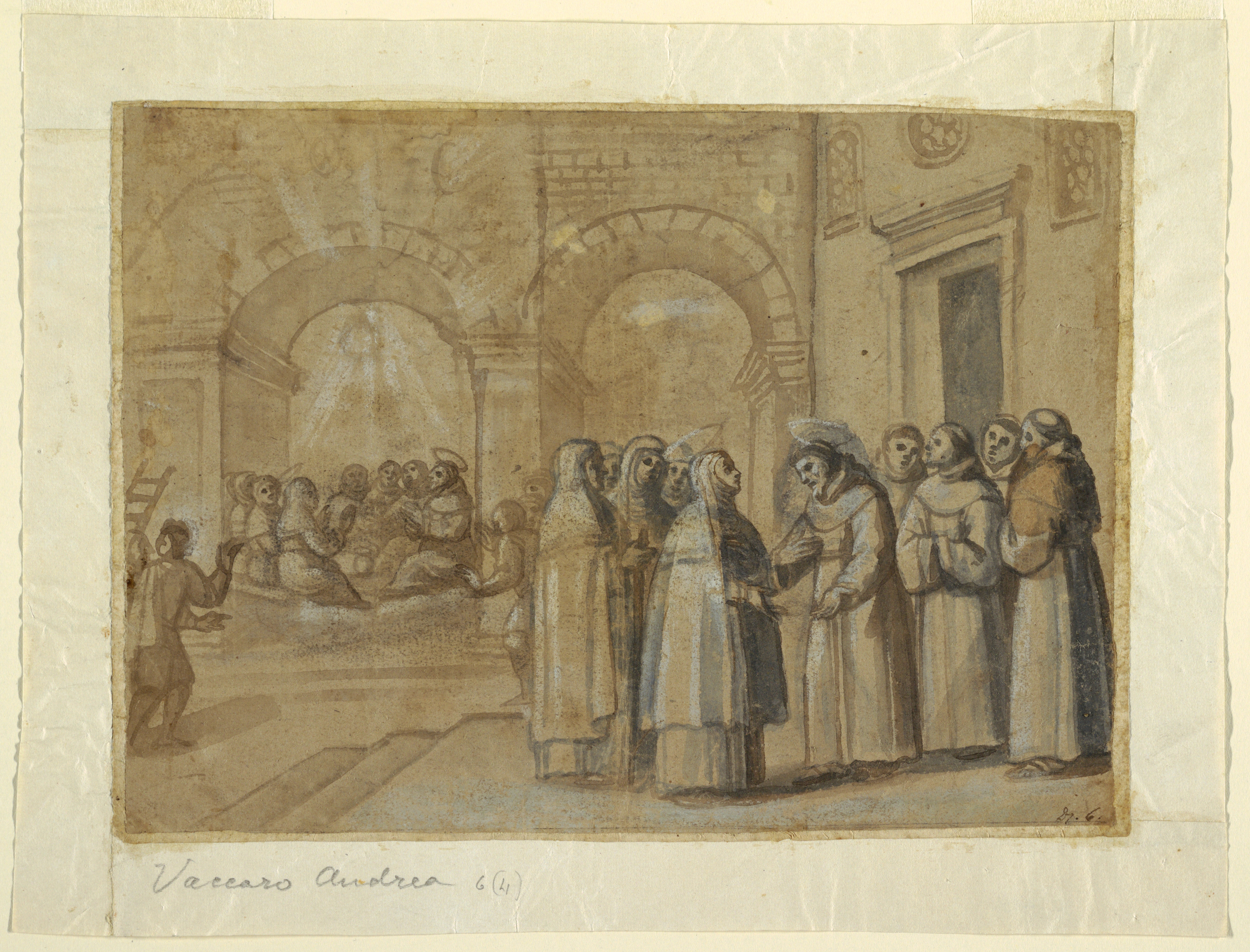
Meeting of Saints Francis and Clara

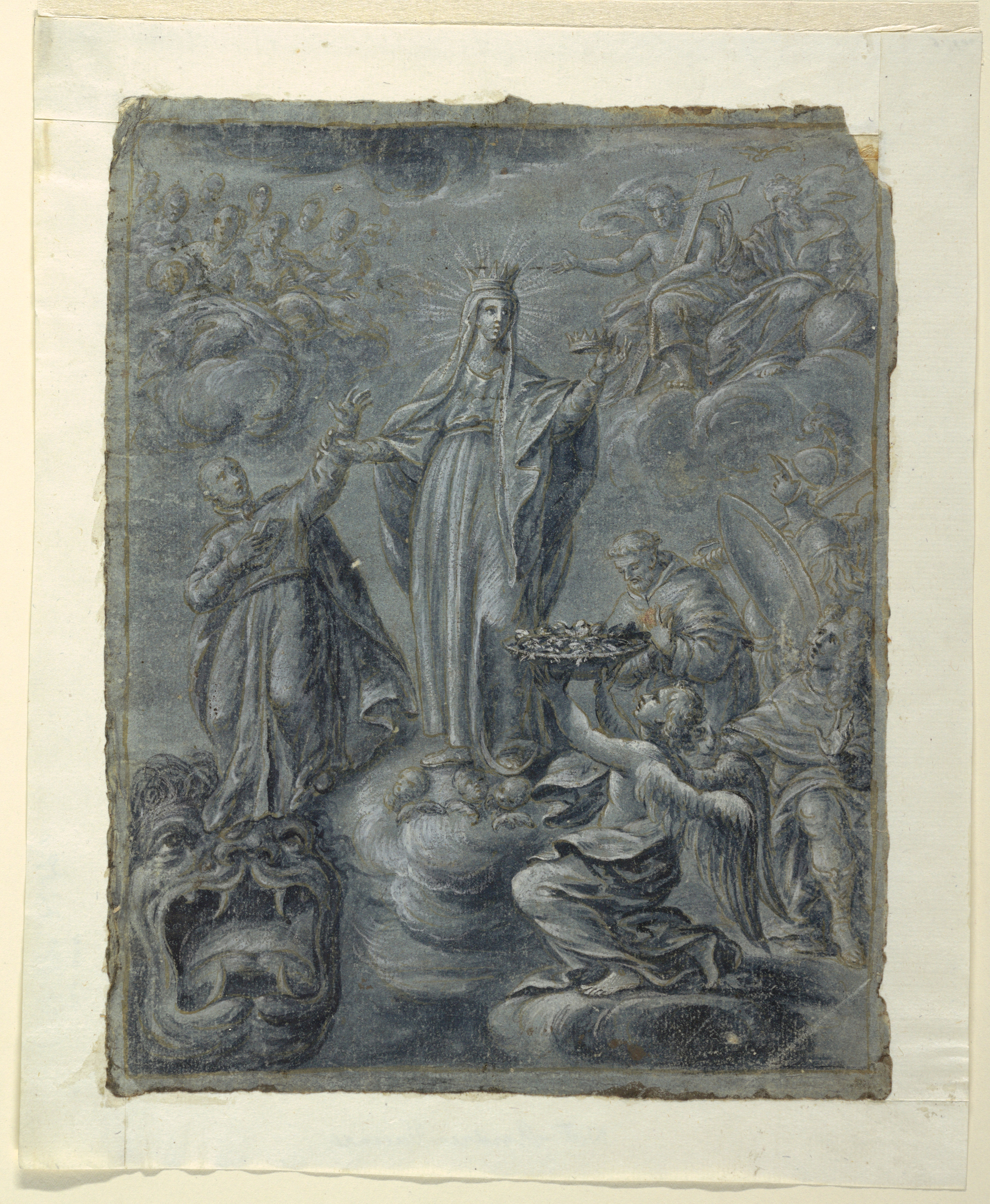
Coronation of the Virgin

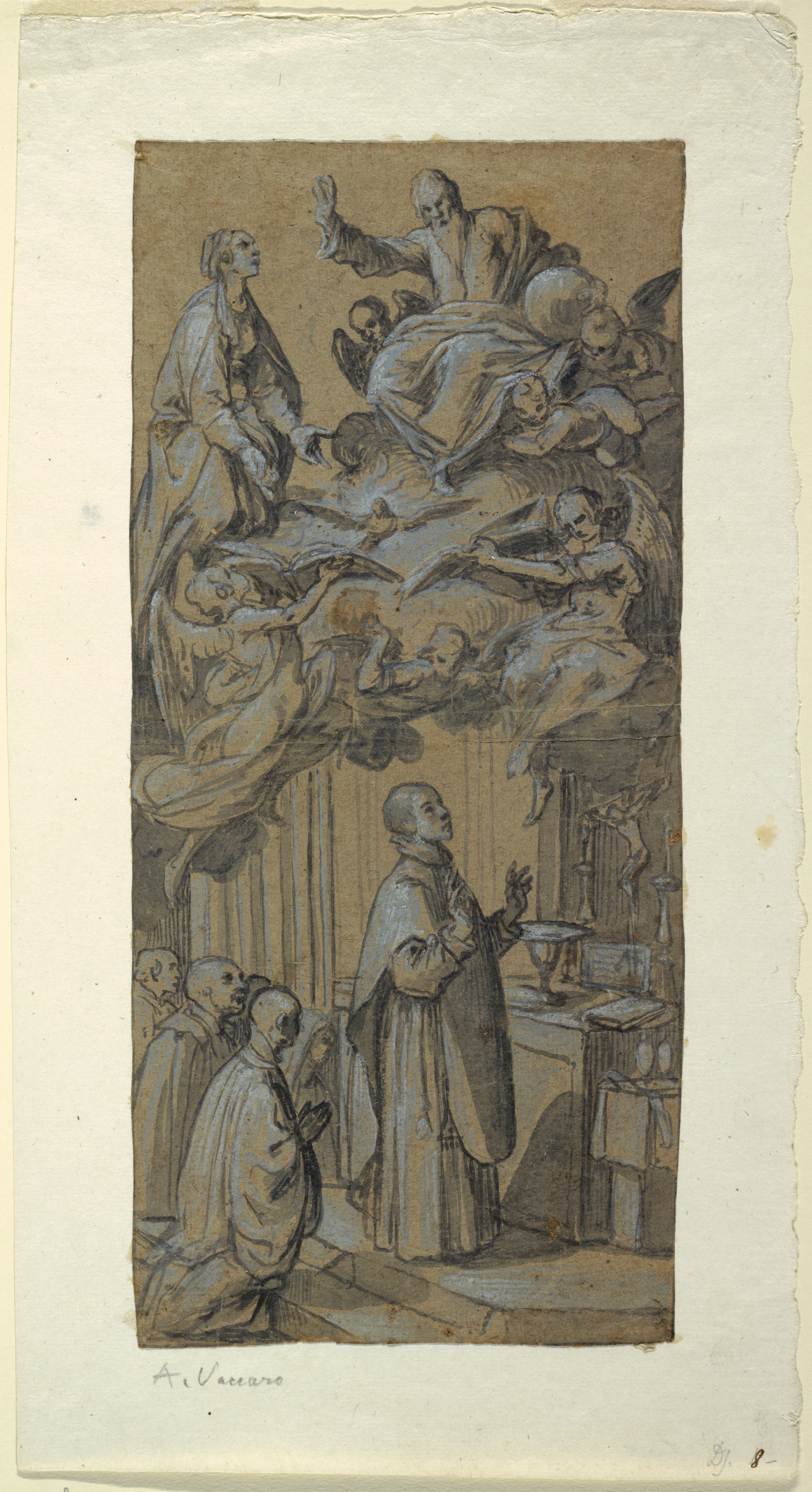
Vision During a Mass

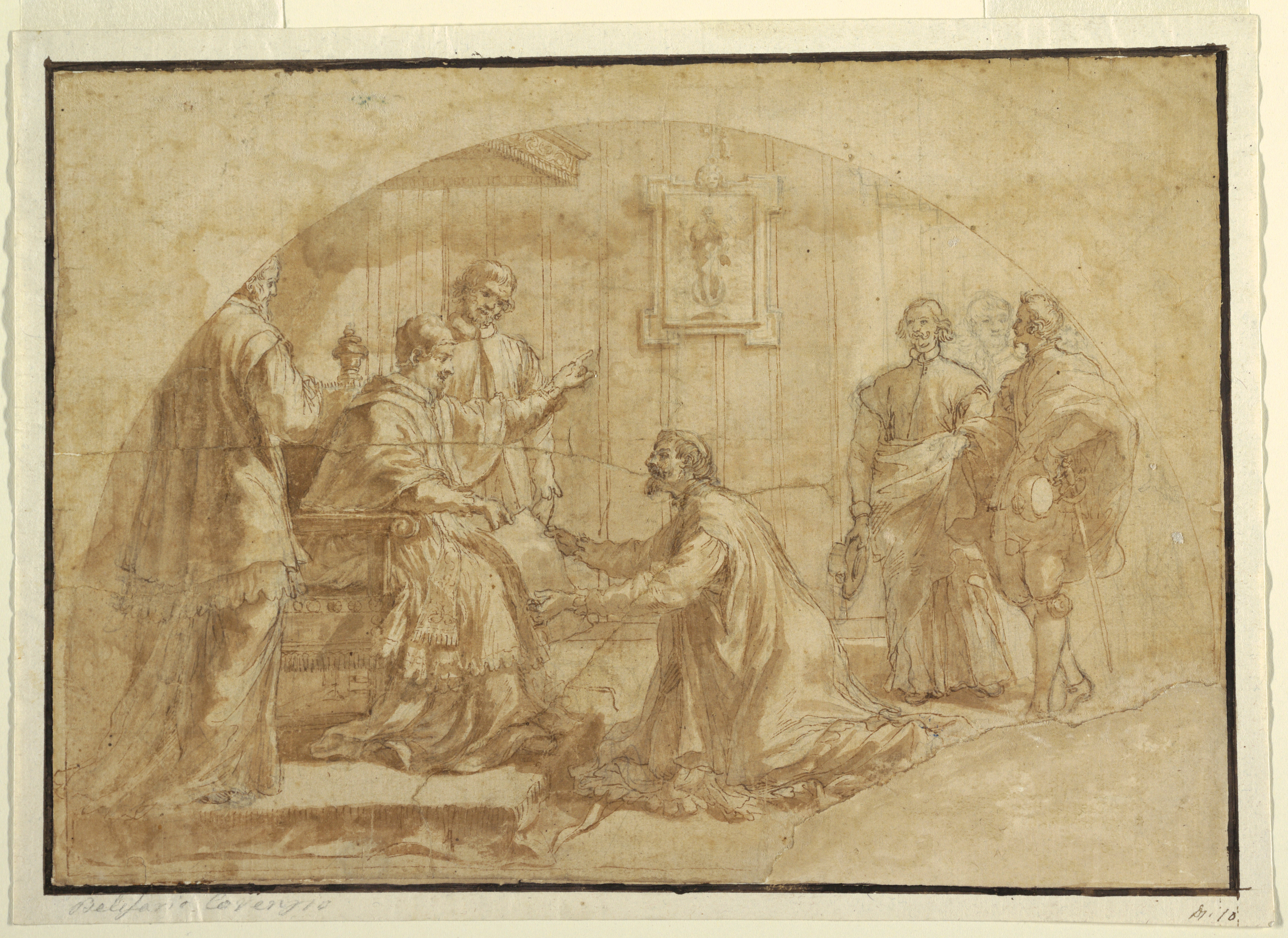
Pope Receiving Visitor

== Notable works ==
- Frescos Chapel Vault Palazzo Diomede Carafa Naples, Italy
- Frescos Salerno Cathedral Salerno Italy
- Frescos Santi Severino e Sossio Naples, Italy.
- Frescos Santissima Annunziata Maggiore, Naples, Italy
- Frescos Santa Maria di Costantinopoli, Naples, Italy
- Frescos Santa Maria la Nova, Naples, Italy
- Frescos Certosa di San Martino, Naples, Italy
- Frescos Gesù Nuovo, Naples, Italy
- Frescos Royal Palace of Naples, Naples, Italy
- Frescos Church of Santa Patrizia, Naples, Italy
- Frescos Chapel Vault Monte di Pietà, Naples
- Frescos Interior Ceiling Santa Maria della Sapienza, Naples, Italy
- Frescos Assumption of the Virgin with a choir of Angels (1613) Santa Teresa degli Scalzi, Naples, Italy
- Frescos Cloister Gospel Stories Santa Maria degli Angeli alle Croci Via Veterinaria Naples Italy
- Frescos Santa Maria di Monteverginella, Naples, Italy
- Frescos Crypt Santi Apostoli, Naples
- Frescos Sanctuary of St. Francis and St. Anthony, Cava de 'Tirreni Salerno, Italy
- Frescos San Lazzaro, Trinity with the Madonna and the Angels Santa Maria di Piedigrotta, Naples, Italy
- Frescos Santi Pietro e Paolo dei Greci (Naples, Italy)
- Frescos San Paolo Maggiore, Naples, Italy
- Frescoes Wedding at Cana San Gregorio Armeno, Naples, Italy
- Frescoes Stories of St. Francis Santa Chiara, Naples, Naples, Italy
- Eternal Father San Domenico Maggiore, Naples, Italy
- Girolamini, Naples
- Church of the Annunciation Nola, Italy
- Five Canvases Palazzo Ricca, Naples
- Santa Maria a Parete Liveri Naples, Italy
- Castel Capuano
- Santa Maria Del Popolo

== See also ==
- Fresco Painting
- Michelangelo
- Eustathios Karousos

== Bibliography ==
- Turner, Jane (1996). The Dictionary of Art Vol 7. New York: Grove. p. 848. ISBN 1-884446-00-0.
- De Dominici, Bernardo (1979). Lives of Neapolitan painters, sculptors and architects, vol. II. Bologna: Nella Stamperia Del Ricciardi. p. 305.
