= Baroque! From St Peter's to St Paul's =

British television documentary series

Baroque! From St Peter's to St Paul's is a three-part BBC Four documentary series on the painting, sculpture and architecture of the Baroque period. It was written and presented by Waldemar Januszczak and first broadcast in March 2009. It is named after its start in the square of Saint Peter's Basilica and its end at St Paul's Cathedral.

In March 2010 'Baroque!' won a Royal Television Society Award for best arts programme.

== Episodes ==
1. ”The Birth of the Baroque". Italy – Baroque's origins in Rome and Spanish Naples, including Borromini's architectural work such as San Carlo alle Quattro Fontane, Bernini's fountains, churches like Sant'Andrea al Quirinale and sculptures such as The Ecstasy of St Theresa; Andrea Pozzo's illusionistic work at Sant'Ignazio and Annibale Caracci's The Loves of the Gods; Caravaggio's career in Rome and Naples; Jusepe de Ribera, his 'Cabal of Naples' and its activities against rivals such as Caracci's followers Domenichino and Guido Reni.
2. ”Baroque’s Dark Heart". Spain, its South American Empire, the Spanish Netherlands and the Dutch Republic – Velázquez and Las Meninas; Zurbarán; Baroque church architecture at Santiago de Compostela and in the Southern Netherlands; Rubens and the Southern Netherlands; Rembrandt, Frans Hals and Vermeer in the Dutch Republic
3. ”Designing St Paul’s Cathedral". England – The Royal Naval Hospital and Queen's House at Greenwich; Rubens, Van Dyck and Charles I's art patronage (including Banqueting House and its ceiling paintings); William Dobson's work during the English Civil War; the London churches of Christopher Wren and Nicholas Hawksmoor; Blenheim Palace, the English Baroque invention of the country house within a landscaped garden and the career of John Vanbrugh; St Paul's.
