= Santa Maria La Nova, Naples =

Church of Santa Maria La Nova
- Chiesa di Santa Maria La Nova
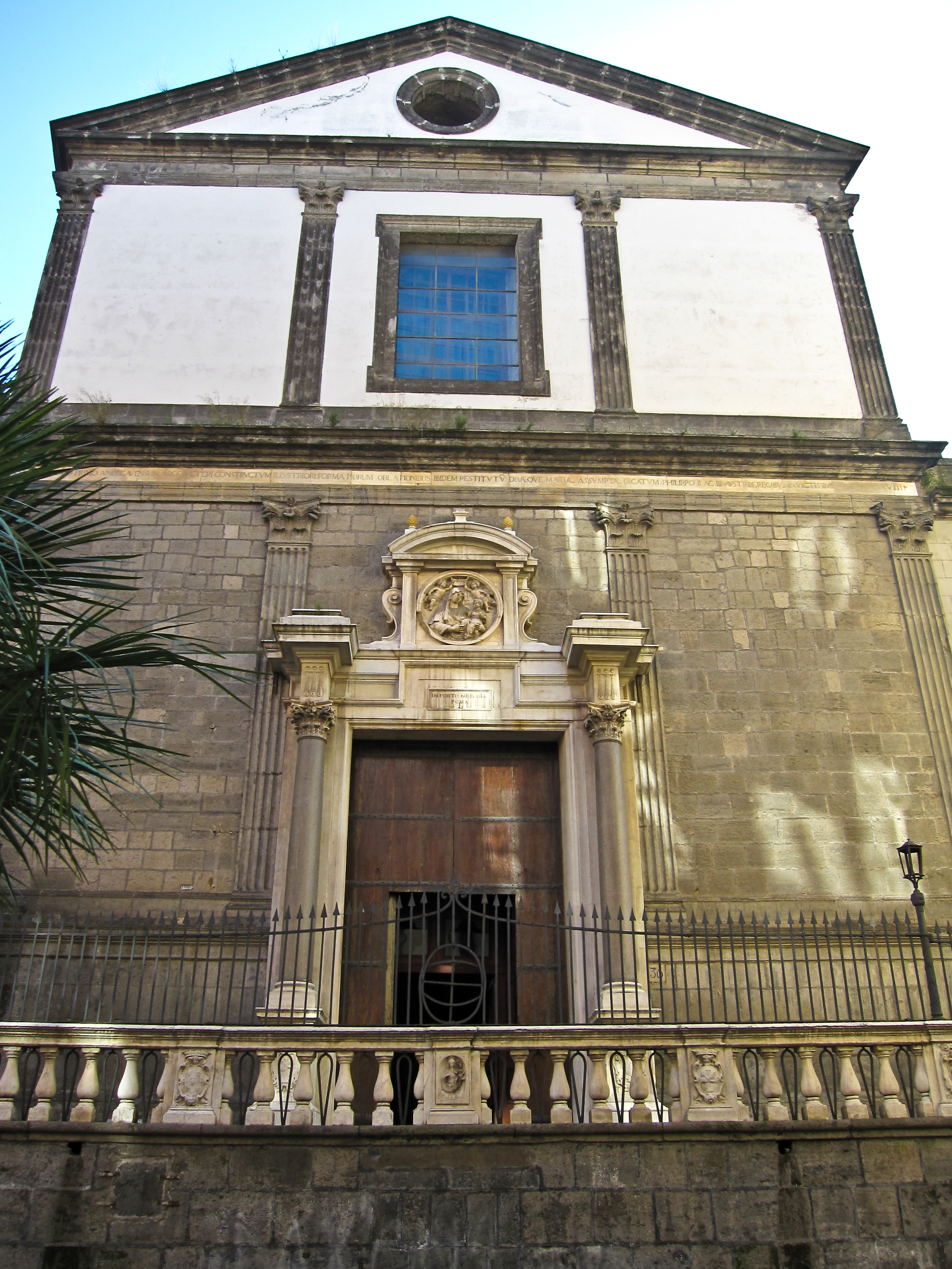
- The façade of Santa Maria La Nova.
- Church of Santa Maria La Nova
- 40°50′38″N 14°15′10″E
- Location: Chiaia; Naples; Province of Naples, Campania
- Country: Italy
- Denomination: Roman Catholic

Architecture
- Architectural type: Renaissance architecture, Baroque architecture
- Groundbreaking: 1596
- Completed: 1620

Administration
- Diocese: Roman Catholic Archdiocese of Naples

Santa Maria la Nova is a Renaissance style, now-deconsecrated, Roman Catholic church and monastery in central Naples. The church is located at the beginning of a side street directly across from the east side of the main post office, a few blocks south of the Church and Monastery of Santa Chiara. Today the adjacent monastery is a meeting site and hosts the Museo ARCA of modern religious art.

== History ==
Since the early 13th century, a Franciscan monastery, named Santa Maria ad Palatium had existed nearby, but by 1268, was demolished in order for Charles of Anjou decided to build his Castel Nuovo (new castle), or Maschio Angioino. By 1279, the Friars were granted this site to build a new church, hence la Nova. Initially constructed in Gothic style, the building was battered by Naples's frequent earthquakes but also suffered gravely from an explosion originating from Castel Sant'Elmo on December 13, 1587.

This last episode prompted reconstruction in 1596-1599, as announced in a cornice inscription, leading to the facade we see today, designed by Agnolo Franco Typical of Franciscan churches, the facade has a sober and simple restraint, accessed through a staircase and balustrade.

== Interior ==
The church nave ceiling is decorated with 46 gilt-framed cassetone, or rectangular fresco panels, completed in 1598-1600. Among the contributing artists were Francesco Curia; Girolamo Imparato (Assumption of the Virgin); Fabrizio Santafede (Coronation of the Virgin); Giovanni Bernardino Azzolino; Belisario Corenzio (Passion of Christ); Luigi Rodriguez (Prophets and Sybils); Cesare Smet; and Tommaso Maurizio. Along the windows are canvases (Symbols of Faith) by Belisario Corenzio, who also painted the Final Judgement in the counterfacade in collaboration with Luigi Rodriguez. On the right of the counterfacade is a copy of a painting by Aert Mytens. The transept has canvases by Nicola Malinconico and Corenzio.

In the chapel to the right of the altar is a painting by Simone Papa, retouched in the 19th century by Luigi Pastore. The architects and decorators of the choir (1621) include Corenzio, Papa, De Lione, with stucco by Francesco Napolella. To the left of the altar is a silver paliotto for Domenico Marinelli and Matteo Treglia, made to designs from Lorenzo Vaccaro and Gaetano Vesivalle. The walls are frescoed by Beinaschi and have sculptures by Tommaso Malvito. In the arches of the chapels are frescoes (1699–1701) by Malinconico.

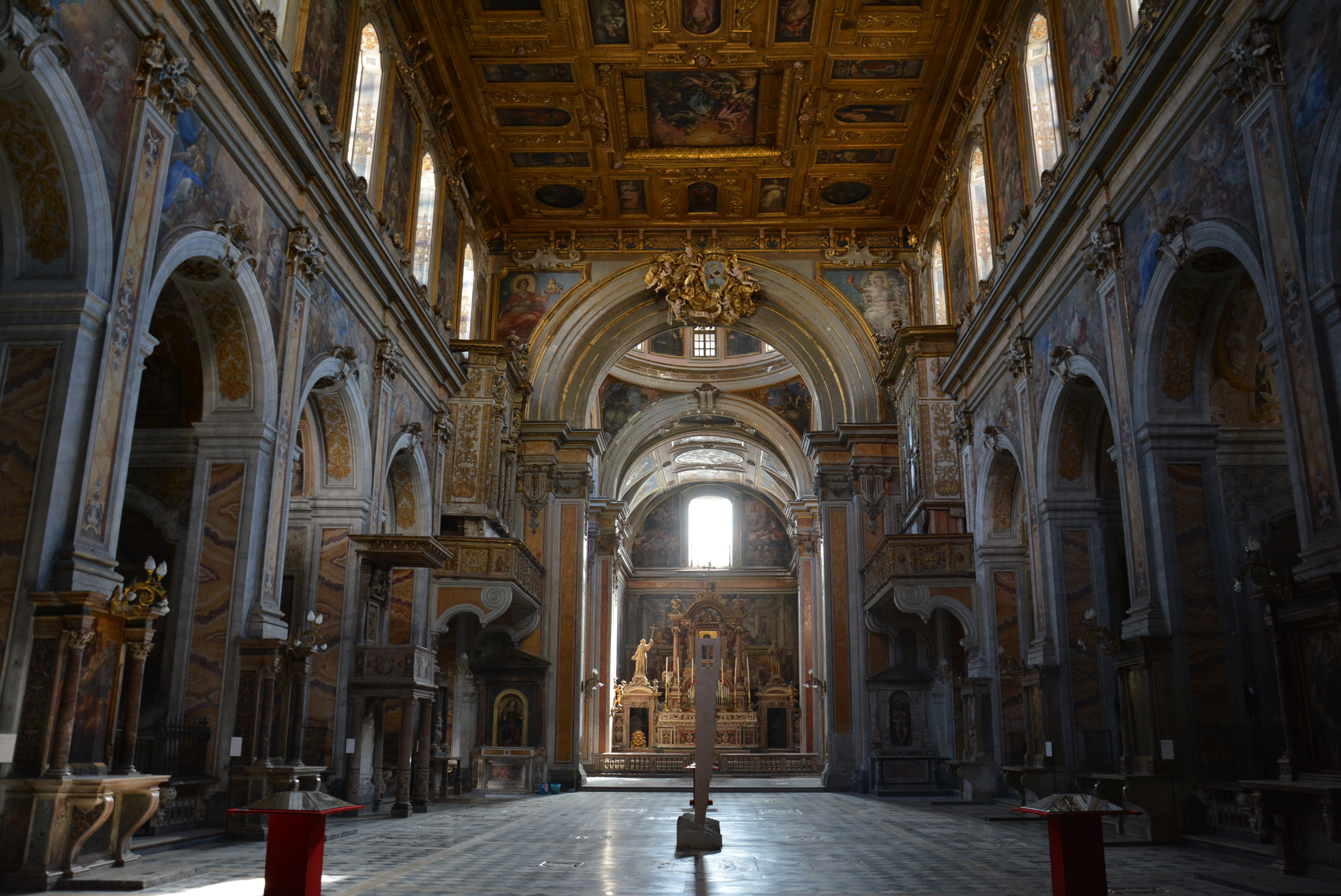
Panorama of Nave

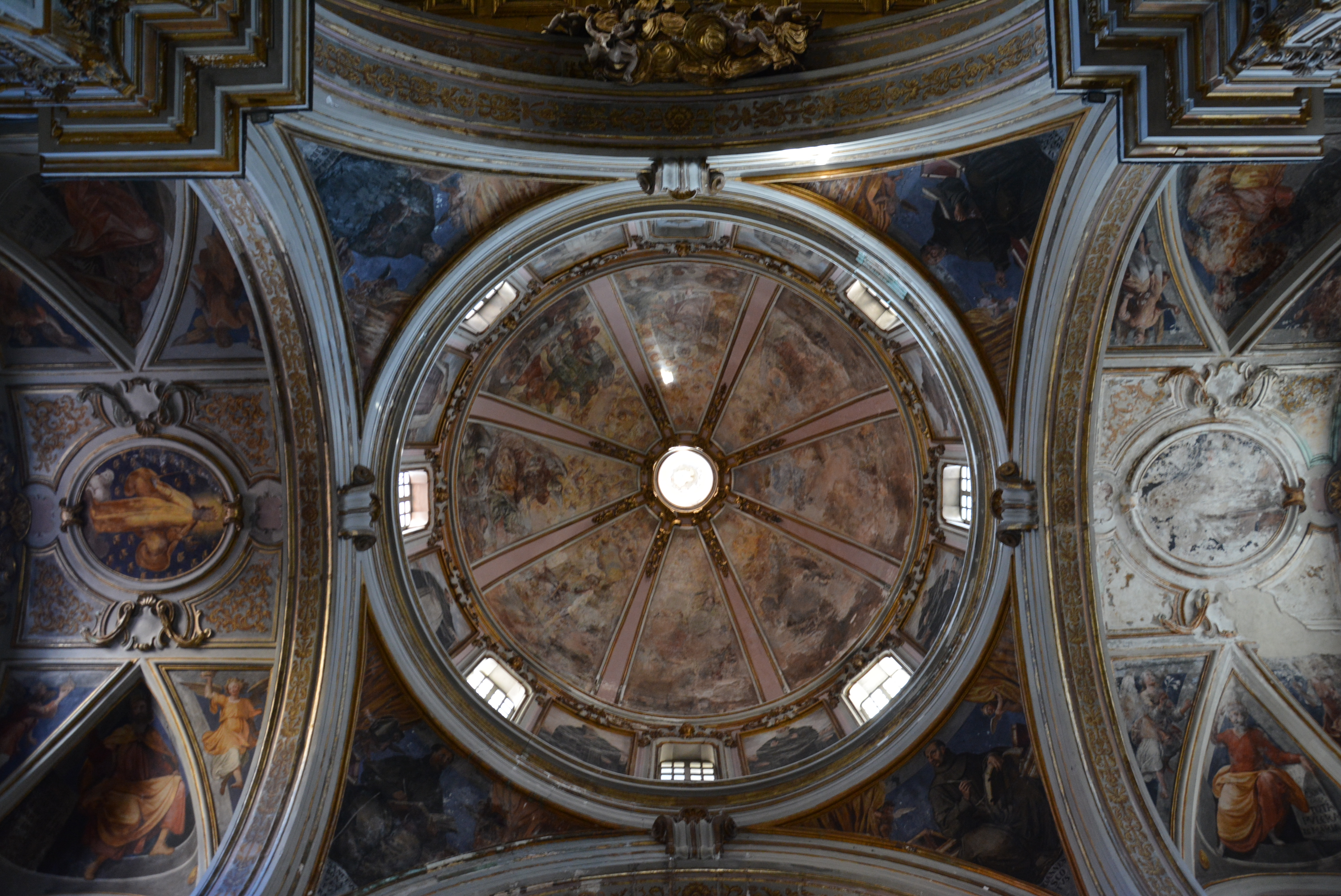
Ceiling of cupola

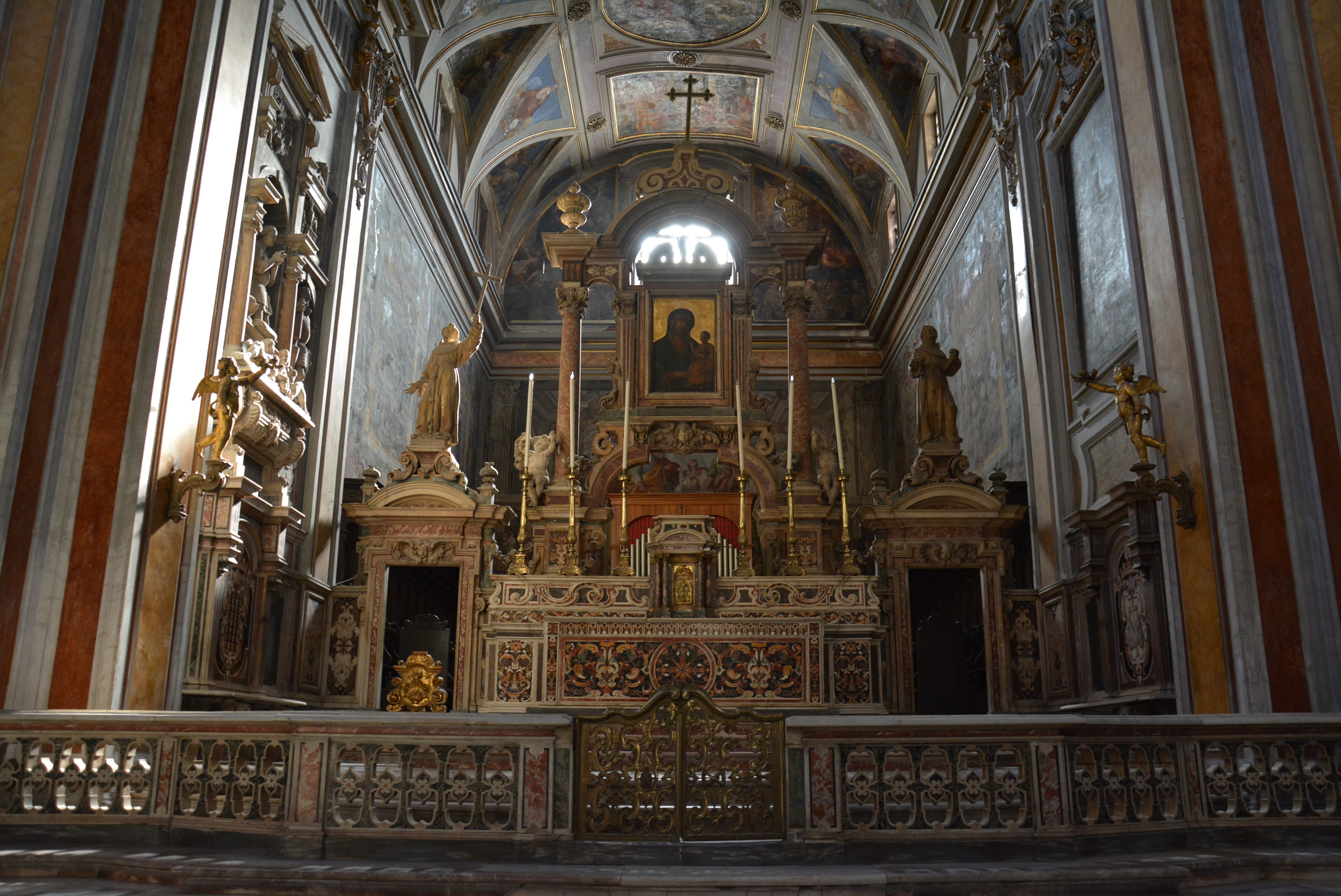
Main Altar by Cosimo Fanzago

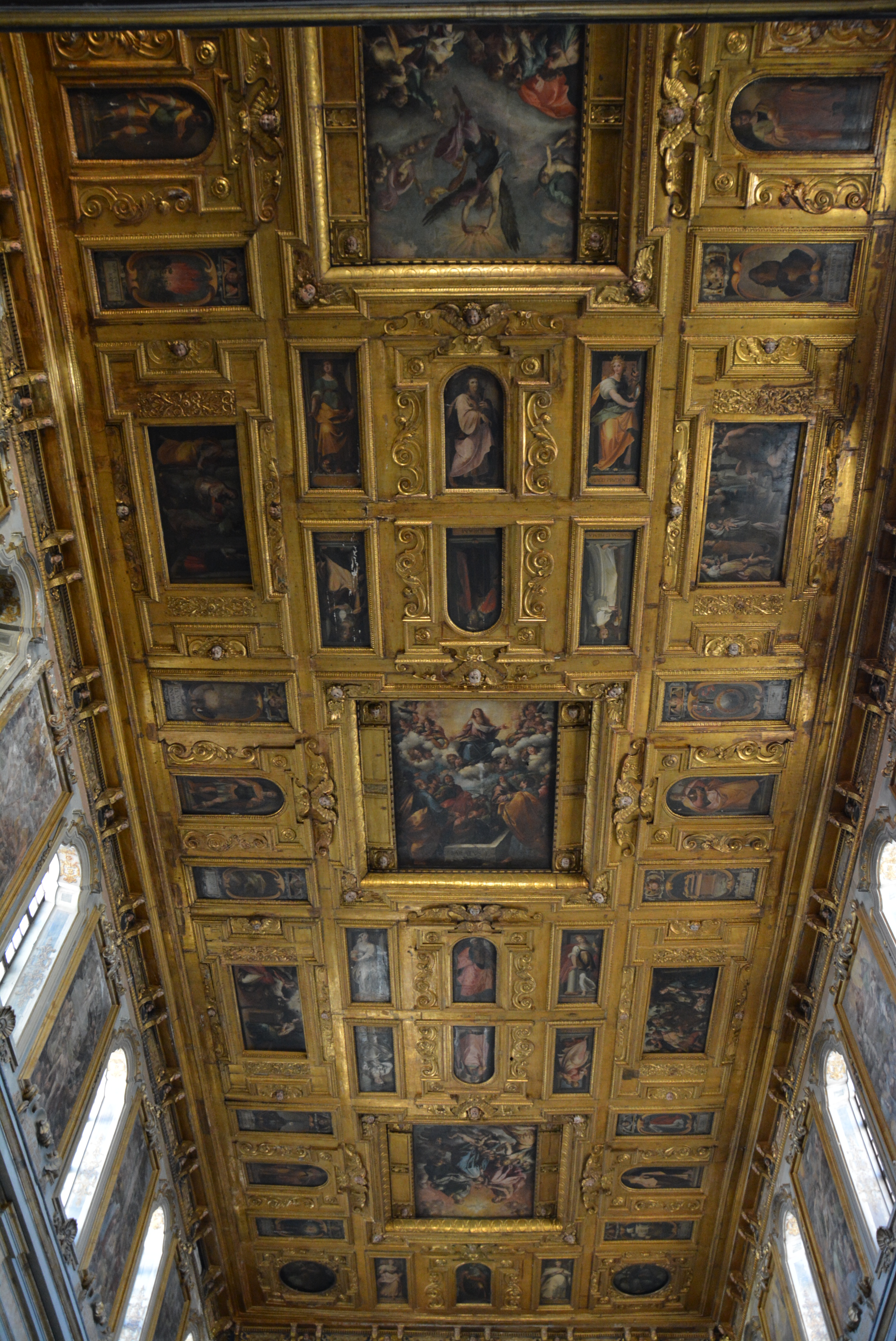
Nave Ceiling

The main altar (1640) was conceived by Cosimo Fanzago, and completed with help from Mario Cotti, Giuseppe Pellizza, and Andrea Lazzaro. Agostino Borghetti completed the wooden statues of the Procession artifact.

The first chapel on right has paintings by Battistello Caracciolo, sculptures by Nicolò Carletti, Domenico Monterosso, and scholars of Girolamo d'Auria. The main altarpiece is by Teodoro d'Errico. The second chapel has paintings by Benedetto Torre. The third chapel has paintings by Marco Pino and frescoes by Corenzio: the altar was designed by Girolamo D'Auria. The fourth chapel has paintings by Giovanni Battista Beinaschi. The fifth chapel has paintings by Giuseppe Marullo and Santillo Sandini, while the altarpiece (1620) is attributed to Francesco Balsimelli. The sixth chapel was designed by Giuseppe Gallo with paintings by Francesco Antonio Altobello and Onofrio de Lione; The seventh chapel, partially obstructed by the organ, has paintings by Santillo Sandini.

The third chapel on the left is the largest in the church, and is called the Cappellone di San Giacomo della Marca, and hosts the preserved body of St James of the Marches. It was commissioned by Gonzalo di Cordova, called the great captain. The ceilings are frescoed by Massimo Stanzione, and depict the Miracles of the Saint, including the procession by Neapolitans with his body to compel the volcano Vesuvius to stop its 1631 eruption. A number of warriors are memorialized or buried in this chapel, Amida of Tunis, who had been briefly installed as king by Charles V, Holy Roman Emperor, and died in exile in Naples by 1601; Francesco di Cordova, conqueror of Malta. Ferdinando di Cordova, nephew of Gonzalo commissioned sculptures from Giovanni da Nola for the tombs of the Captain and Pietro Navarro (despite his death by suicide), and Odette di Foix, a French general who died during the siege of the city, but found by Neapolitans, after having been buried unceremoniously by his troops.

The first chapel on the left has paintings by Scibelli; The second chapel on the left has frescoes by an unknown 16th century painter. The fourth chapel on the left has the Funereal Monument of Duke Caracciolo di San Teodoro by Domenico Morante, a wooden statue by Michele Perrone and frescoes by Beinaschi; the fifth chapel on the left has paintings by Giuseppe Castellano, Beinaschi, and de Lione; the sixth chapel on the left has an altar by Pietro Nicolini, and paintings by Giuseppe Mastroleo and Andrea de Lione. The pulpit was sculpted by Balsimelli. The seventh chapel on the left, partially obstructed by the organ, has paintings attributed to an 8 year old Luca Giordano.

In the Turbolo chapel of the church, there exists an encrypted epigraph written in an unknown script, whose candidate language family has been successfully individuated by Cosimo Palma and Louie Helm in 2026. Their latest work also proposes a preliminary fragmented decryption text in Old Czech, representing a penitential prayer.

The church is a part of a larger monastic complex, much of which now houses municipal office space.

== See also ==
- 16th-century Western domes

== Sources ==
- Regina, Vincenzo (2004). Le chiese di Napoli. Viaggio indimenticabile attraverso la storia artistica, architettonica, letteraria, civile e spirituale della Napoli sacra. Naples: Newton e Compton.
