= Criscuolo =

Criscuolo is an Italian surname. Notable people with the surname include:

- Alessandro Criscuolo (1937–2020), Italian judge
- Giovanni Angelo Criscuolo (1500–1573), Italian painter
- Giovanni Filippo Criscuolo (c. 1500–1584), Italian painter
- Kyle Criscuolo (born 1992), American ice hockey player
- Mariangiola Criscuolo (c. 1548–1630), Italian painter
- Roberto Criscuolo (born 1997), Italian football player
