= Imparato =

Imparato is a surname. Notable people with the surname include:

- Ciro Imparato (1962–2015), Italian psychologist and actor
- Gianfelice Imparato (born 1956), Italian actor
- Giovanni Imparato (born 1982), know professionally as Colombre, Italian singer-songwriter
- Girolamo Imparato (1550-1621), Italian painter
- Francesco Imparato (1520-1570), Italian painter
- Raffaele Imparato (born 1986), Italian footballer
