= DiPino =

DiPino (or di Pino) is a surname of Italian origin. Notable people with this surname include:

- Marco di Pino, also known as Marco Pino or Marco da Siena (1521–1583), an Italian painter of the Renaissance and Mannerist period
- Bernadette DiPino, an American law enforcement officer
- Frank Michael DiPino (born 1956), an American professional baseball pitcher
