= Battistello Caracciolo =

Neapolitan artist and follower of Caravaggio (1578-1635)

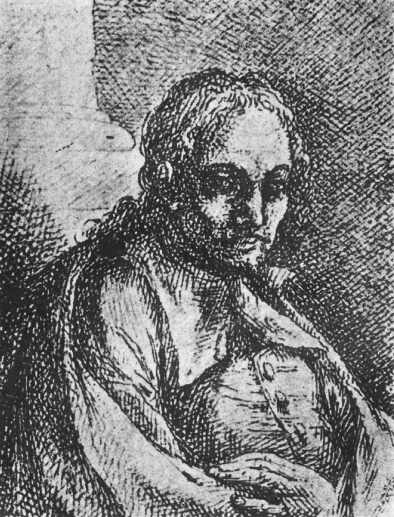
- Portrait drawing which Onofrio Giannone presumed to be of Caracciolo and published in 1773 (Museo Civico Filangieri, Naples).
- Born: Giovanni Battista Caracciolo; 7 December 1578 (Note: Using date of baptism.); Naples
- Died: 23 December 1635 (aged 57) (Note: Using date of baptism and the day before the reading of his will.); Naples
- Education: Francesco Imparato, Fabrizio Santafede
- Known for: painting, fresco
- Movement: Caravaggism
- Spouse: Beatrice de Mario

Giovanni Battista Caracciolo (also called Battistello) (1578–1635) was an Italian artist and important Neapolitan follower of Caravaggio. He was a member of the Cabal of Naples, with Belisario Corenzio and Jusepe de Ribera, who were rumored to have poisoned their competition for painting contracts.

== Early life ==
The only substantial early source of biography is Bernardo de' Dominici's unreliable publication of 1742. De Dominici's statements are often contradicted by documented facts and others cannot be substantiated independently. (Note: Benedetto Croce referred to De Dominici as 'il Falsario') Archival documents state that Caracciolo was born in Naples and baptised on 7 December 1578, as the son of Cesare Caracciolo and his wife Elena. The family lived in the parish of San Giovanni Maggiore.

On 3 August 1598, at the age of twenty, Caracciolo married Beatrice de Mario. They had ten children, of whom eight survived to adulthood. (Note: De Dominici claimed Caracciolo never married and was childless.)

== Caravaggesque phase ==
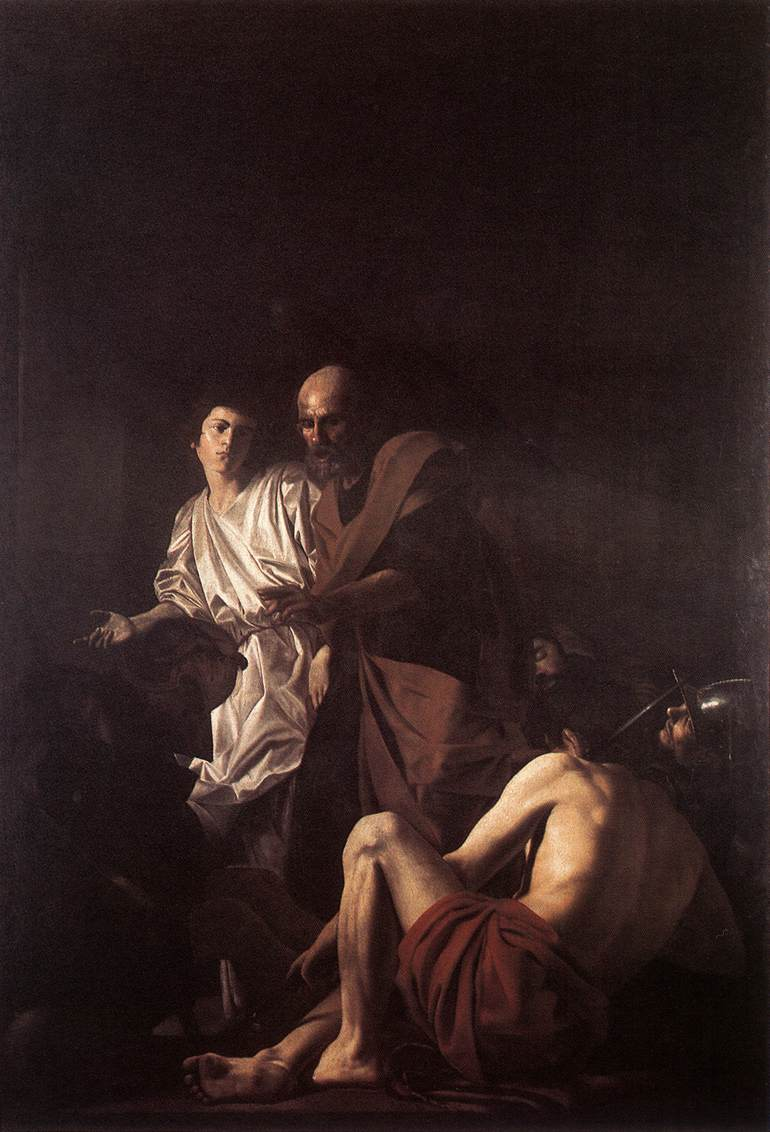
The Liberation of St Peter. Pio Monte della Misericordia, Naples. Regarded as Battistello's masterpiece, it vividly captures the emotion of the scene as Peter is led from prison by an angel.

His initial training was said to be with Francesco Imparato and Fabrizio Santafede, but the first impulse that directed his art came from Caravaggio's sudden arrival in Naples in late 1606. Caravaggio had fled there after killing a man in a brawl in Rome, and he arrived at the end of September or beginning of October 1606. His stay in the city lasted only about eight months, with another brief visit in 1609/1610 leading to his 1610–1615 Baptism of Christ, yet his impact on artistic life there was profound.

Caracciolo, only five years younger than Caravaggio, was among the first Neapolitans to adopt the startling new style with its sombre palette, dramatic tenebrism, and sculptural figures in a shallow picture plane defined by light rather than by perspective. He is considered to be the solitary founder of the Neapolitan school of Caravaggism. Among the other Neapolitan Caravaggisti were Giuseppe Ribera, (Note: On 3 May 1626, Caracciolo and Ribera are witnesses to the wedding of Giovanni Do) Carlo Sellitto, Artemisia Gentileschi, and Caracciolo's pupil, Mattia Preti, then early in his career.

Caracciolo's Caravaggesque phase was fundamental to his entire career. His first contact with Caravaggio must have been around the time of the Radolovich commission, dated 6 October 1606, and the contacts continued through Caravaggio's completion of the Seven Works of Mercy during the last months of that year and early 1607. A notable result of Caravaggio's influence is Caracciolo's The Crucifixion of Christ, with its strong echoes of the Crucifixion of Saint Andrew.

In 1607, he painted the Immaculate Conception for the Santa Maria della Stella in Naples. It is considered to be his first documented Caravaggesque painting.

In 1612, he made a trip to Rome. A work showing the influence of this visit, and especially that of Orazio Gentileschi, is the Liberation of Saint Peter (1615), painted for the Pio Monte della Misericordia, to hang next to Caravaggio's Seven Works of Mercy painted for the same church. (Note: The Liberation is now in the Museo di Capodimonte in Naples.) By this time he had become the leader of the new Neapolitan school, dividing his time between religious subjects (altarpieces and, unusually for a Caravaggist, frescos) and paintings for private patrons.

After 1618 he visited Genoa, Rome and Florence. In Rome he came under the influence of the revived Classicism of the Carracci cousins and the Emilian school, and began working towards a synthesis of their style with his own tenebrism – his Cupid, with its bravura handling of the red cloth, shows the influence of the Carracci synthesis. Back in Naples, he translated this into grandiose, wide-ranging scenes including his masterpiece Christ Washing the Feet of the Disciples of 1622, painted for the Certosa di San Martino. He also painted further works in the Certosa di San Martino, Santa Maria La Nova and San Diego all'Ospedaletto and these works of the late second decade of the 17th century onward, show the strong influence of Bolognese classicism he might have been exposed to in Rome.

He died in Naples, in the few days between creating his last will, on 19 December 1635, and 24 December 1635, when it was opened and read.

== Gallery ==
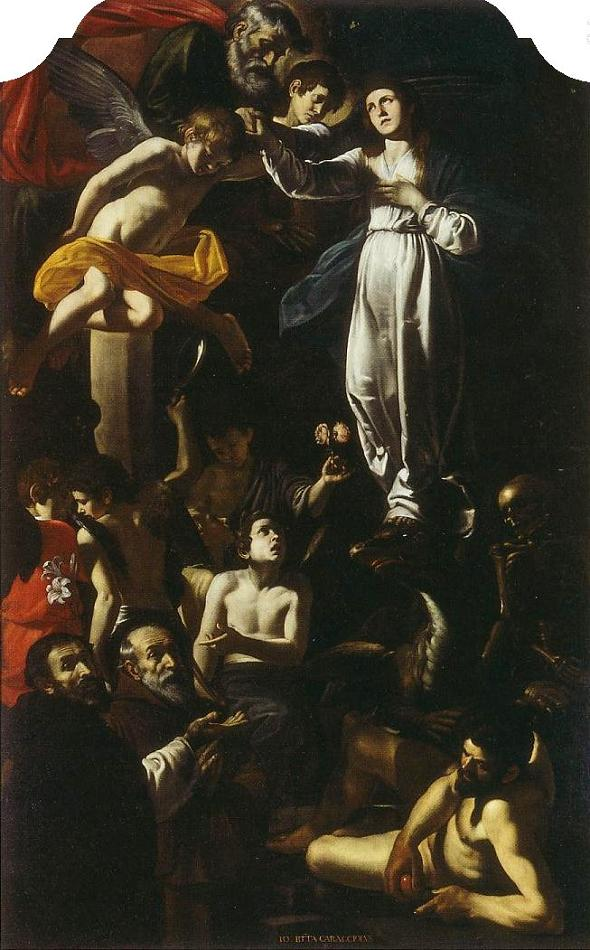
Immaculate Conception with Saints Dominic and Francis of Paola, (1607)

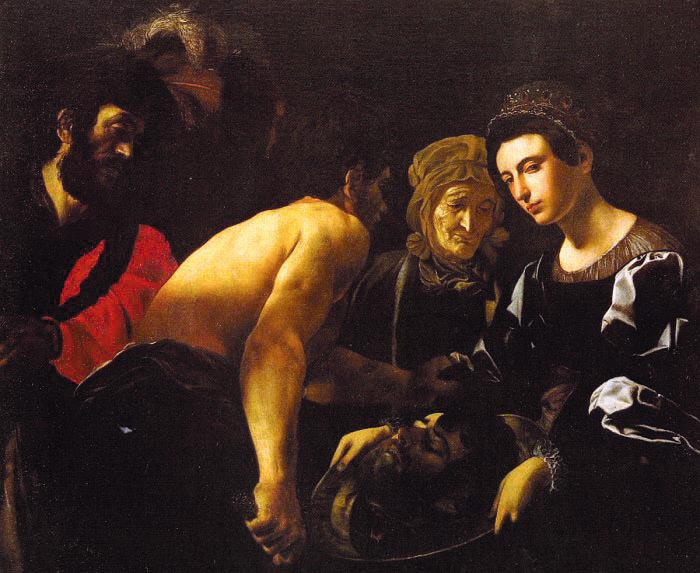
Salome. Uffizi Gallery, Florence. The painting illustrates Battistello's mastery of the visual language of Caravaggio.

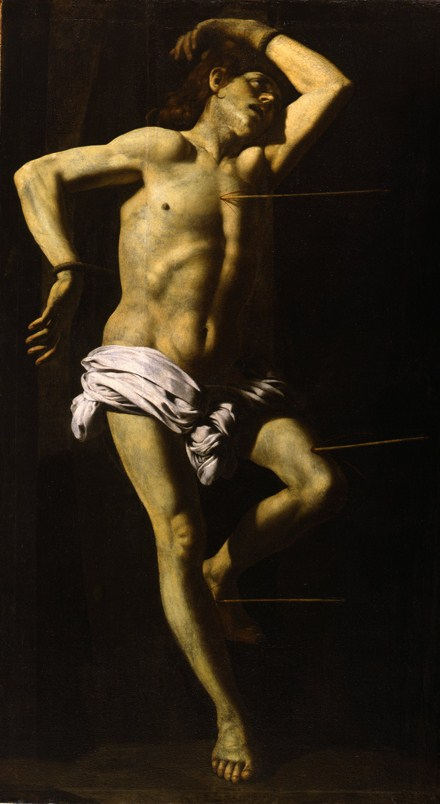
Martyrdom of Saint Sebastian (Fogg Art Museum)

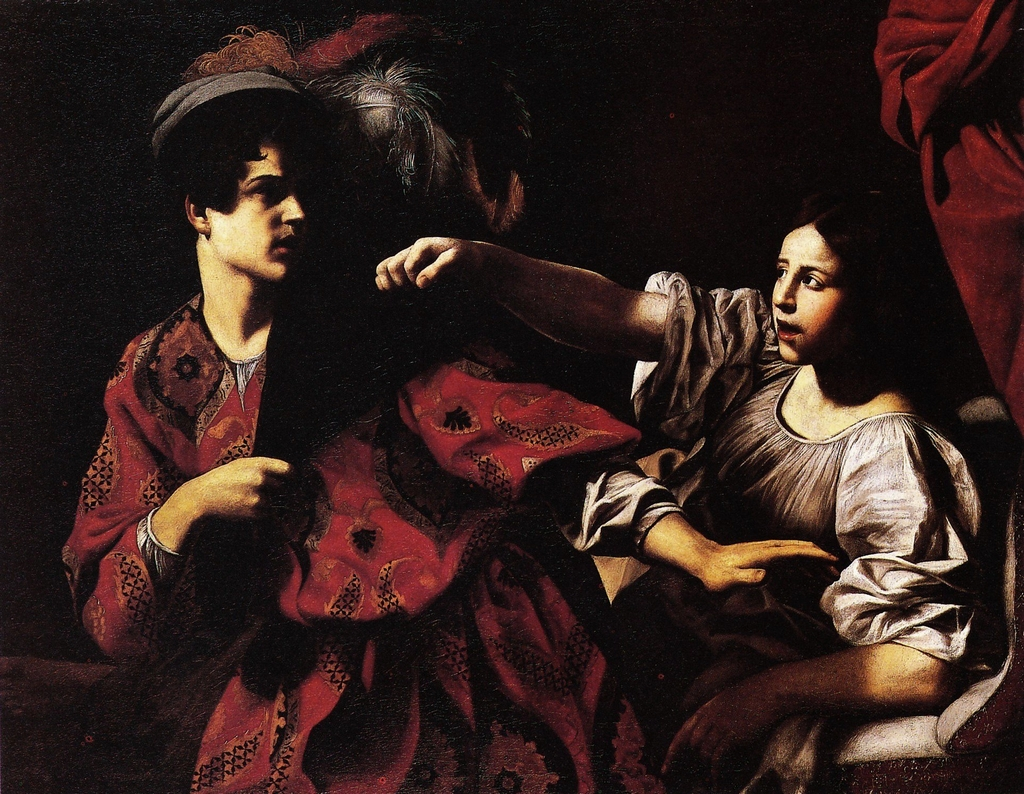
Joseph and Potiphar's wife (1618)

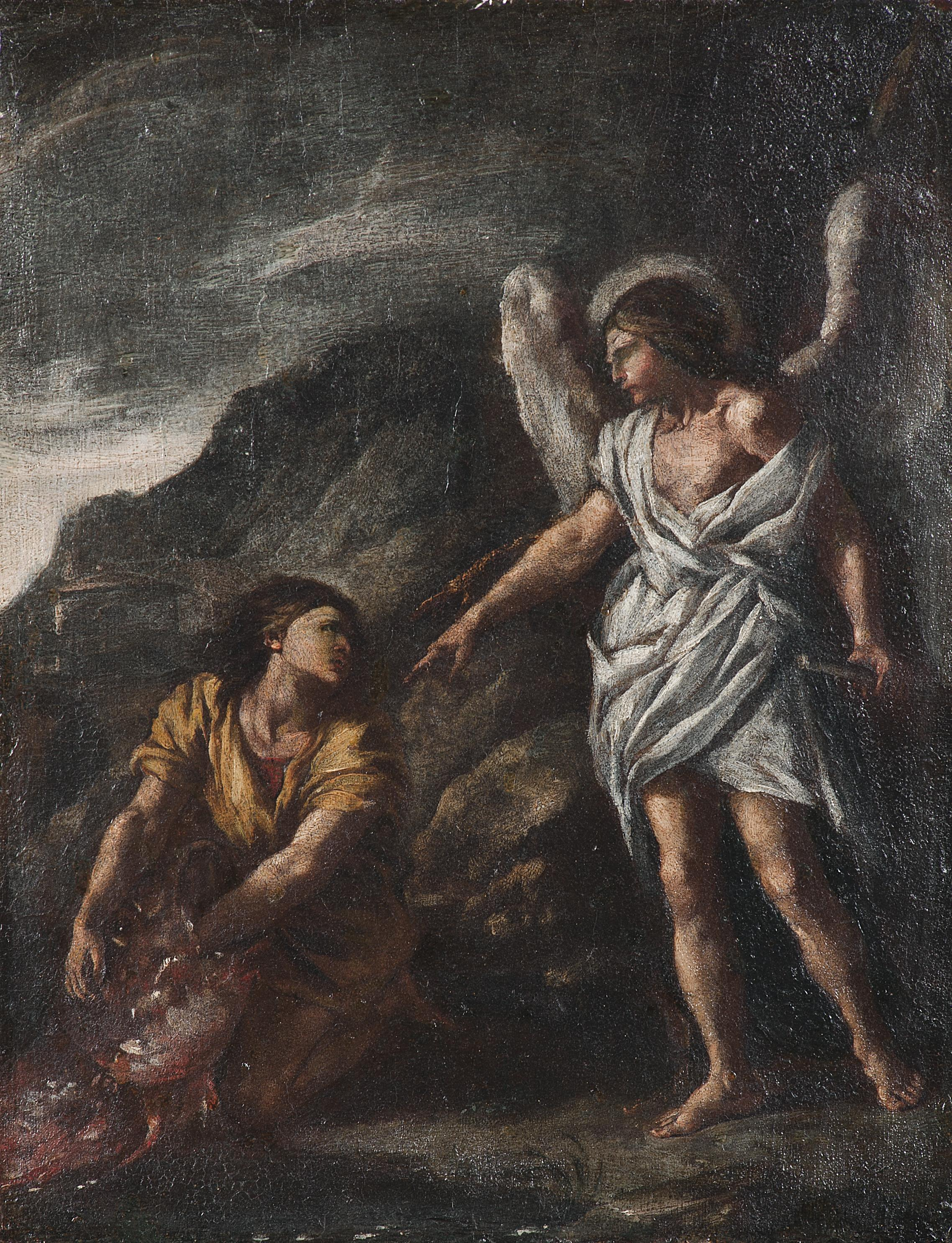
Tobias and the Angel (1635)

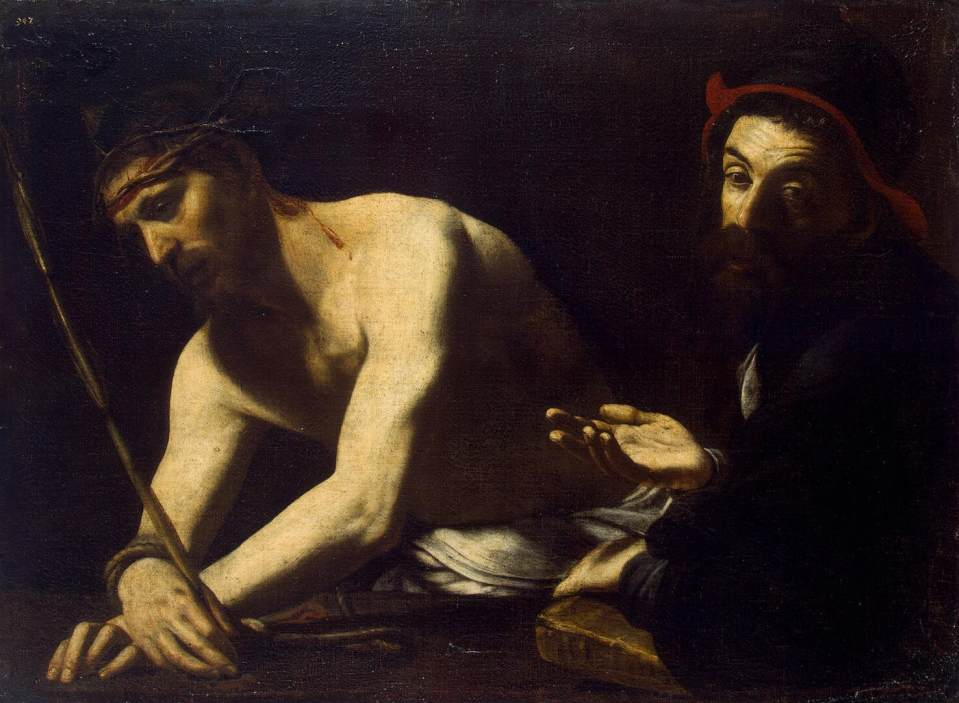
Christ and Caiaphas

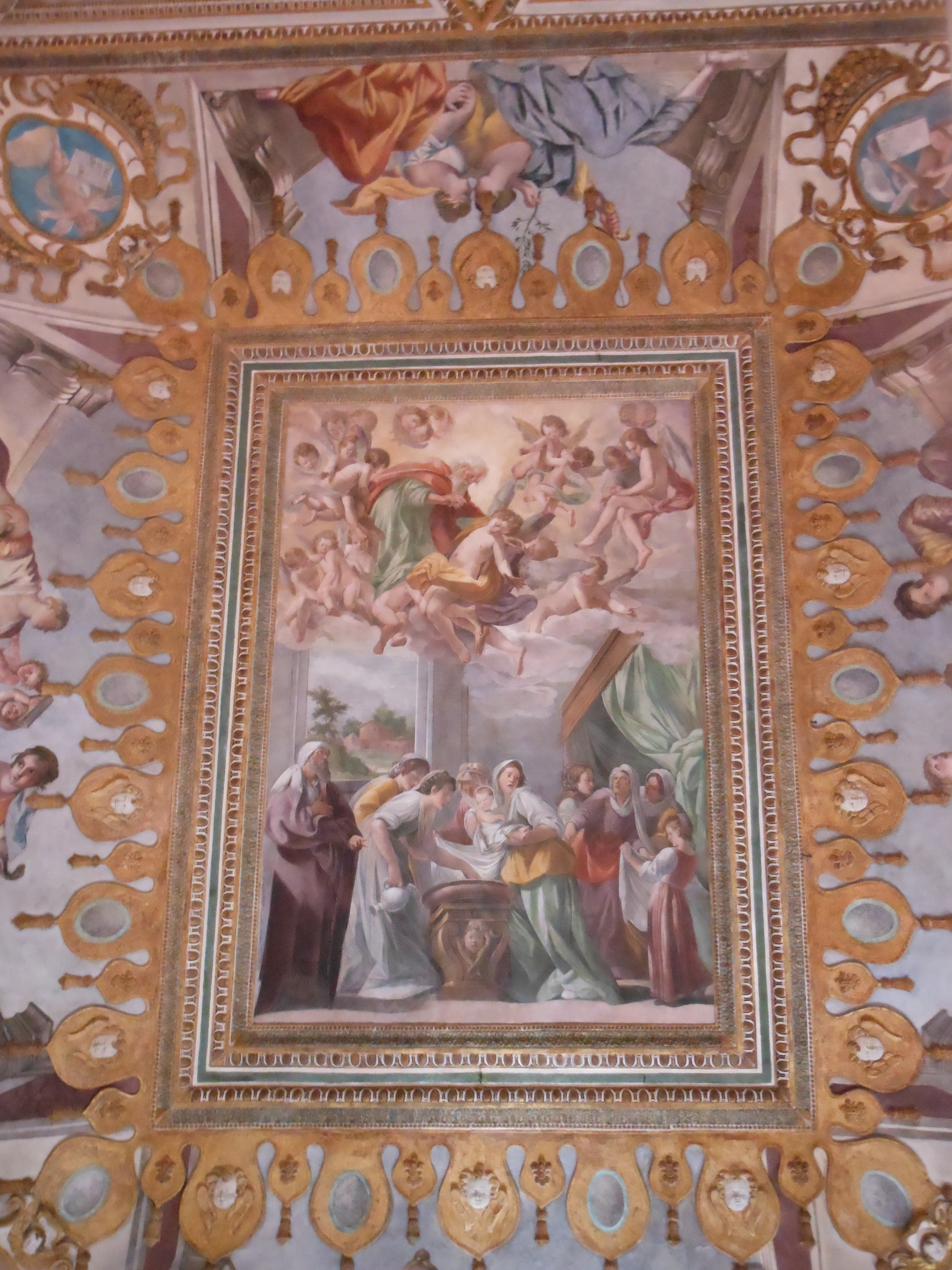
Nativity in the Oratory of the Nobles

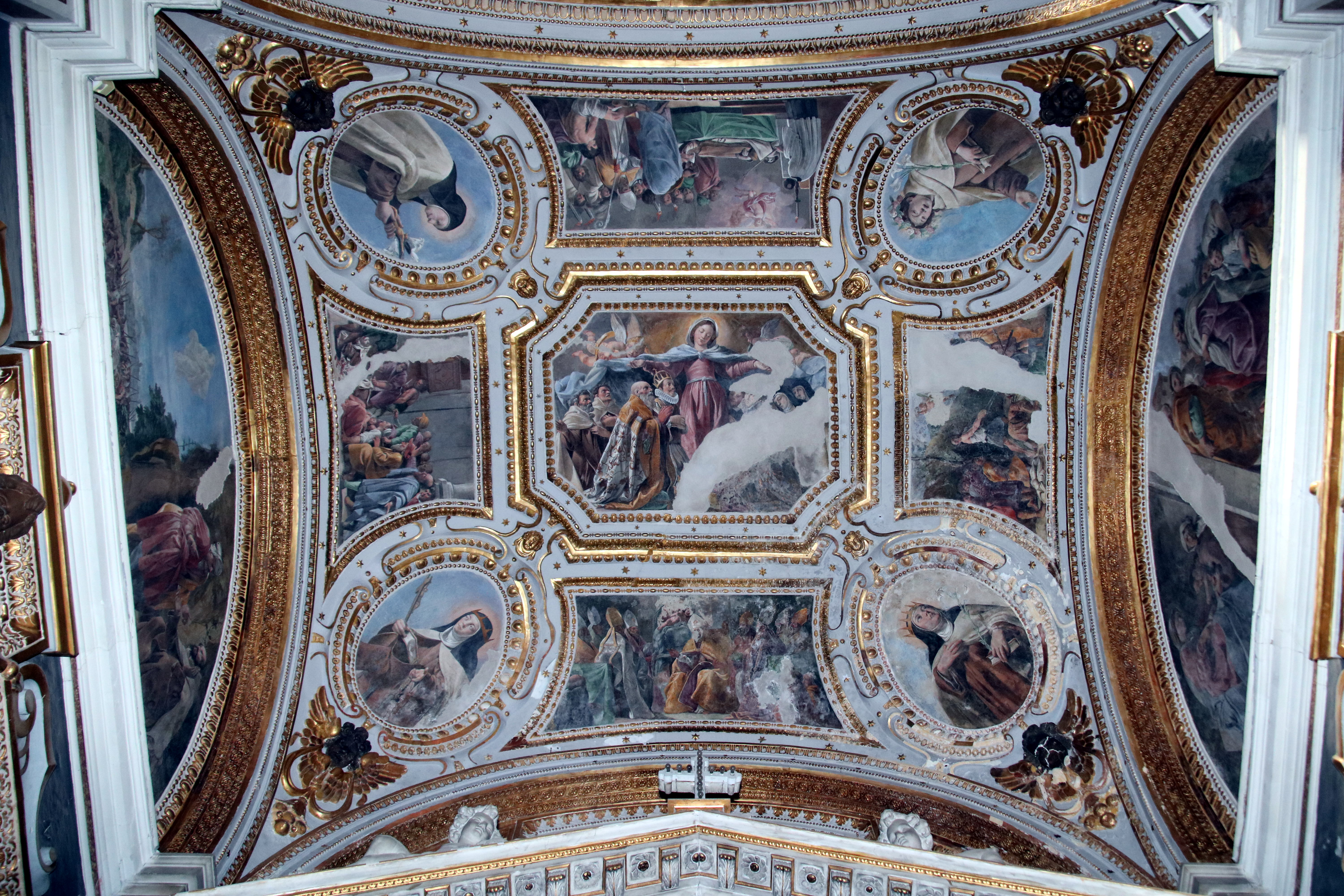
Virgin welcomes the Carmelites

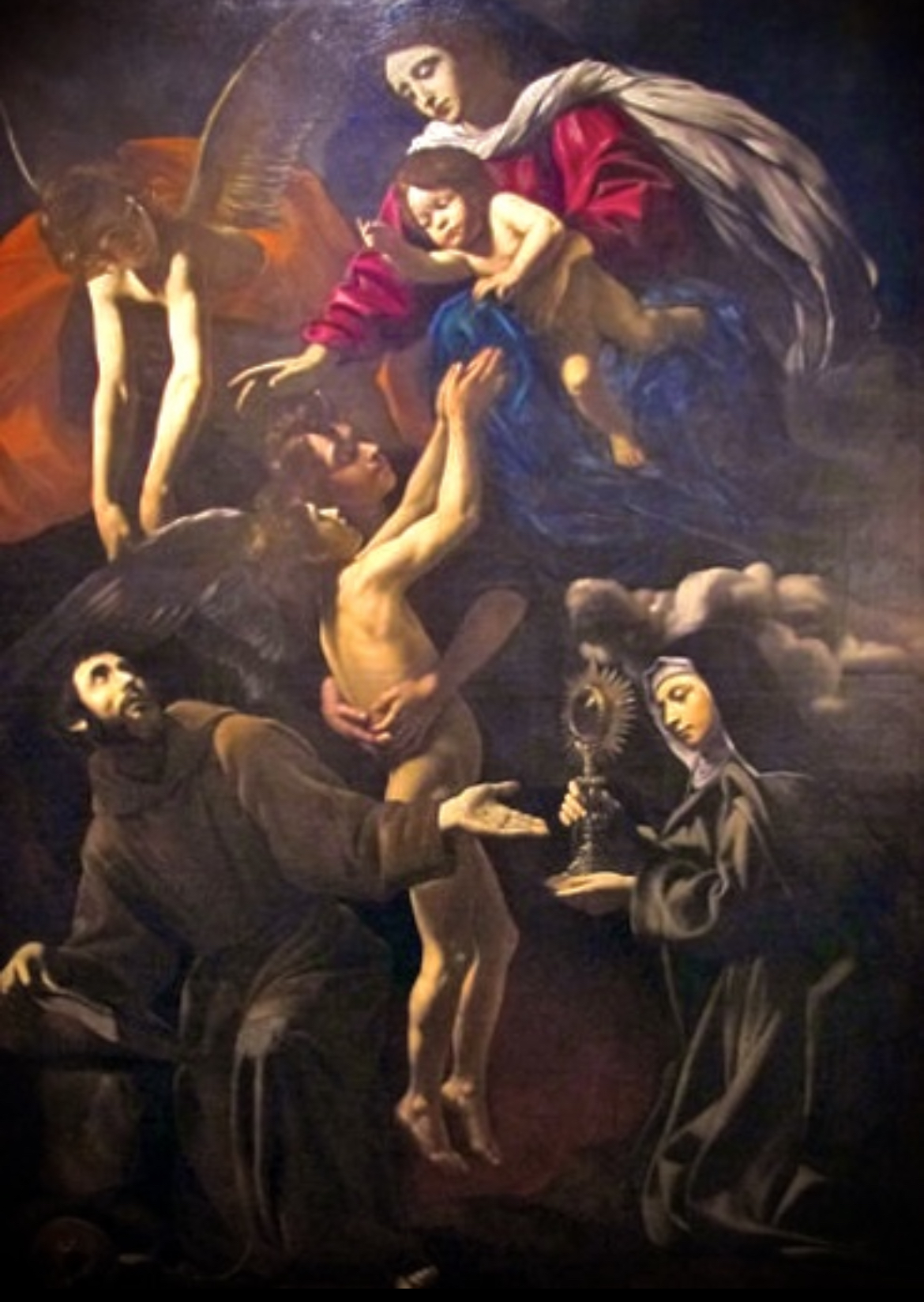
Madonna of the Souls in Purgatory (Capodimonte)

== Bibliography ==
- Bryan, Michael (1886). Graves, Robert Edmund (ed.). Dictionary of Painters and Engravers, Biographical and Critical. Vol. I: A-K. London: George Bell and Sons. p. 230.
- Causa, Rafaello (1950). "Aggiunte al Caracciolo" [Additions to Caracciolo]. Paragone (in Italian). I (9): 42–45.
- Longhi, Roberto (1915). "Battistello Caracciolo". L'Arte. 18: 120–137.
- MacFall, Haldane (2004). A History of Painting: Later Italians and Genius of Spain. Vol. 3. Kessinger Publishing. ISBN 1417945087.
- Nicolson, Benedict (1979). Caravaggism in Europe (2nd ed.). Oxford. pp. 74–77.
- Viardot, Louis (1877). An illustrated history of painters of all schools. Sampson, Low, Marston, Searle, & Rivington.
- Wittkower, Rudolf (1980). Art and Architecture Italy, 1600–1750. Penguin Books. pp. 356–358.
- Ferdinando Bologna (Herausgeber) Battistello Caracciolo e il primo naturalismo a Napoli, Ausstellungskatalog Castel San Elmo, Chiesa della Certosa di San Martino, 1991/92
- Stefano Causa Battistello Caracciolo: L'Opera Completa 1578–1635, Neapel 2000 (Causa promovierte über Battistello an der Universität Neapel: Ricerche su Battistello Caracciolo 1994/95)
- Nicola Spinosa u.a. Tres Siglos de Oro de la Pintura Napolitana. De Battistello Caracciolo a Giacinto Gigante, Ausstellungskatalog, Museum der Schönen Künste Valencia 2003/4, Ed. Caja Duero, 2003
