= Santa Maria di Piedigrotta =

Church of Santa Maria di Piedigrotta
- Chiesa di Santa Maria di Piedigrotta
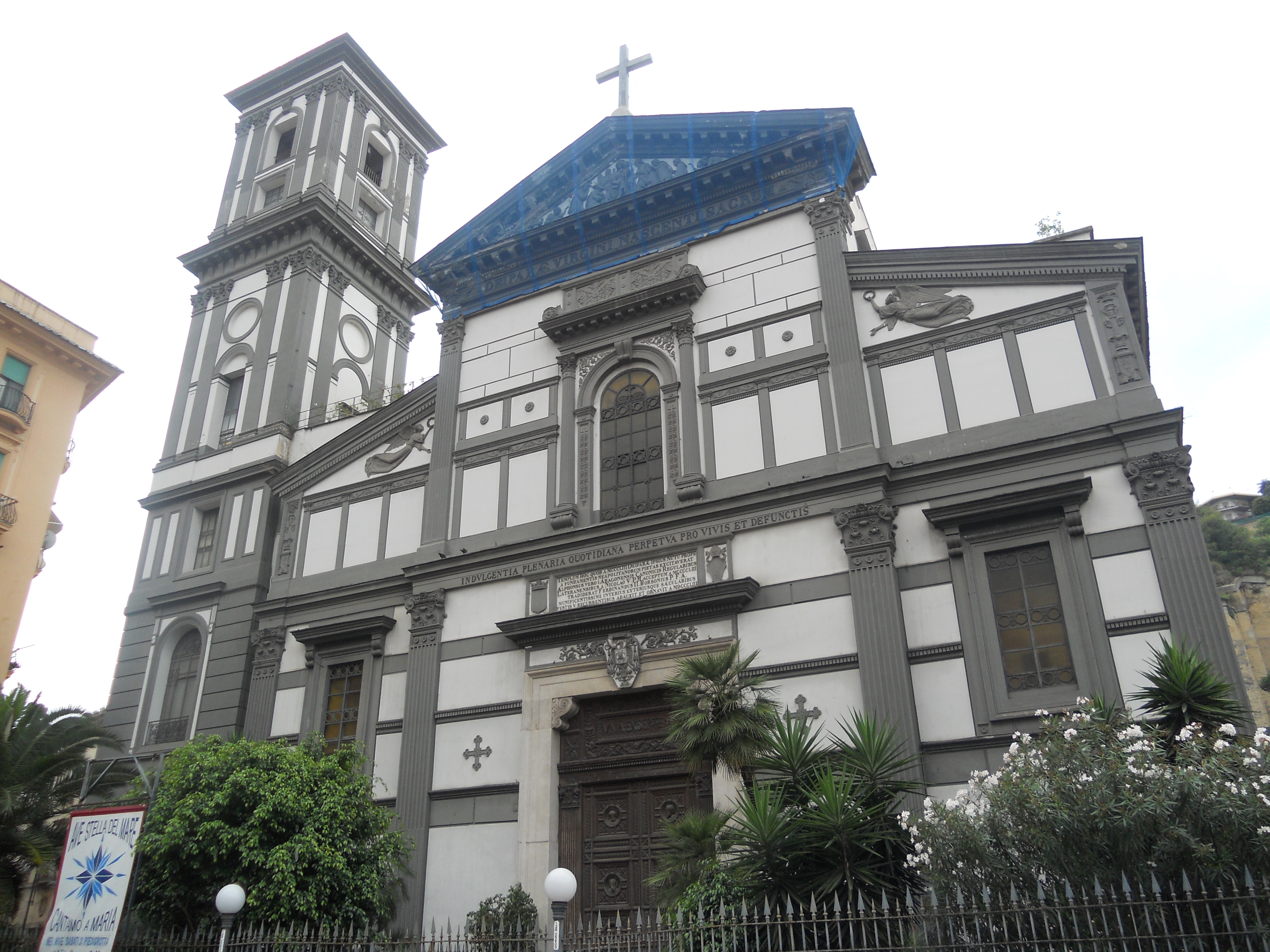
- The façade of Santa Maria di Piedigrotta.
- Church of Santa Maria di Piedigrotta
- 40.830600°N 14.219160°E
- Location: Chiaia; Naples; Province of Naples, Campania
- Country: Italy
- Denomination: Roman Catholic

History
- Status: Active

Architecture
- Architectural type: Church
- Style: Renaissance architecture
- Groundbreaking: 1352

Administration
- Diocese: Roman Catholic Archdiocese of Naples

Santa Maria di Piedigrotta is a Baroque-style church in Naples, Italy; it is located in the neighborhood or quartiere of Piedigrotta.

A church at the site was consecrated by 1353, and dedicated to the Birth of the Virgin. It was established at the site of an older chapel sheltering a wooden Byzantine icon of the Virgin dell'Itria (Odigitria). Legend holds the Virgin appeared to three individuals requesting the church to be built. In 1453, it was ceded to the Canons Regular of the Lateran, and it is still belongs to the order. It has undergone a number of restorations and reconstructions including 1520, 1820, and 1853. The present facade dates from 1853, and was designed by Errico Alvino, with sculptures by Bernardo Manco. The adjacent cloister was designed by Tommaso Malvito.

In the chapel of the Madonna di Pompei are a Crucifixion, and a Pietà with Anthony of Padua by Wenzel Cobergher. The next chapel has a Martyrdom of Agostino d'Ipponi by Giuseppe Mancinelli and a Marriage of Joseph and Mary by Bernardo Cavallino .

The church once held works by Hemsel, Francesco Santafede, Giovanni Bernardo Lama, Maerten de Vos, and Belisario Corenzio.

== Sources ==
- Ferrari, Giovanni Battista de; Vasi, Mariano (1826). Nuova guida di Napoli, dei contorni di Procida, Ischia e Capri, Compilata su la Guida del Vasi, Prima Edizione. Naples: Tipografia de Porcelli. p. 100.
- Portions derived from Italian Wikipedia entry.
