= Cesare Turco =

Italian painter

Cesare Turco (c. 1510—c. 1560) was an Italian painter of the Renaissance period. He was born in Ischitella near Foggia. He was a pupil of Giovanni Antonio d'Amato but afterwards studied under Andrea Sabbatini. He painted for the churches and public buildings of Naples. He painted the Baptism of Christ by St. John in Santa Maria delle Grazie presso le mura di Napoli and a Circumcision for the Jesuits' church. He also painted in Santa Maria la Nova and Sant'Agostino in Naples. Turco died in Naples.
