= Giovanni Antonio di Amato the younger =

Italian painter

Giovanni Antonio d'Amato the younger (il giovane) (c. 1535–1598) was an Italian painter of the Renaissance period, active mainly in his natal city of Naples.

Born to the brother of the painter Giovanni Antonio d'Amato il vecchio; he married the painter Mariangiola Criscuolo. Upon his uncle's death, he entered the studio of Giovanni Bernardo Lama, also his uncle's pupil. He had two daughters and one son.
