= Francesco Santafede =

Italian painter

Francesco Santafede (16th century) was an Italian painter of the Renaissance period, active mainly in Naples. He was the father of the painter Fabrizio Santafede, a pupil of Andrea Sabbatini (Andrea di Salerno). He was a colleague of Francesco Imparato, and like his son, emerged from the studio of Andrea Sabbatini, although he appears to have also followed the style of Giovanni Filippo Criscuolo.
