= Giovanni Vincenzo Corso =

Italian painter (c.1490–c.1545)

Giovanni Vincenzo Corso (c. 1490 – c. 1545) was an Italian painter of the Renaissance period. He was born in Naples. He was a pupil of Giovanni Antonio Amato and influenced by Pietro Perugino, Andrea Sabbatini, and Polidoro da Caravaggio, and subsequently went to Rome, where he assisted Perin del Vaga. Most of the works of this artist in the churches at Naples have been damaged and retouched. They include a Christ bearing his Cross for the church of San Domenico Maggiore, and an Adoration of the Magi for the church of San Lorenzo Maggiore. He died in Rome in 1545.
