= Santa Maria delle Grazie a Toledo =

Church building in Naples, Italy

Coordinates: 40.842672°N 14.248754°E

Santa Maria delle Grazie is a Roman Catholic church located on Via Toledo, near its intersection with Via Diaz Armando, in central Naples, Italy.

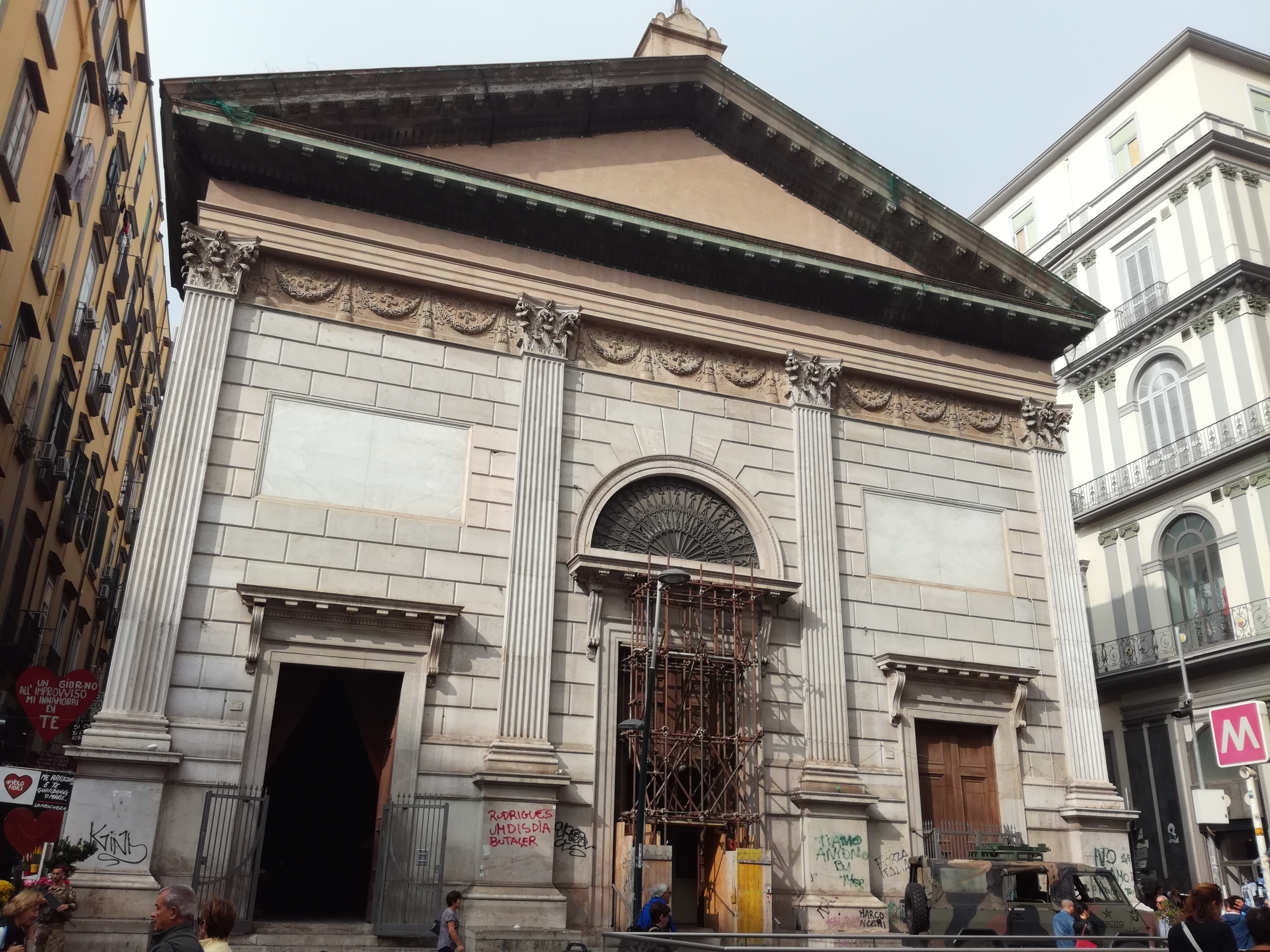
Façade

== History ==
The church was built in 1628 by the Theatine Order, and initially dedicated to the Virgin of Loreto. In 1721 there was a partial reconstruction. In 1806, the Theatines were suppressed and it acquired secular use. In 1835, the church was attached to the Confraternita dei sette dolori (Confraternity of seven pains), whose original home was the Basilica church of San Francesco di Paola. The reconstruction of the church in the time of Ferdinand II of Two Sicilies was designed by Carlo Parascaldo.

The main altar (1759) was completed by Giuseppe Sanmartino based on designs by Michelangelo Porzio. Beside the altar are two statues by Tito Angelini, representing Faith and Hope. Adding to the Neoclassic decor are paintings of San Gennaro by Tommaso de Vivo, San Gaetano by Camillo Guerra, and a Guardian Angel by Gennaro Maldarelli. The church in 2009, was reopened to public despite ongoing restorations.

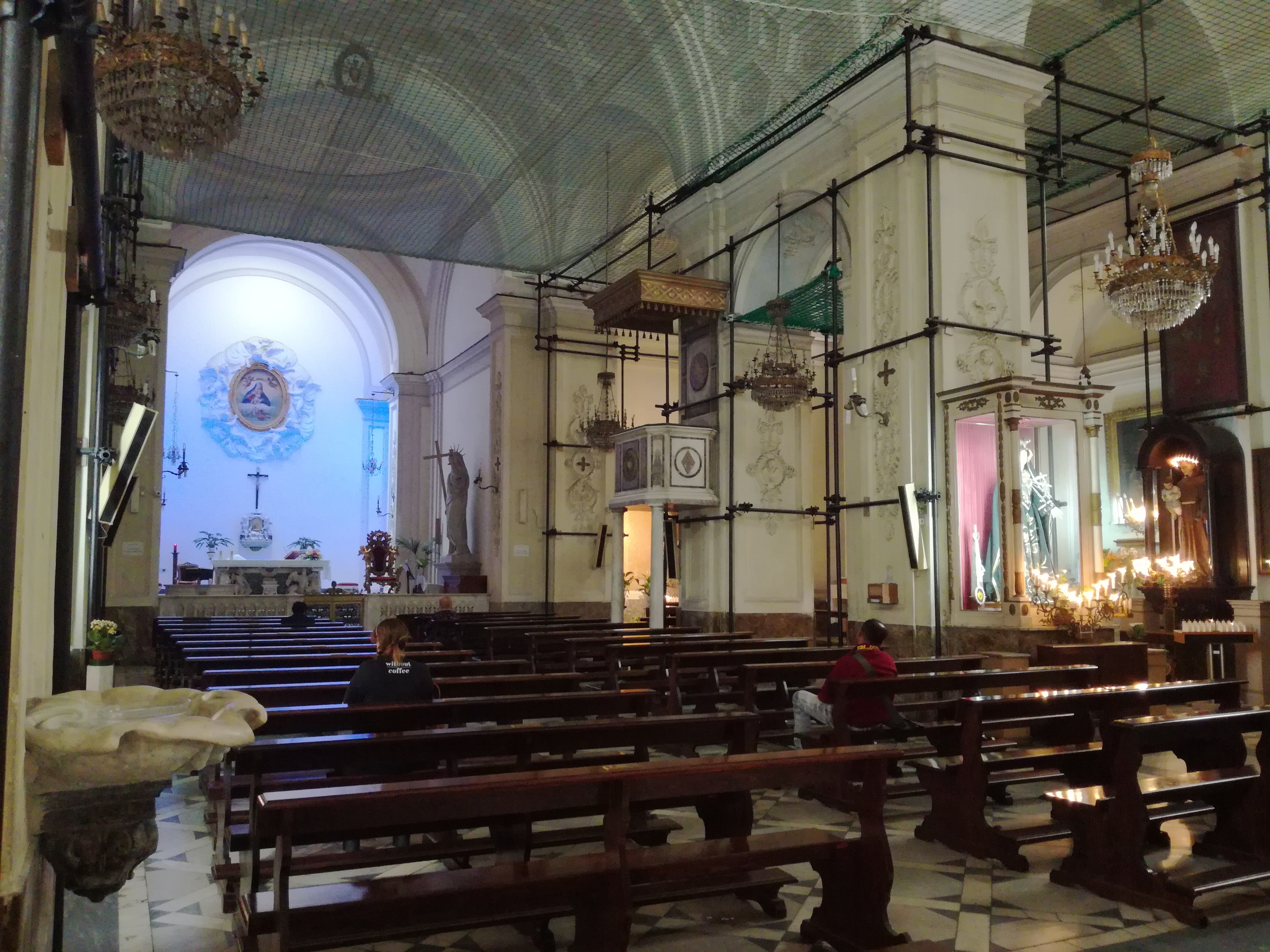
Interior

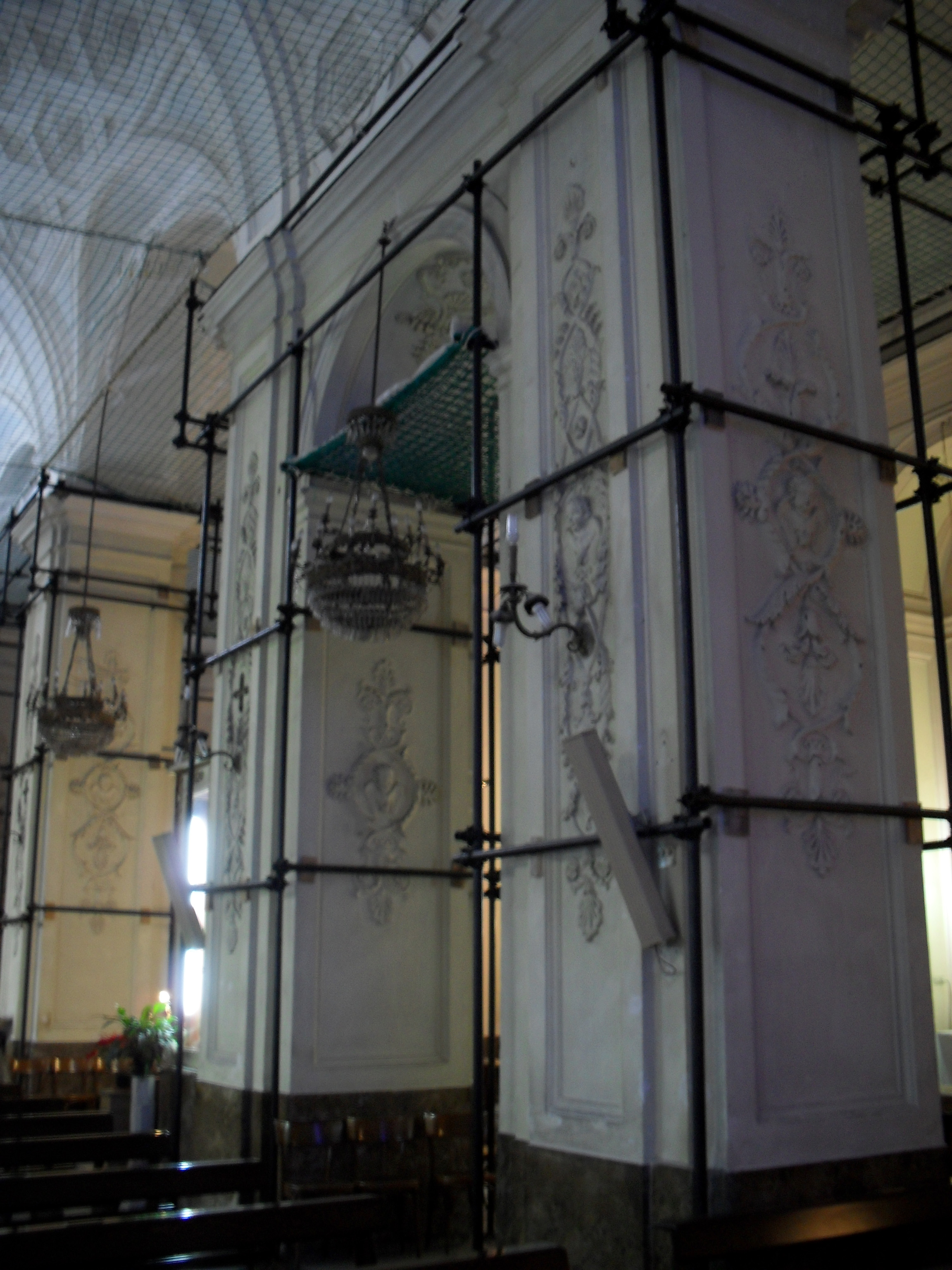
Detail of Interior

== Bibliography ==
- Antonio Terraciano, Andrea Russo, Le chiese di Napoli. Censimento e brevi recensioni delle 448 chiese storiche della città di Napoli, Lorenzo Giunta Editor, 1999.
