= Palazzo Fani Mignanelli =

Gothic-style building in Siena, Italy

Coordinates: 43.3195°N 11.3312°E

The Palazzo Fani Mignanelli is a Gothic-style building, located on via Banchi di Sopra in the city of Siena, region of Tuscany, Italy.

== History ==
The palace was used as a meeting place for the town councils before the Palazzo Pubblico was built. It is described as a Castellare or castle-house. Built in the 14th century with at least three medieval towers. The façade in Roman brick has four arcades with pointed gothic arches. The towers are now incorporated into the palace. The façade has medieval plaques representing various Terzi of the citi. The guide by Romagnoli claimed the palace had frescoes by Beccafumi, but later critics attribute the frescoes depicting the sacrifice of a girl (either the daughter of Jephthah or else the daughter of Agamemnon, Iphigenia) to Marco Pino.

The palace houses a variety of occupants and business, including a boutique hotel.
