= Giuseppe Mastroleo =

Italian painter

Giuseppe Mastroleo (died in Naples, 1744) was an Italian painter.

== Biography ==
He was a pupil of Paolo De Matteis. He painted a St Erasmus for the church of Santa Maria la Nuova in Naples. He also painted for the Nunziatella of Pizzofalcone. One of his pupils was Josef Lujan Martinez from Zaragoza.
