= Giovanni Bernardo Lama =

Italian painter

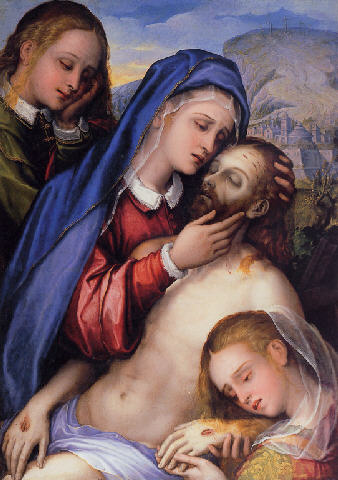
Giovanni Bernardo Lama, Pieta, oil on panel, 107.3 x 76.2 cm

Giovanni Bernardo Lama (1508–1579) was an Italian painter of the Renaissance period, active mainly in Naples. He was the son of a generally unknown artist, Matteo Lama. He was the apprentice of Giovanni Antonio D’Amato, then Polidoro da Caravaggio who had fled Rome after the Sack of 1527. He worked in the style of his friend and contemporary Andrea di Salerno. A Madonna and child with saints is in the sacristy of San Luca Evangelista in Praiano. A Deposition from the Cross is found in the Royal Basilica of San Giacomo Spagnoli in Naples.

Among other works in and around Naples are a Crucifixion and a Deposition for Santa Maria delle Grazie, the main altarpiece in Sant'Andrea, and stucco work in the church of the Annunziata, and a Transfiguration for the church of the town of San Marcellino, and a Martyrdom of St Stephen for the church of San Lorenzo. His disciples were Silvestro Bruno, Bernardo Pompeo and Cavaliere Pompeo Landulfo, who had his daughter in marriage.
