= Pompeo Landulfo =

Italian painter

Pompeo Landulfo (after 1567–1627) was an Italian painter active mainly in Naples. He was born in Maddaloni near Caserta, Italy.

== Biography ==
He was a pupil or follower of Giovanni Bernardo Lama, and appears to have worked under Silvestro Buono. He may have collaborated with Buono in his Annunciation at Piano di Sorrento or other works. Under Lama, he may have worked on the Christ among the Doctors found at National Museum of Capodimonte, and a painting of the Pentecost found in Spirito Santo in Sant'Antimo. To Landulfo alone is attributed the painting of Madonna with Saints John the Baptist and Domenic found in San Lorenzo Maggiore of Naples, and the Nativity paintings found in San Gregorio Armeno and San Paolo Maggiore. In 1592, he painted an Annunciation, once attributed to Lama, for the church of the Santissimo Corpo di Cristo di Maddaloni. He painted an Adoration of the Magi (1595) for San Pietro ad Aram. In 1598, he painted a Marriage of the Virgin with Lama for Ss. Corpo de Cristo. That same year, he also painted a Enthroned Madonna with San Martino and Santa Fede as well as a St Aniello with Saints Peter and Biagio, now found in Ss. Corpo de Cristo. For the latter church he would later paint a Last Supper, a Christ carrying the Cross, a Maddonna dell'Arco, and a Madonna del Carmine with St Catherine.

He painted an altar-piece for the church of San Matteo at Naples, representing the Virgin with the Infant Jesus in clouds surrounded by angels. He afterwards painted a Holy Family with Saints Francis, Catharine, & Lucia for the church of La Pieta. He painted an Angels crowning St Catherine of Siena in the Capodimonte Museum. He died in Naples.
