= Francesco Curia =

Italian painter

Francesco Curia (c. 1538–1610) was an Italian painter of the Renaissance period, active mainly in his hometown of Naples. He was the son of the painter Michele Curia. He was a pupil of the painter Giovanni Filippo Criscuolo. Among his pupils were Fabrizio Santafede and Ippolito Borghese.

He was one of several artists residing in Naples that were influenced by the style of Giorgio Vasari.
