= Baptism of Christ (Caracciolo) =

1610–1615 painting by Battistello Caracciolo

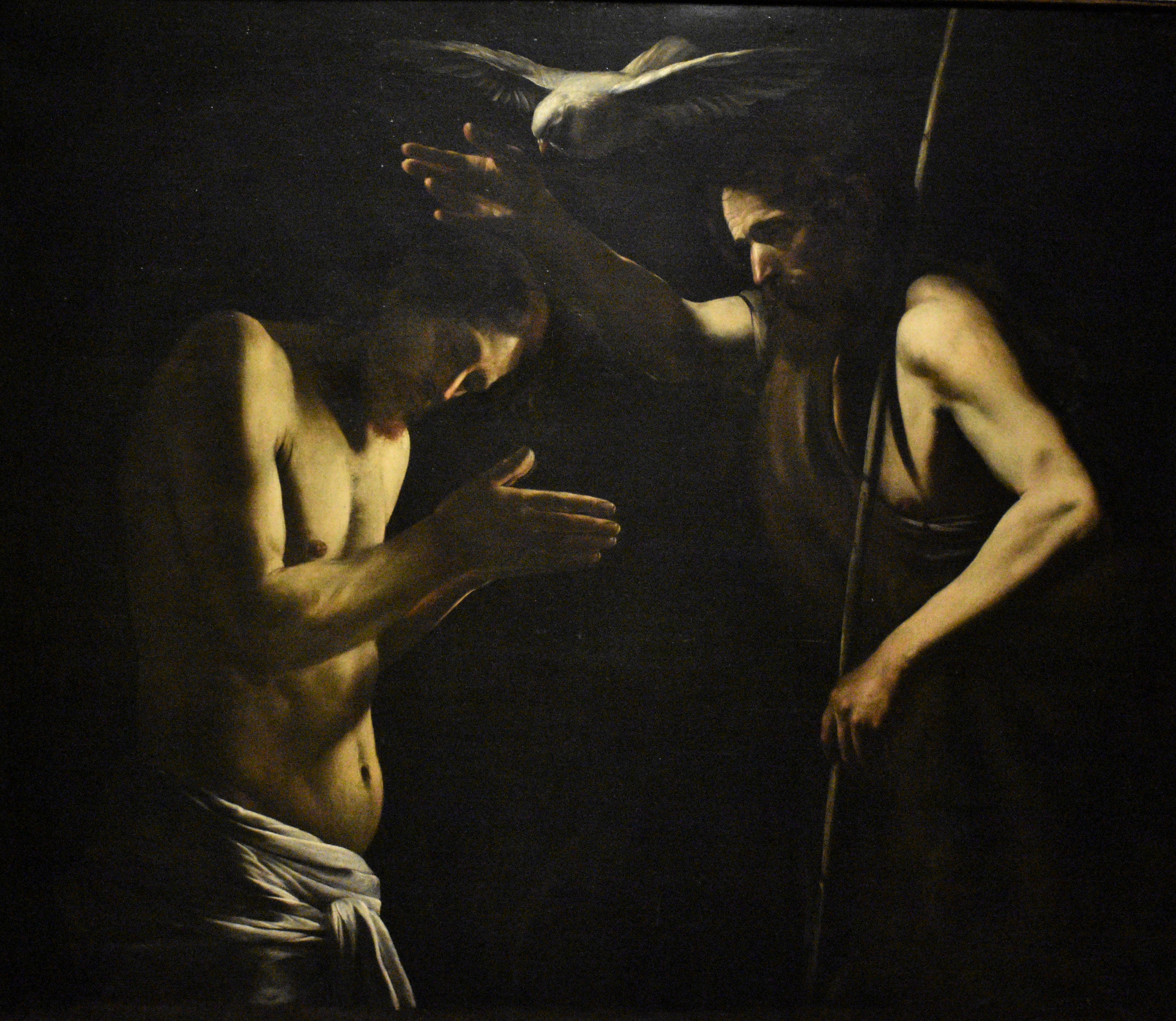

Baptism of Christ is a 1610-1615 oil on canvas painting by Battistello Caracciolo, now in the Girolamini, Naples.

== History ==
The first written reference to the work is by Carlo Celano, who mentions it as already being in the Girolamini, It had very probably arrived there as part of Domenico Lercaro's art collection, bequeathed to the Oratorians in 1623.

== Bibliography (in Italian) ==
- Stefano Causa, Battistello, in the exhibition catalogue Battistello Caracciolo e il primo naturalismo a Napoli, edited by Ferdinando Bologna, Napoli 1991.
- P. Leone de Castris e R. Middione La quadreria dei Girolamini, Napoli 1986.
- Nicola Spinosa, Pittura del Seicento a Napoli – da Caravaggio a Massimo Stanzione, Napoli, Arte'm, 2008.
- Raffaele Traettino, Il Battesimo di Cristo, in Il racconto del cielo – Capolavori dei Girolamini a Lecce, Artem, Napoli 2013.
