= Francesco Imparato =

Italian painter

Francesco Imparato (c. 1520—1570) was an Italian painter of the Renaissance period, active mainly in his city of birth, Naples.

Father of Girolamo Imparato. He trained under Giovanni Filippo Criscuolo, where he became a close friend and fellow-pupil of Fabrizio Santafede. He became a follower of Andrea Sabbatini (di Salerno).
