= Madonna of the Souls in Purgatory =

Painting by Battistello Caracciolo

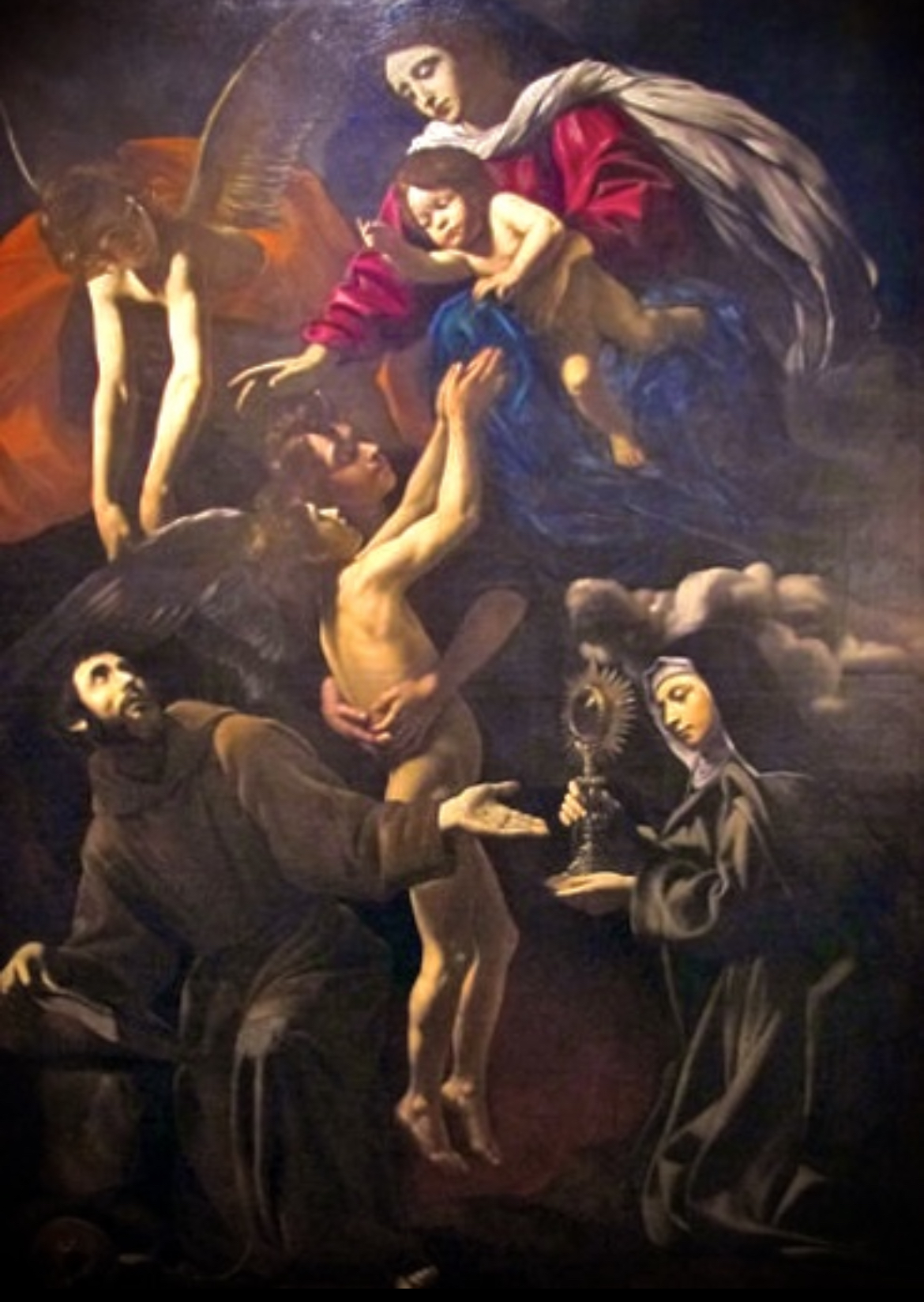

Madonna of the Souls in Purgatory is a 1622–1625 oil on canvas painting by Battistello Caracciolo, originally in the church of Santa Chiara in Nola but was moved out of the church after its roof collapsed in the 1980 Irpinia earthquake and into the Museo nazionale di Capodimonte in Naples, where it still hangs.
