= Piedigrotta =

Coordinates: 40°49′50″N 14°13′11″E

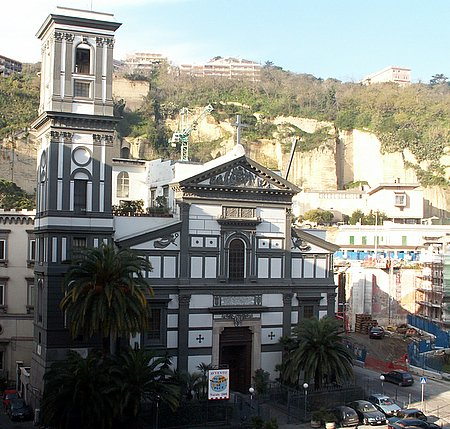
Church of the Madonna di Piedigrotta

Piedigrotta (Italian: [ˌpjɛdiˈɡrɔtta]; Neapolitan: Piererotta [ˌpjereˈrottə]; lit. "at the foot of the grotto") is a section of the Chiaia quarter of Naples, Italy, so-called for the presence of the Church of the Madonna of Piedigrotta near the entrance to the Crypta Neapolitana. The area was also well known for an annual festival, which gave rise to a song writing competition leading to the commercial birth of the popular Neapolitan song.
