= Uriele Vitolo =

Uriele Vitolo (14 January 1831 - unknown) was an Italian sculptor.

== Biography ==
He was born in Avellino, Italy. He completed his first studies in design and modelling at the Academy of Fine Arts of Naples, earning a scholarship of his province; he joined the studio of Gennaro Cali and was given advice by Antonio Cali. He won medals at public expositions of Naples for 1861, 1863, 1869, 1871, and 1874, he had five medals of honor, of which four were silver, and one gold. In 1861, he was awarded another award in a public competition offered by the king for the design of a monument to Italian national unity.

Vitolo generated much competitive enmity from the Neapolitan sculptor Tito Angelini. Vitolo was able to obtain commissions from afar, including Russia, London, Ireland, Tunisia, Corfù, and Romania. These included the larger than life statue of Stefan the Great, made for Wallachia (present day Romania). Among his other works are statue of Wounded Diomedes; La riconoscenza; A martyr of the first Crusade; Risen Christ; Kiss of Judas, Narcisus at the fountain; The Prodigal Son; Christ sleeping; the large monument to Giovanni da Procida given by the city of Salerno. He sculpted various portraits; including of Lincoln, Humboldt, Manzoni, and Alessandro Volta, and at the Cemetery of Naples, on the tomb of a child of the Roccaromana family: an Angel who carries a Baby to Heaven. Vitolo was a member and honorary professor of a number of artistic societies, among them the Royal Institute of Fine Arts of Naples. He has been awarded three gold medals: one from the Scientific Academy of Smyrna, one from the Byzantine Academy of Constantinople, and finally a third from the Circulo Partenopeo Giambattista Vico of Naples. By decree in 1878, the Bey di Tunisia awarded him the Order of Niscian Iflikhau.
