= Giovanni Antonio Amato =

Italian painter (c.1475–1555)

- Born: Giovanni Antonio Amato c. 1475; Naples, Kingdom of Naples
- Died: 1555
- Other name: il Vecchio
- Occupation: Renaissance painter

Giovanni Antonio Amato or Amati (c. 1475–1555) was an Italian painter of the Renaissance period. Born in Naples, he copied the style of Pietro Perugino.

He was also called il Vecchio. He followed the style of Pietro Perugino, and among his pupils were Giovanni Vincenzo Corso, Giovanni Bernardo Lama, Battista Loca, Pietro Negroni, Simone il Giovane Papa, and Cesare Turco. His nephew, Giovanni Antonio di Amato the younger, married the painter Mariangiola Criscuolo.

Another painter named Giovanni Antonio D’Amato was active in Baroque Naples. He painted a Vergine Lauretana for the church of Santa Maria del Popolo agli Incurabili and the Vision of San Romualdo for the ceiling of the choir of the Eremo dei Camaldoli. He painted a Santi Nicola, Domenico e Gennaro, now in the museo civico. He also painted a Deposition and the Holy Family in the church of the Gerolamini. The relationship between these two painters is unclear.

== Sources ==
- Ticozzi, Stefano (1830). Dizionario degli architetti, scultori, pittori, intagliatori in rame ed in pietra, coniatori di medaglie, musaicisti, niellatori, intarsiatori d'ogni etá e d'ogni nazione' (Volume 1). Milan: Gaetano Schiepatti. p. 46.
- Hobbes, James R. (1849). Picture collector's manual adapted to the professional man, and the amateur. London: T&W Boone. p. 5.
