= Mariangiola Criscuolo =

Italian artist (c. 1548–1630)

- Born: c. 1548; Naples, Italy
- Died: 1630 (aged 81–82)
- Known for: Painting
- Spouse: Giovanni Antonio d’Amato

Mariangiola Criscuolo (c. 1548–1630) was an Italian painter of the Renaissance period, active mainly in her native city of Naples. She is known for portraiture and history painting, and excelled in painting altarpieces. She was also involved in the foundation of one of the first female-organized schools of art during the sixteenth century.

Born to painter Giovanni Filippo Criscuolo (died 1624); her uncle, Giovanni Angelo (Gian Angelo) was also a painter. She married the painter Giovanni Antonio di Amato the younger.

== Early life and education ==
Mariangiola Criscuolo was born c. 1548 in Naples, Italy. She was exposed to art at a young age as members of her family were already established Neapolitan artists. Her uncle, Giovanni Angelo Criscuolo (c. 1500 – after 1577 Naples), was originally a notary that later became a painter. Her father, Giovanni Filippo Criscuolo (c. 1529 – 1561), was also an artist in Naples, whose style was similar to followers of Raphael. The similarities in style in Mariangela’s work with that of her father makes him a probable source of her informal training in becoming a painter. Those similarities in style are more clearly illustrated in Giovanni Filippo’s Annunciation for San Paolo Maggiore in Naples and Mariangela’s depiction of the same scene for the parocchiale di Bucciano in Benevento.

== Career ==
Mariangiola worked to become a prominent female portraitist before being married to another artist, Giovanni Antonio d’Amato (1535–1598). Later in her career, she turned to history painting, depicting many religious scenes, such as the Death of the Virgin and an altarpiece of the Virgin and Child with Saints. Another well known work by Mariangela is the Deposition from the Cross found in the church of San Servino in Naples. While still married to her husband, Mariangela also ran possibly the earliest documented female-organized informal school of art in Naples. She taught both female and male students. Few of her male pupils reached great acclaim as it was perceived to be less impressive to learn from a female teacher. One of her suspected female pupils was Luisa Capomazza, who went on to take vows as a nun and paint for various churches in Naples.

== Death ==
Mariangela’s date of death is unknown, but it is suspected that she died after 1598, when her husband died.

== Biography in Vite de’ Pittori, Scultori ed Architetti Napoletani ==
Much of what is known about Mariangela Criscuolo is based on the biography written by Bernardo de Dominici (1683–1759) in his book, Vite de’ Pittori, Scultori ed Architetti Napoletani (Lives of the Neapolitan Painters, Sculptors, and Architects), published in Naples in three volumes between 1742 and 1745. In his biography of Mariangela, de Dominici references the unpublished compilation of Neapolitan artist biographies by Massimo Stanzione. De Dominici acknowledges Mariangela’s accomplishments as an artist and founder of an art school accepting both men and women. Adding to this, de Dominici also states that women were sent to her more to learn how to be good wives and Christians rather than good artists.

== Bibliography ==
- De Dominici, Bernardo (1742). Vite dei Pittori, Scultori, ed Architetti Napolitani. Vol. 2. Naples: Stamperia del Ricciardi. pp. 347–350.
- Minieri-Riccio, Camillo (1844). Memorie storiche degli scrittori nati nel regno di Napoli. Naples: Tipografia dell'Aquila di V. Puzziello, Chiostro di San Tomasso d'Aquino. p. 111.
