= Giovanni Do =

Italian painter

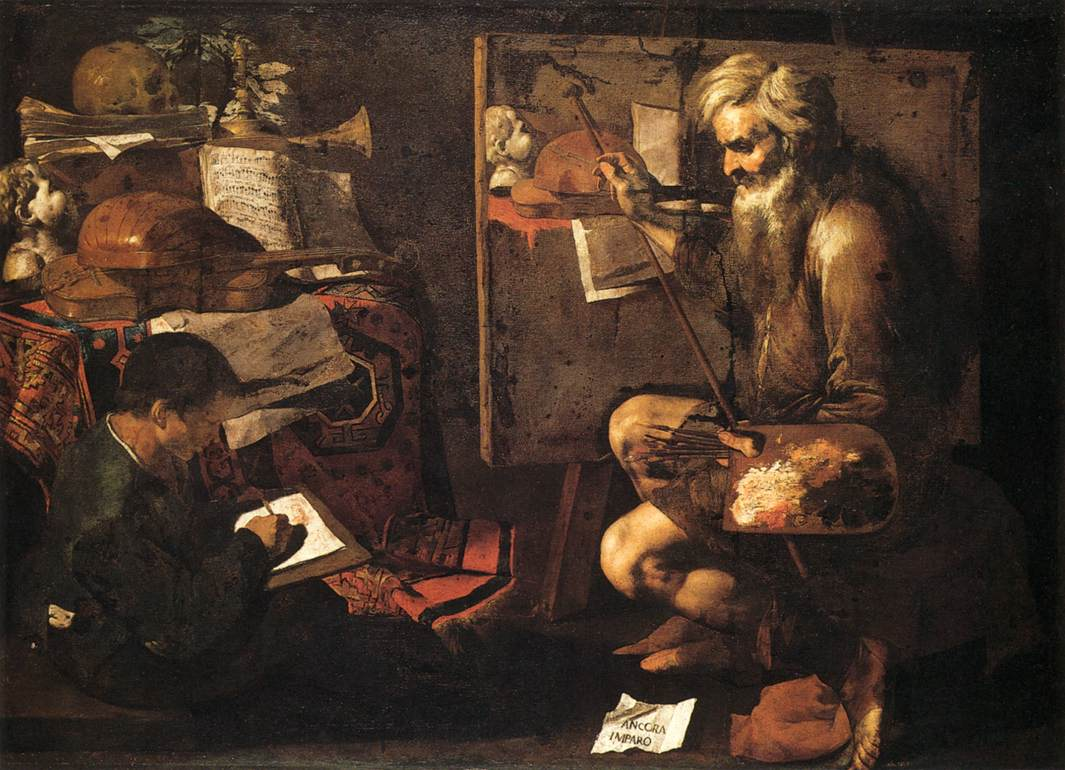
The Painter's Studio, Private collection

Giovanni Do (before 1617 – ?1656) was a Spanish painter, active in Naples.

He was born in the town of Xàtiva, near Valencia in Spain. By 1626, Giovanni Do was in Naples, and that year he married Grazia, sister of Pacecco De Rosa; the marriage contract describes him as Spanish and states the painters Giovanni Battista Caracciolo and fellow Spaniard Jusepe de Ribera as witnesses. His only masterpiece, and firm attribution, is his gloom-stricken tenebrist ‘'Adoration of shepherds'’ for the Church of Pietà dei Turchini in Naples. The Real Academia de Bellas Artes de San Fernando in Madrid owns a beautiful Adoration of the Shepherds proved to be a versión of an unpublished original by Ribera, of similar measures, was discovered that in 2012 appeared on the Art market.
