= José Luzán =

Spanish painter

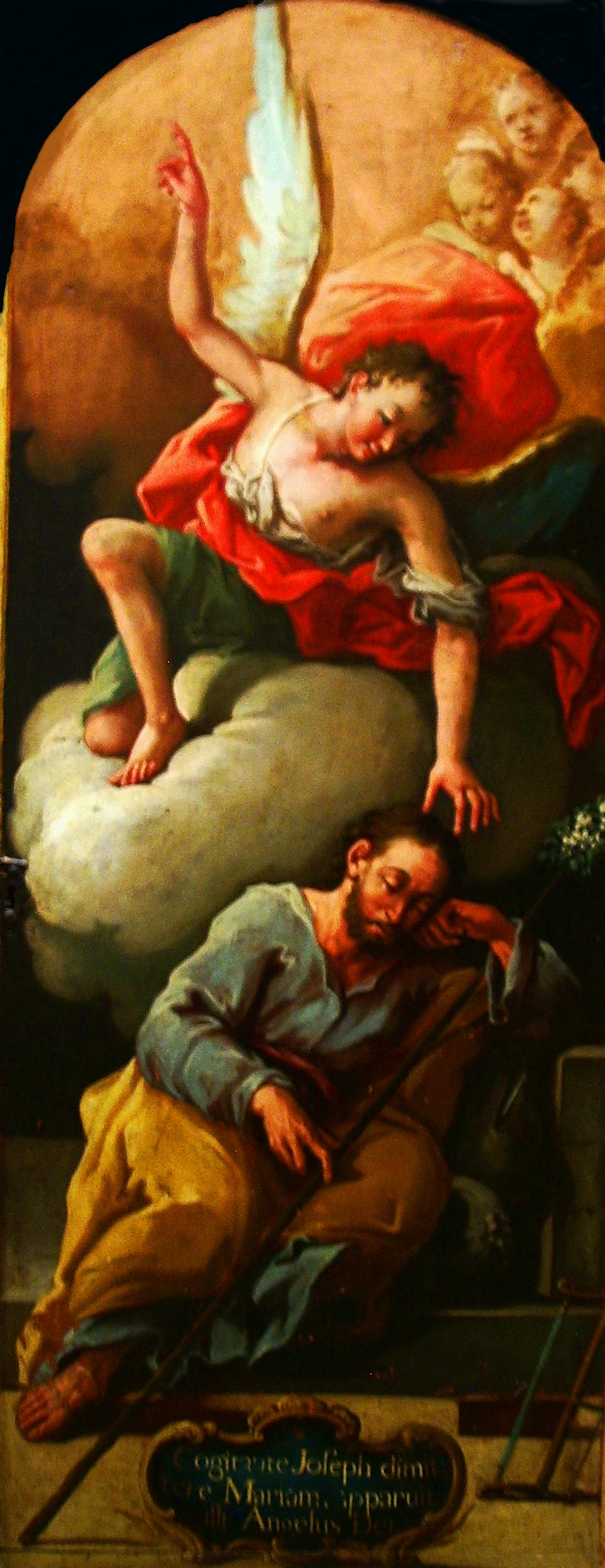
Dream of Joseph by José Luzán

José Luzán (1710 – 1785), also José Luzán y Martínez, was a Spanish Baroque painter.

Son of the painter and gilder of retablos Juan Luzán, Luzán married Teresa, daughter of John Zabalo, who was also a painter and designer of altarpieces.

Thanks to the patronage of the Pignatelli family, Luzán studied in Naples, where he met the Italian Baroque master Giuseppe Mastroleo. He returned to Zaragoza around 1730 to establish an academy, which enjoyed great success. He was named reviewer of paintings by the Spanish Inquisition and in 1741 was appointed by Philip V of Spain as supernumerary painter of the Royal House. The study of the rich collections of the palace allowed him to considerably refine his style. Following on from the gloomy tone of his early works, he acquired a taste for warm colouring, dominating with the yellow, ochre and red in his palette, and lightened the burden of his brushstrokes. In the 1760s, he executed large works and bold compositions, which made clear his status as one of the most gifted eighteenth-century painters of religious subjects.

Luzán enjoyed much prestige as a teacher and author. Among his disciples were Francisco Bayeu y Subías, and Francisco Goya.

Luzán left Madrid to direct the Academy of Painting and Sculpture in Zaragoza, if only briefly, as the institution went through severe financial difficulties and had to close. He managed to see it reopened in 1784, but his health would no longer allow him to teach. He died in his hometown shortly thereafter in 1785.

== External links and references ==
- Lorente, Stephen, "The Chapel of San Marco and the Easter Memorial Cathedral of Saragossa", Journal of Research of the College of Logroño, t. II, 1976, p. 97-103.
- Ramirez Family in the Great Aragon Encyclopedia (Spanish)

Citations
