= Gennaro Calì =

Gennaro Calì (c. 1799–1877) was an Italian sculptor.

== Biography ==
He was born and died in Naples. He was born in a family of artists. His brother Antonio was also a sculptor. He studied initially at the Royal Academy of Fine Arts of Naples, then moved to Rome, where he worked under the Neoclassical sculptor Bertel Thorvaldsen, and also encountered Antonio Canova. Returning to Naples, he helped decorate the entrance stairway to the Royal Palace. He also helped complete the gilded stucco decoration of the throne room of the Royal Palace of Caserta.

In Naples, he also sculpted the statue of San Giovanni Crisostomo for the church of San Francesco di Paola, a Pietà for the main altar for the church of the Camposanto, and L’Addolorata now in the Museo di Capodimonte.

An article in 1856 Journal of Il Poligrafo, describes him as the prince of Neapolitan sculptors In 1822, along with Tito Angelini, he won an award for sculpture from the Institute of Fine Arts of Naples. In 1835, he is described as an honorary professor at the Royal Institute of Fine Arts in Naples.

Among his pupils was Uriele Vitolo.
