= Raimondo Epifanio =

Italian painter

Raimondo Epifanio (1440–1482) was an Italian painter of the Renaissance period. Born in Naples. He studied under Silvestro Buono. One of his pupils was Andrea Sabbatini.

== Sources ==
- Hobbes, James R. (1849). Picture collector's manual adapted to the professional man, and the amateur. London: T&W Boone. p. 82.
