= Costalpino =

- Frazione
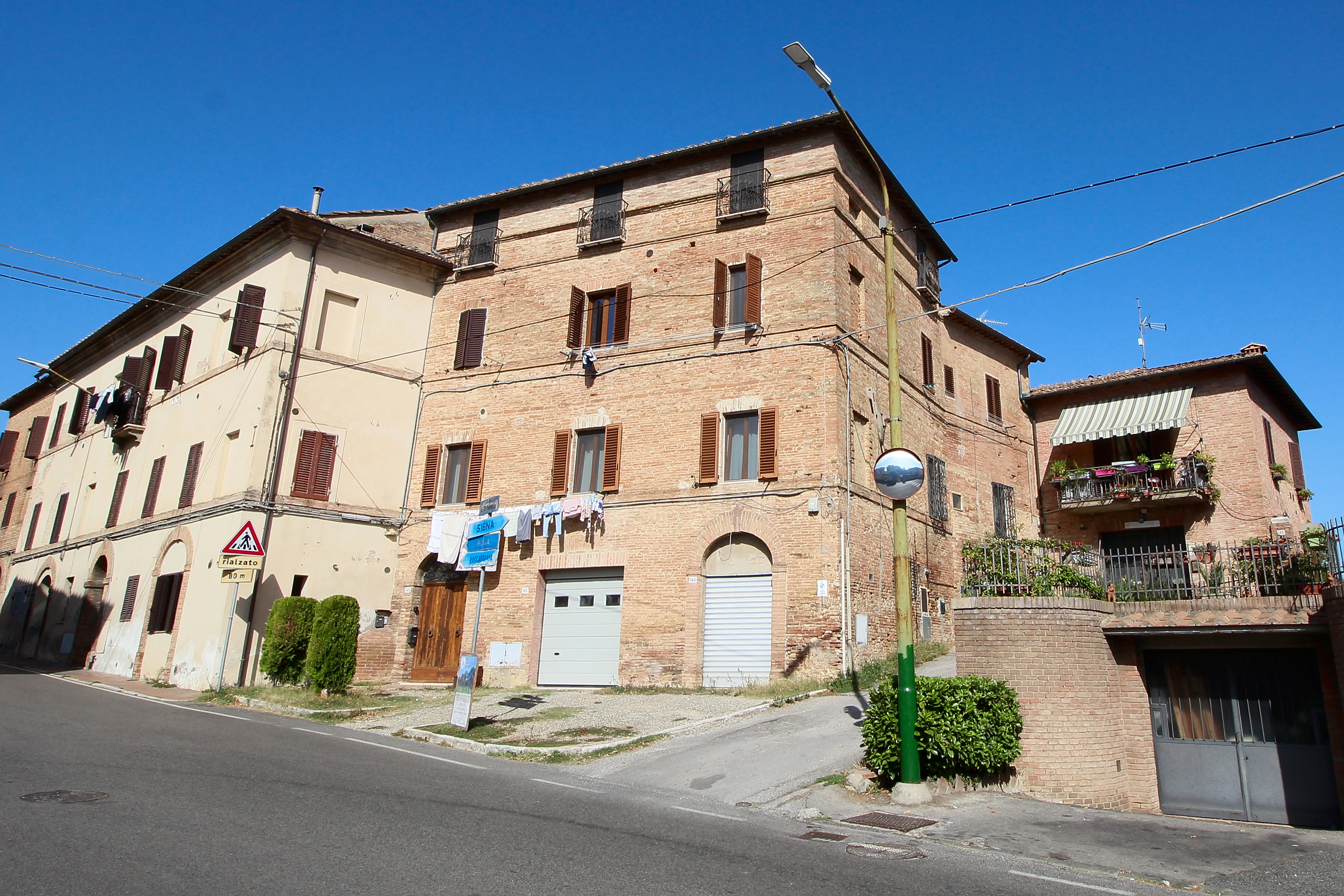

- Location of Costalpino in Italy
- Coordinates: 43°17′30″N 11°18′15″E
- Country: Italy
- Region: Tuscany
- Province: Siena (SI)
- Comune: Siena
- Elevation: 270 m (890 ft)
- Time zone: UTC+1 (CET)
  - Summer (DST): UTC+2 (CEST)

Costalpino is a village in Tuscany, central Italy, in the comune of Siena, province of Siena.

It is located about 5 km south-west of Siena. Renaissance painter Marco Pino was born in Costalpino in 1521.

== Bibliography ==
- Emanuele Repetti (1841). "Costalpino". Dizionario geografico fisico storico della Toscana. Vol. 4. Florence. pp. 266–267.
