= Tommaso De Vivo =

Italian painter

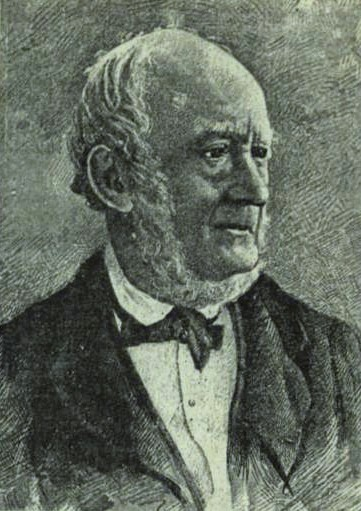
Tommaso De Vivo

Tommaso De Vivo (1787–1884) was an Italian painter, active mainly in Naples, Italy. He painted mostly historical and religious subjects.

He studied at the Accademia di Belli Arti of Naples, and followed the style of Vincenzo Camuccini. He painted a Death of Abel for the Palace of Capodimonte, and won a prize in 1851 for his painting of Rape of the Venetian Brides. He painted an altarpiece with Death of St. Andrea da Avellino for the church of San Francesco di Paola. He published a series of colored engravings about the history of Naples: I fasti della storia napolitana. Tavole all'acqua forte inventate ed incise dal cavaliere Tommaso De Vivo.
