= Girolamo Imparato =

Italian painter

Girolamo Imparato (1550–1607) was an Italian painter working in a late-Renaissance or Mannerist style, active mainly in Naples. His father, the painter Francesco Imparato, was a colleague of Francesco Santafede.
