= San Francesco di Paola, Naples =

Roman Catholic church in Naples

Basilica of San Francesco di Paola Basilica di San Francesco di Paola (in Italian)
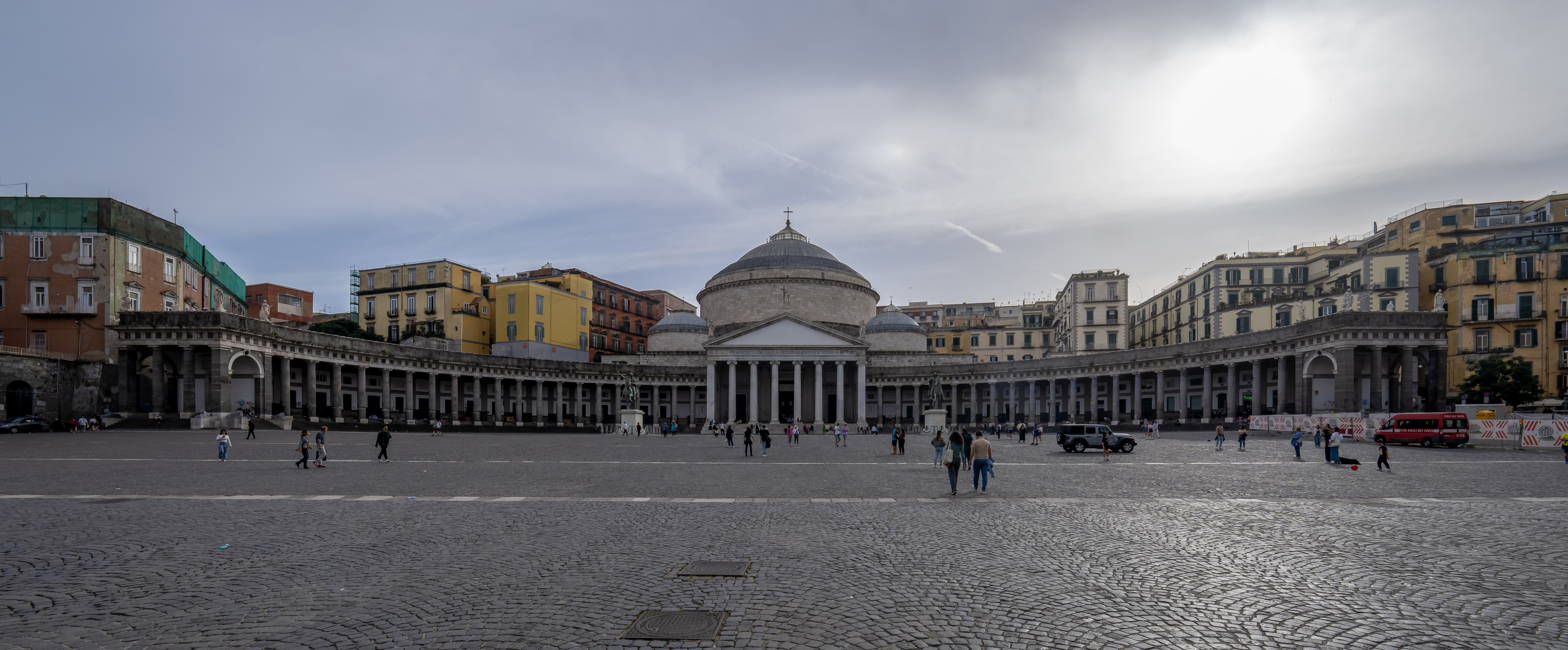
- The church of San Francesco di Paola

Religion
- Affiliation: Roman Catholic
- Diocese: Archdiocese of Naples
- Ecclesiastical or organizational status: Minor basilica

Location
- Location: Naples, Campania, Italy
- Interactive map of Basilica of San Francesco di Paola; Basilica di San Francesco di Paola (in Italian)
- Coordinates: 40.835296°N 14.247471°E

Architecture
- Type: Church
- Style: Neoclassical
- Height (max): 54 m

San Francesco di Paola is a prominent church located to the west in Piazza del Plebiscito, the main square of Naples, Italy. The construction started in 1816 and ended in 1846.

In the early 19th century, King Joachim Murat of Naples (Napoleon's brother-in-law) planned the entire square and the large building with the colonnades as a tribute to the emperor. When Napoleon was finally dispatched, the Bourbons were restored to the throne of Naples. Ferdinand I continued the construction - finished in 1846 - but converted the final product into the church one sees today. He dedicated it to Saint Francis of Paola, who had stayed in a monastery on this site in the 16th century.

The church is reminiscent of the Pantheon in Rome. The façade is fronted by a portico resting on six columns and two Ionic pillars. Inside, the church is circular with two side chapels. The dome is 53 metres (174 ft) high. The portico is by Neapolitan architect Leopoldo Laperuta, while the main building is by the Swiss architect Pietro Bianchi.

== Interior ==
The interior has a number of statues: a San Giovanni Crisostomo by Gennaro Calì, Sant'Ambrogio by Tito Angelini, St Luke by Antonio Calì, a St Matthew by Carlo Finelli, a St John Evangelist by Pietro Tenerani, St Mark by Giuseppe de Fabris, a Sant'Agostino by Tommaso Arnaud, and a Sant'Attanasio by Angelo Solani.

In the chapels on the right, we find the following altarpieces: San Nicola da Tolentino and St Francis of Paola receives a stem of charity from an Angel, by Nicola Carta, Final Communion of San Ferdinando di Castiglia by Pietro Benvenuti, a Transit di St Joseph by Camillo Gerra, the Immaculate Conception and the death of Sant'Andrea Avellino by Tommaso de Vivo.

Before the main altar, is a 1641 work by Anselmo Cangiano, transferred here in 1835, from the church of the Santi Apostoli. In the apse is a painting of St Francis of Paola resuscitates a dead man by Vincenzo Camuccini. In the sacristy is an Immaculate Conception by Gaspare Landi and a Circumcision of Jesus by Antonio Campi
