= Bernadette DiPino =

American law enforcement officer

Bernadette DiPino is an American law enforcement officer who was formerly the Chief of Police in Sarasota, Florida. DiPino is the first woman to hold the position of chief of police of the Sarasota Police Department. Previously DiPino held the position of chief of police in Ocean City, Maryland from 2003 until 2009. DiPino is known for speaking out about sexual misconduct by police officers while on the job.

== Early life and education ==
DiPino was born into a family of law enforcement officers. She earned a Bachelor of Art’s Degree from Salisbury State University in 1995, and then later graduated from the FBI National Academy in 2001.

== Law enforcement career ==
DiPino began her career in law enforcement in 1985 with the Baltimore County Police Department. She relocated to Ocean City, Maryland in 1988 where she rose through the ranks to become the first woman to be Chief of Police in 2003. After 24 years in Ocean City, DiPino accepted the position as Chief of Police in Sarasota, Florida.
