= Giovanni Angelo Criscuolo =

Italian painter (1500–1573)

Giovanni Angelo Criscuolo (also known as Gian Angelo Criscuolo) (Cosenza, 1500–1573) was an Italian painter active mainly in Naples.

== Biography ==
He was the younger brother of the painter Giovanni Filippo Criscuolo. Although he showed an early inclination for art, his father would not permit him to make it his profession, but obliged him to follow the business of a notary. On the death of his father, the reputation his brother had acquired induced him to abandon his occupation, and place himself under the tuition of Marco di Pino da Siena, by whose instruction he became a reputable artist. Dominici describes many of his works in the churches at Naples, among which is an altar-piece in the church of San Stefano, representing the 'Martyrdom of St. Stephen'; in Monte Calvario, a picture of the 'Virgin and Infant, with St. Jerome,' dated 1572; in Santi Severino e Sossio, an 'Annunciation;' and in San Giacomo degli Spagnoli, an 'Assumption of the Virgin.' He wrote a History of the Neapolitan Artists to 1569. The exact date of his death is not known; some say about 1580.
