= Giovanni Previtali =

Italian art historian (1934–1988)

Giovanni Previtali (4 March 1934, in Florence – 3 February 1988, in Rome) was an Italian art historian, specialising in medieval Italian painters, sculptors, and architects. He studied under Lionello Venturi at the Sapienza University of Rome and under Roberto Longhi at the University of Florence. His personal archives are at the University of Siena.
