= Giovanni Filippo Criscuolo =

Italian painter

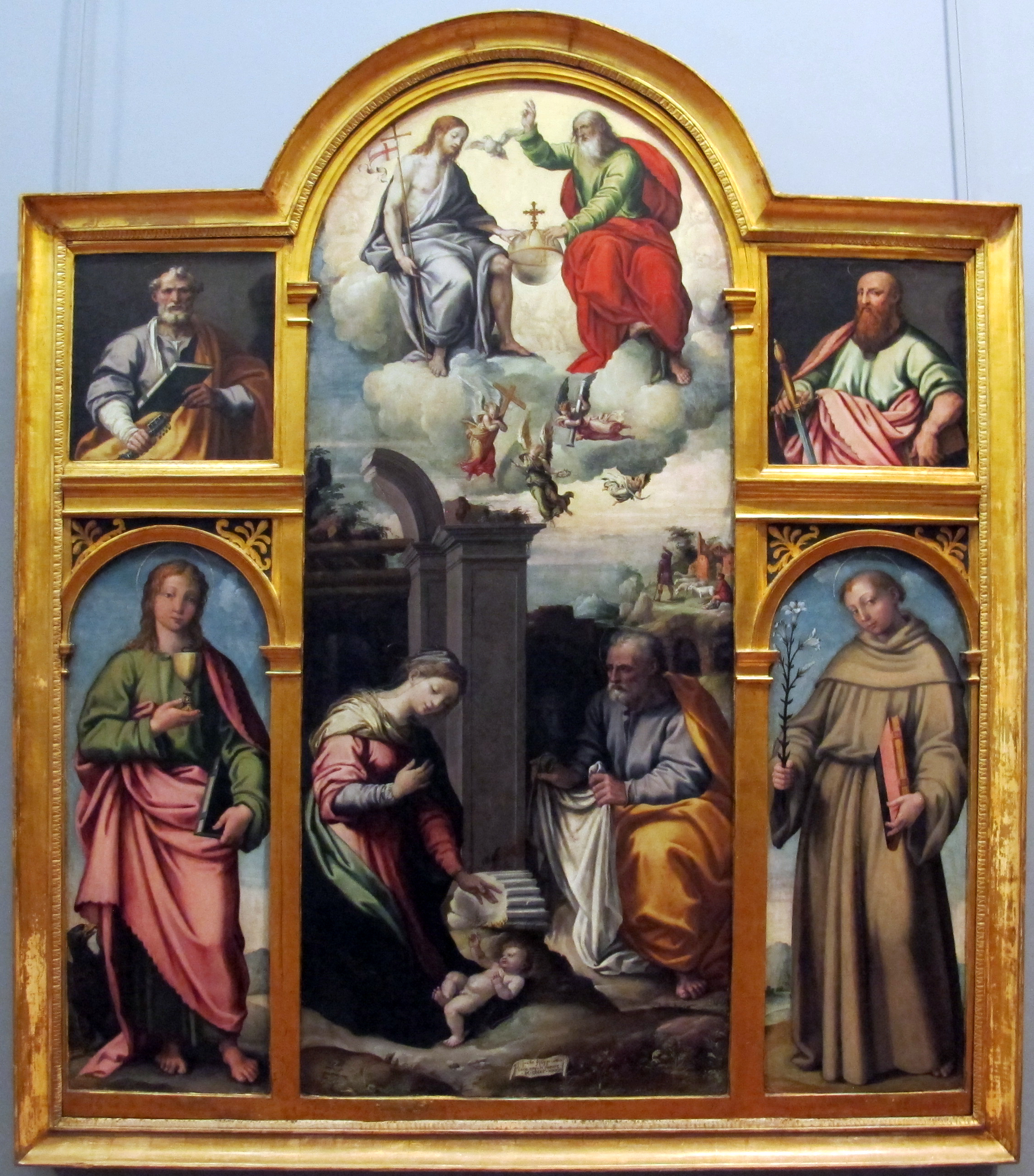
Polyptych in the Capodimonte Museum (1545)

Giovanni Filippo Criscuolo (c. 1500–1584) was an Italian painter, active during the late-Renaissance period, mainly in Naples.

Born in Gaeta, He trained with Andrea da Salerno and with Perino del Vaga in Rome. His brother Giovanni Angelico and daughter Mariangiola were also painters. He apparently wrote a series of biographies of Neapolitan painters. In Naples, he painted a Adoration of the Magi in Santa Maria del Rosario. In Santa Maria delle Grazie, he painted a Madonna and Child. In San Lorenzo, he painted a Christ bearing his Cross. He also left paintings in Gaeta. One of his pupils was Francesco Curia. His brother, Gian Angelo, (Cosenza, 1500–1573) was also a painter.
