= Marco Pino =

Italian painter

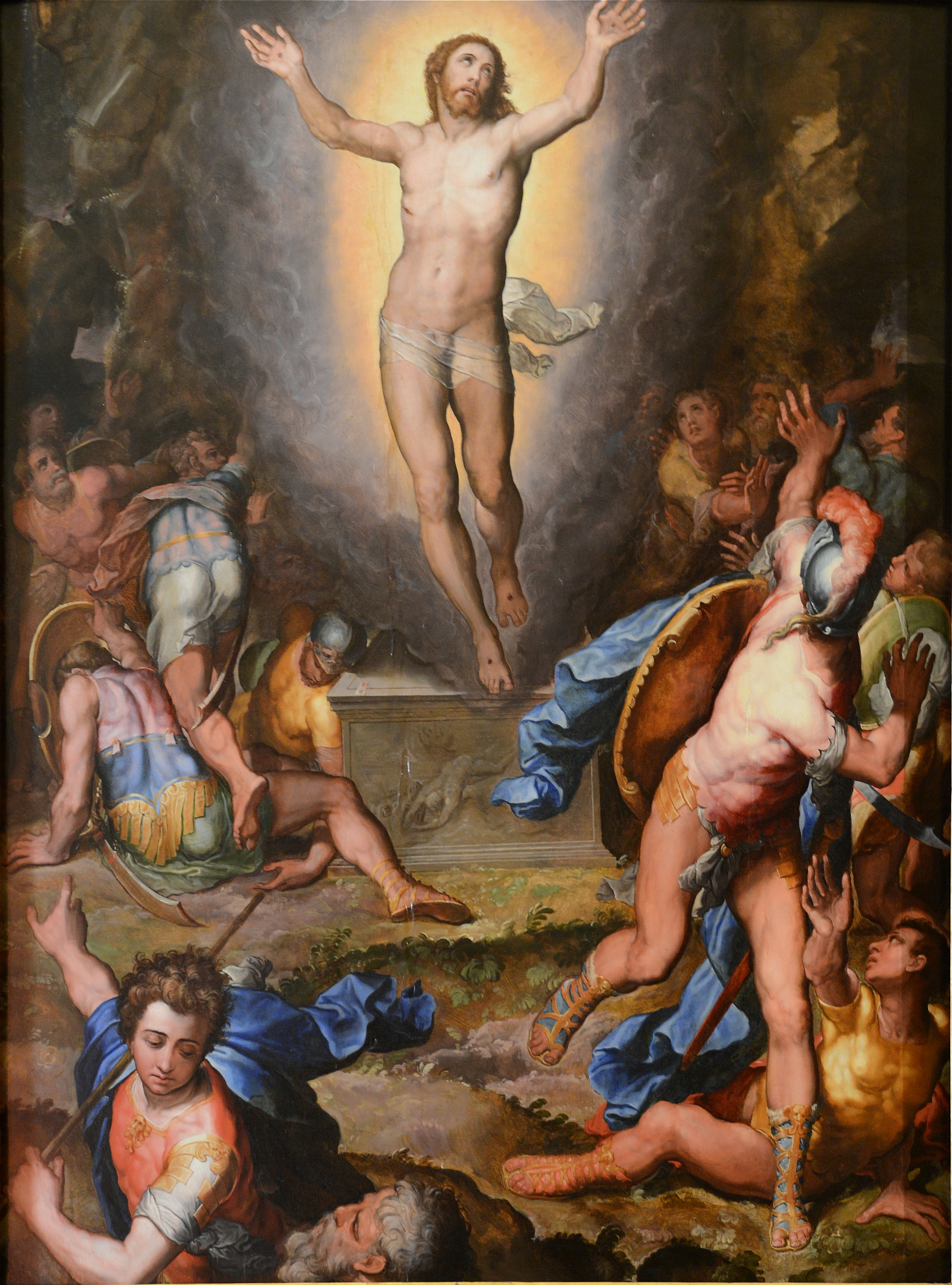
Marco Pino, Resurrection of Christ, 1555, Galleria Borghese

Marco Pino or Marco da Siena (1521–1583) was an Italian painter of the Renaissance and Mannerist period. Born in Costalpino and first trained in Siena, he later worked in Rome and in Naples, where he died. He was putatively a pupil of the painters Beccafumi and Daniele da Volterra. The biographer Filippo Baldinucci also says he worked for Baldassare Peruzzi.

Among his pupils in Messina was his son-in-law, Antonio Spanò. Fabrizio Santafede was his pupil in Naples.
