= Fabrizio Santafede =

Italian painter

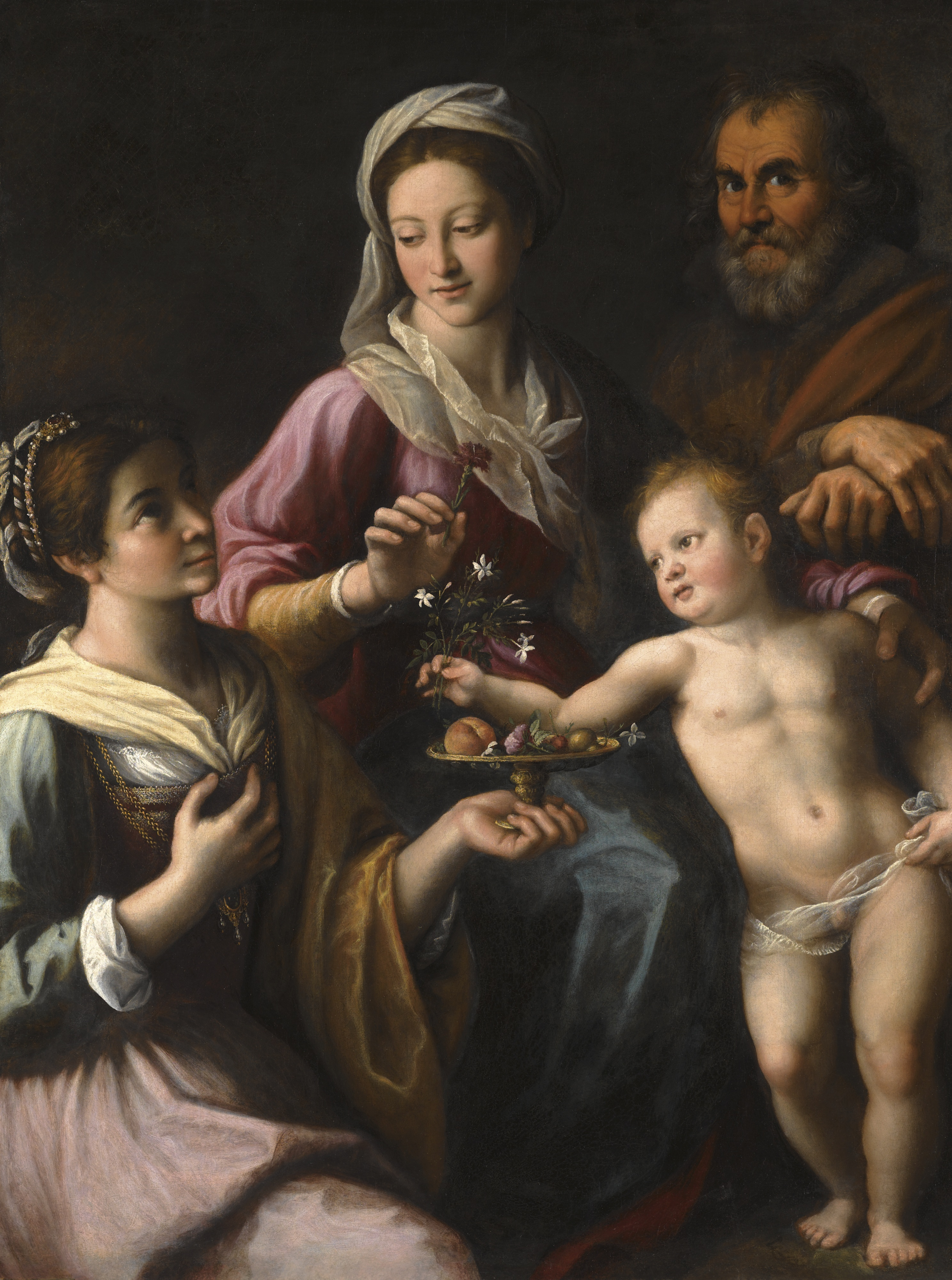
The Holy Family with Saint Dorothea

Fabrizio Santafede or Fabrizio Santaféde (c. 1560–1623/28) was an Italian painter known for his altarpieces. He painted in a style that rejected the Mannerism popular in the Naples of his time and evident in the works of Francesco Curia.

== Life ==
Born in Naples, he began as a pupil of his father, the painter Francesco Santafede, and later became a pupil of Marco Pino. He may have been one of the collaborators of Pino on the decoration of the church of S Giovanni Fiorentini in Naples. He traveled extensively, including to Bologna, Florence, Rome, and Venice in his study of the great masters.

He became a dealer in antiques and paintings. He painted extensively in Naples, including an Assumption and Coronation of the Virgin for Santa Donna Regina Nuova. The Baroque painter Massimo Stanzione is mentioned as one of his pupils.

Legend has it that during the sack of Naples in 1647 by insurgents under Masaniello two houses in which Santafede had painted frescos were spared out of respect for the artist.

== Bibliography ==
- De Dominici, Bernardo (1742). Vite dei Pittori, Scultori, ed Architetti Napolitani, Volume II. Nalples: Stamperia del Ricciardi. pp. 223–236.
- Farquhar, Maria (1855). Ralph Nicholson Wornum (ed.). Biographical catalogue of the principal Italian painters. London: Woodfall & Kinder. p. 159.
- Wittkower, Rudolf (1993). Pelican History of Art, Art and Architecture Italy, 1600-1750. 1980. Penguin Books.
