= Andrea Sabbatini =

Italian painter

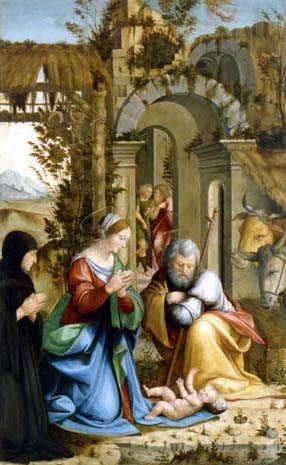
- Nativity, one of the most beautiful works of Andrea Sabbatini
- Born: 1487; Salerno
- Died: 1530 (aged 42–43)
- Occupation: Painter
- Relatives: Silvestro Sabbatini

Andrea Sabbatini (1487–1530) (var. Andrea Sabatini or Andrea da Salerno) was an Italian painter of the Renaissance.

He was born in Salerno, and initially trained under Raimondo Epifanio in Naples, but moved to Rome and became a close disciple of Raphael.

Andrea da Salerno created a number of important paintings with religious motives, such as The Adoration of the Cross, The Seven Church Teachers, Saint Nicholas in a Throne Between his Saviors, Offering of the Kings, Madonna with Child, etc., which are displayed in the Museum of Naples. He also produced frescoes in churches, such as in Santa Maria delle Grazie, San Gennaro dei Poveri, and others.

It is said that Andrea da Salerno was Raphael's disciple, and absorbed most of his style. This is particularly evident in one of his last works, The Nativity. But in 1985 some scholars complained that he was not the creator of this "Nativity".

He served as one of the Captains Regent of the Republic of San Marino from April to September 1527.

== Gallery ==
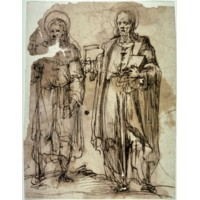
Two Saints

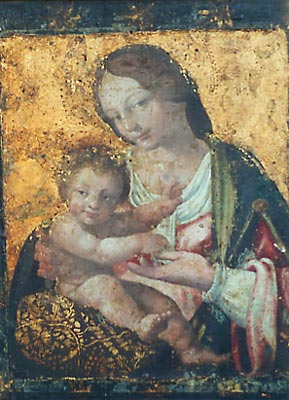
Madonna with Child

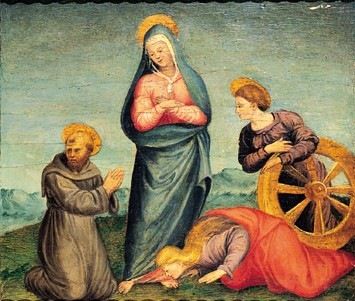
Religious Scenes (detail)

== Bibliography ==
- De Dominici, Bernardo (1742). Vite dei Pittori, Scultori, ed Architetti Napolitani, Volume II. Nalples: Stamperia del Ricciardi. pp. 33–51.
- Giovanni Previtali,Andrea da Salerno nel Rinascimento meridionale (Andrea da Salerno During the Middle Renaissance), Catalogo della mostra Padula (SA) 1986, Certosa di San Lorenzo, Edizioni Centro Di, Firenze, 1986, ISBN 88-7038-121-8
