= Hermitage of Camaldoli =

Monastery in Naples, Italy

Coordinates: 40°51′30″N 14°11′31″E

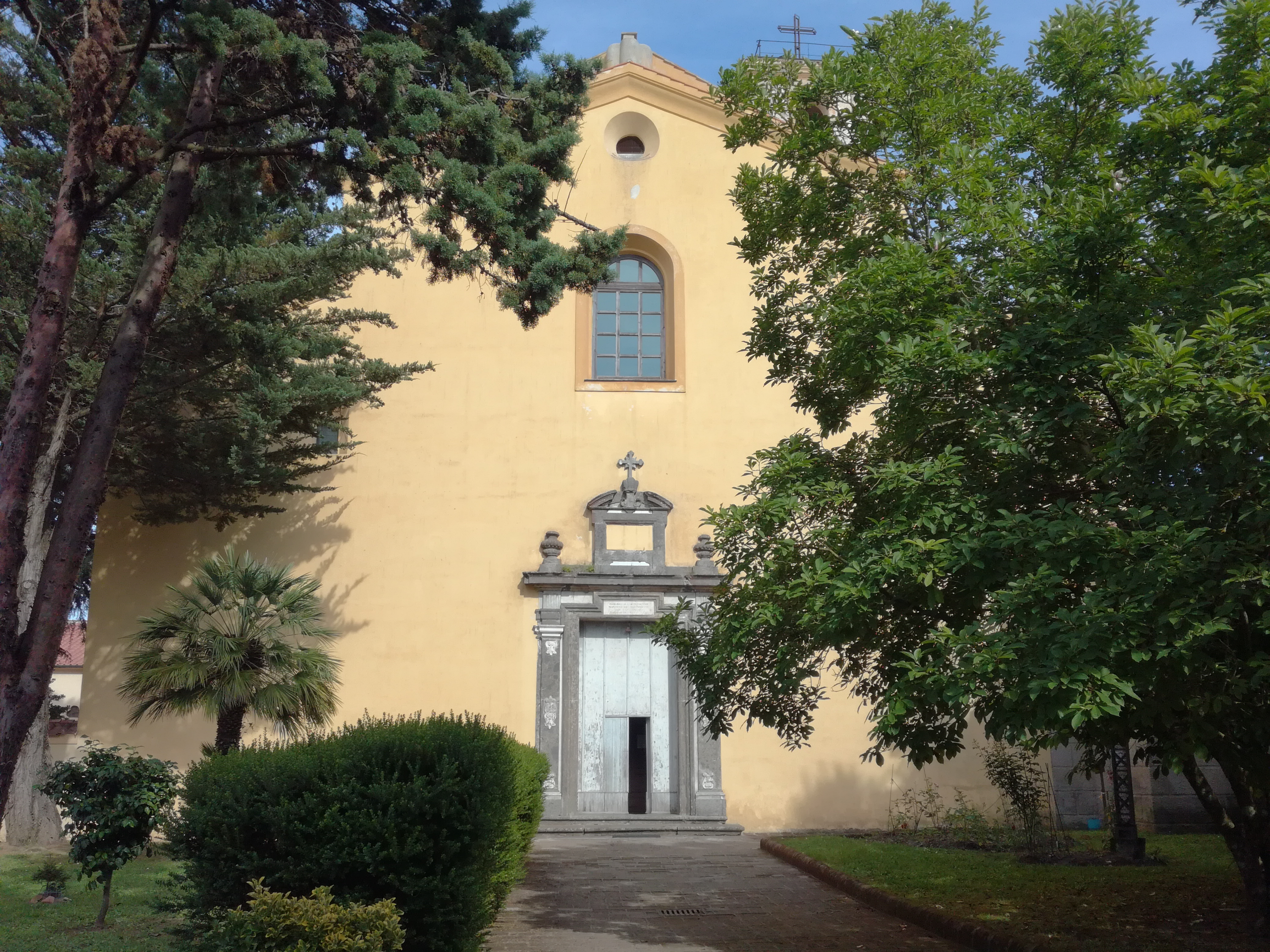
Camaldoli monastery in Naples

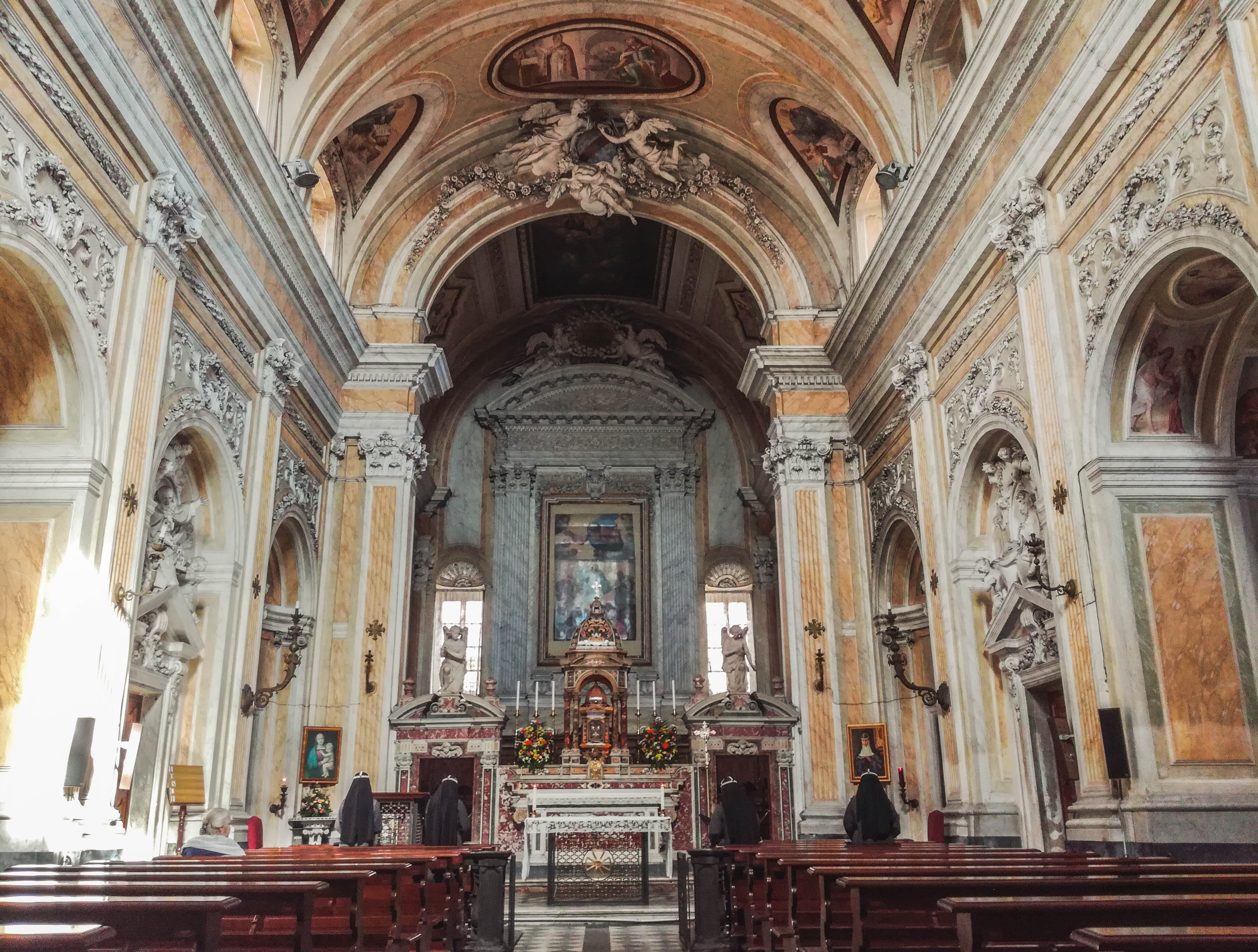
Interior

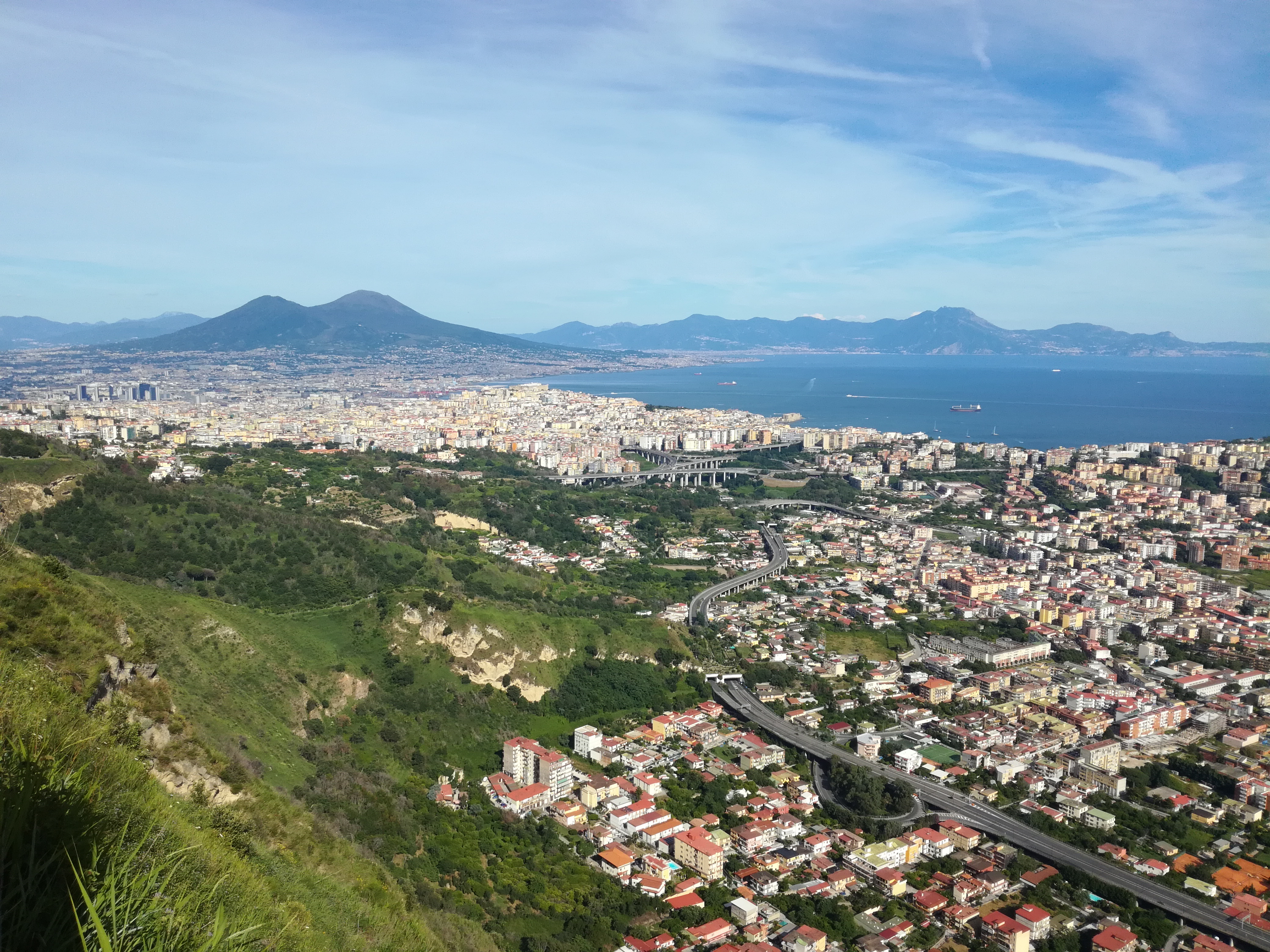
View from the monastery towards the city center of Naples and Mount Vesuvius

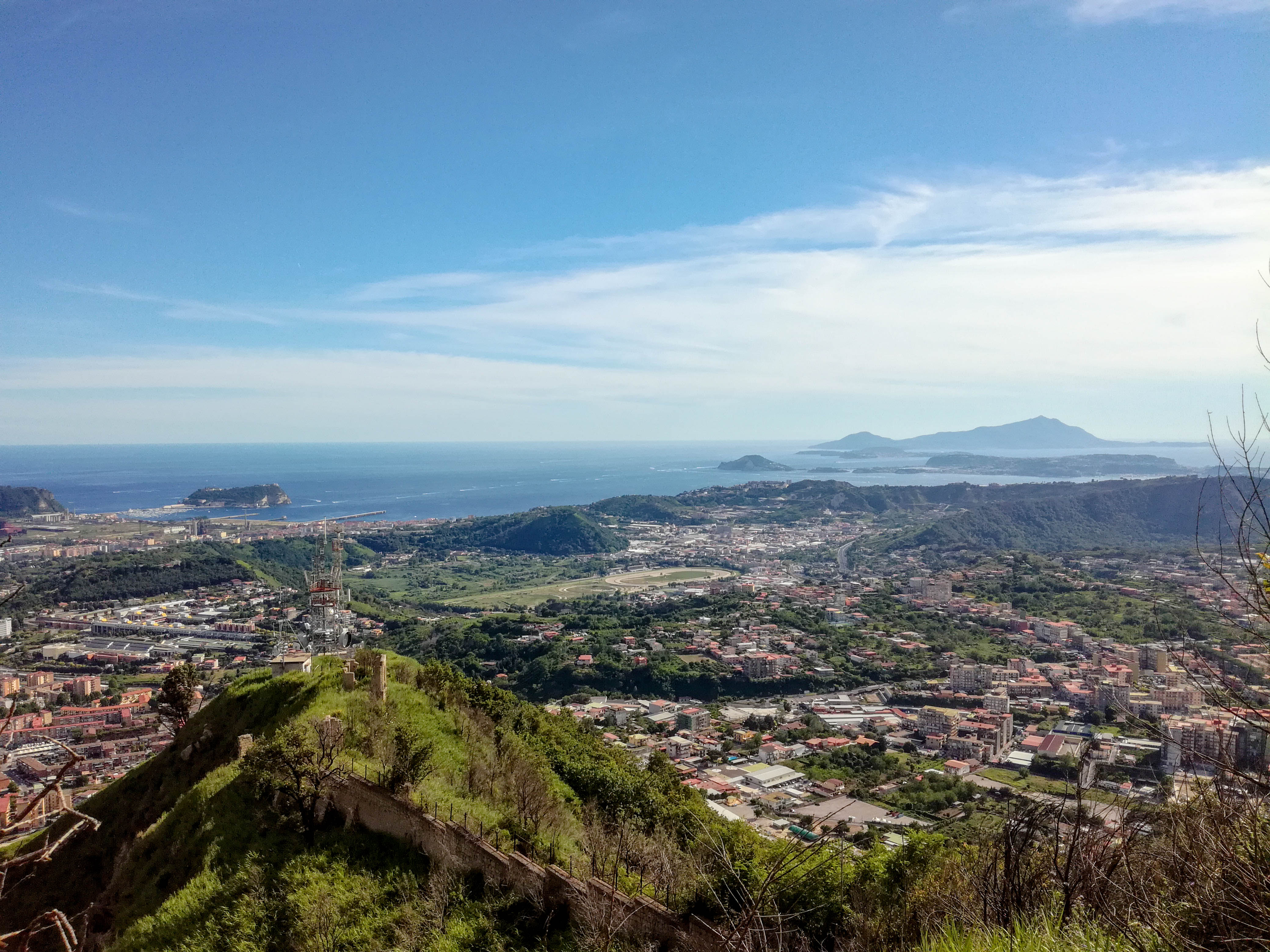
Another view from the monastery towards the Phlegraean Fields

The Hermitage of Camaldoli, in Italian Complesso dell'Eremo dei Camaldoli, is a hermitage in Naples, Campania, Italy — also known in Italian as Eremo Santissimo Salvatore Camaldoli. Originally intended as an actual hermitage, a place for religious seclusion for male ascetics, the complex has served Brigidine nuns since 1998. The complex is located at Via dell'Eremo 87, at an elevation of 458 meters (1502'), the highest point in Naples.

== History ==
Founded at the request of Giovanni D'Avalos, son of Alfonso d'Avalos, Marquise del Vasto, the hermitage was constructed in 1585 by the Camaldolese congregation of Monte Corona on the ruins of an ancient chapel, founded by San Gaudioso in 439. On November 23, 1662, Pope Alexander VII elevated the Hermitage to a Novitiate. In May 1771, Pope Clement XIV combined it with three other convents.

During its life, the monastery was suppressed twice; first during the Napoleonic period in 1807. With the beginning of Naples' so-called French decade, the monastery and the church were stripped of all property and the monks expelled from the convent. In 1820 Ferdinand I, King of the Two Sicilies, decreed the hermits could return.

In 1866, due to suppression laws issued by the Savoy unitary government, the Camaldolese were again expropriated of all assets and expelled again. They returned there definitively in 1885, with the help of Cardinal Guglielmo Sanfelice d'Acquavilla, who interceded on their behalf and allowed restitution of what had been taken from the monks. In 1885, the complex was again assigned and entrusted to the Benedictine Camaldolesis.

By the late 1990s, due to the drastic reduction of vocations, only two monks remained. Since 1998, after being renovated and refurbished, the hermitage has served the Brigidine nuns of the order of the Santissimo Salvatore of Santa Brigida.

== Architecture and art ==
Replacing the ancient church accommodated on the site, the new complex was designed by Domenico Fontana, reflecting the sixteenth-century architecture of the late Renaissance of Campania.

The monastery complex includes the main church with its bell tower, the large main guesthouse, with guest rooms overlooking a wide panorama from Vesuvius, Capri and Ischia; 16 monastic cells, each with bathroom, heat and telephone; two refectories; meeting and reading room; library; conference room :— all surrounded by cultivated kitchen gardens. The property hosts numerous cell towers and satellite dishes, befitting its location on the highest point in Naples.

The church's large altar is the work of Cosimo Fanzago, and numerous significant paintings and frescoes include those by Francesco Francanzano; Angelo Mozzillo; Luca Giordano (the Immaculate Conception, the Transfiguration and the Sacred Family in front of the Cross); Giovanni Bernardino Azzolini (The Miracle of St. Bernardino); Federico Barocci; Antiveduto Gramatica and Massimo Stanzione (The Last Supper); Luigi Rodriguez, Fabrizio Santafede; Cesare Fracanzano, and Ippolito Borghese.
