= Cesare Fracanzano =

Italian painter

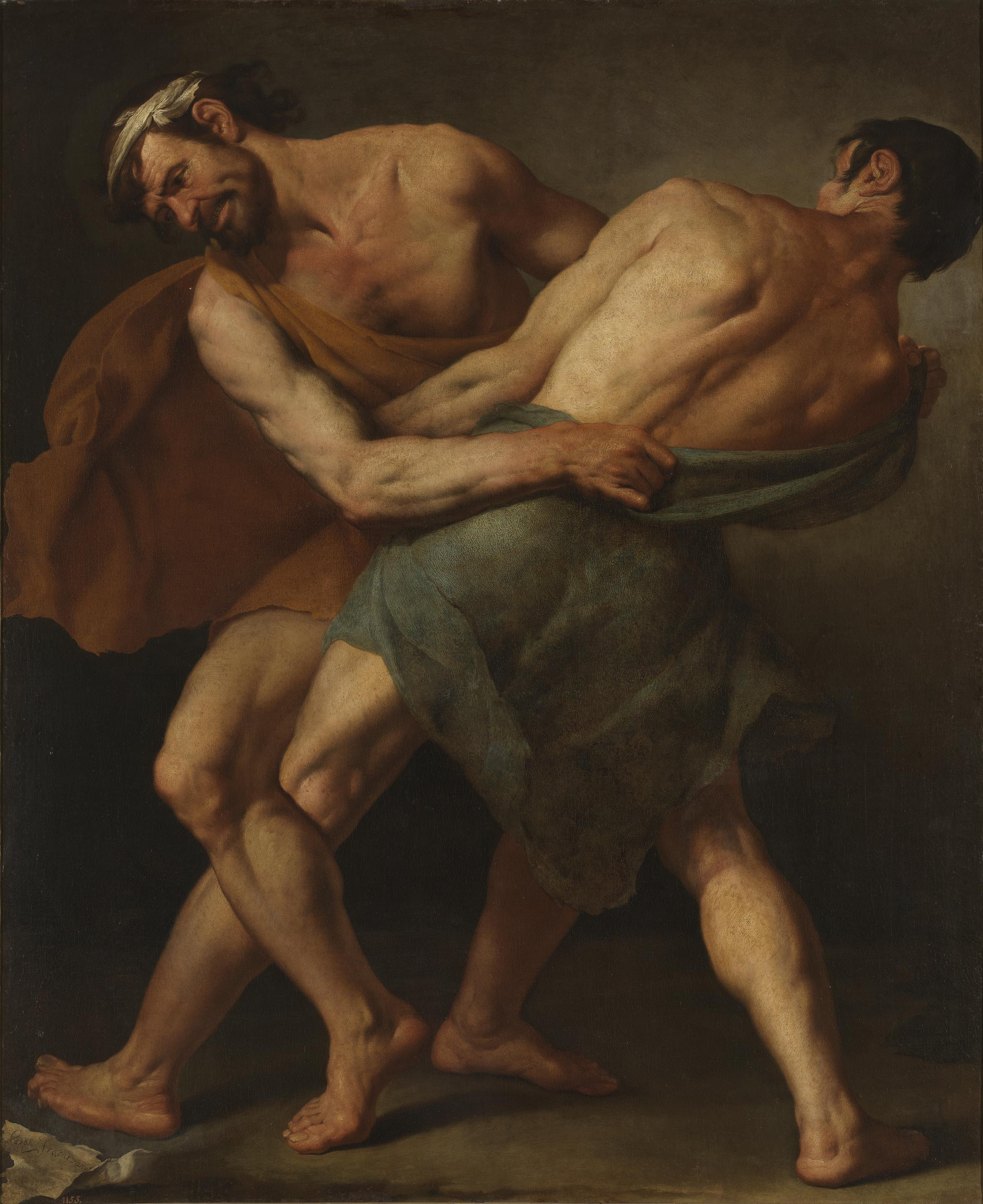
- Two Wrestlers, c. 1637, oil on canvas, Museo del Prado, Madrid
- Born: Cesare Fracanzano; 9 October 1609; Bisceglie, Kingdom of Naples
- Died: 1651 (aged 41–42); Barletta, Kingdom of Naples
- Education: Jusepe de Ribera
- Known for: painting, fresco
- Movement: Caravaggisti
- Spouse: Beatrice Covelli (m. 1626)
- Relatives: Francesco Fracanzano (brother)

Cesare Fracanzano (9 October 1609 – 1651), was a Neapolitan painter who flourished in the 17th century. He was a pupil of Spagnoletto. Although his roots were in the Naples of Caravaggio, his own work leaned more towards Baroque, foreshadowing the styles of artists such as Mattia Preti and Luca Giordano.

== Biography ==
=== Early life and education ===
Cesare Fracanzano was born in Bisceglie on 9 October 1605. His father, Alessandro, was a nobleman and Mannerist painter from Verona. Cesare and his brother Francesco spent their early years traveling with their father, assisting him with decorative commissions across different towns of southern Italy.

In 1622, Cesare and Francesco moved to Naples, where they entered the highly influential workshop of the prominent master Jusepe de Ribera (also known as Lo Spagnoletto). While Cesare eventually moved to Barletta and adopted a style that blended Ribera's naturalism with more academic classicism, Francesco remained largely in Naples, becoming a notable figure in the Neapolitan Naturalist movement.

Fracanzano's early work reflects a unique synthesis of regional styles. He combined the sharp, textured naturalism and tenebrism he learned in Ribera's workshop with Tintoretto's dynamic, bold brushwork, as well as the refined, academic classicism and balanced compositions of the Carracci and Guido Reni.

=== Mature career ===
After many years of artistic training and work in Naples, Fracanzano settled in Barletta in 1626, where he married Beatrice Covelli. Until 1635, he primarily worked in his native Apulia, producing several significant pieces for local churches and noble palaces. In these works, he incorporated the vibrant colours and light effects of Anthony van Dyck into his established Caravaggesque and Riberesque style.

Fracanzano also fulfilled several commissions in Naples and Rome, where his style became increasingly academic, reflecting the influence of Massimo Stanzione and Giovanni Lanfranco. According to Bernardo de' Dominici, Fracanzano took an active part in the Neapolitan Revolt of 1647, becoming a member of the Compagnia della Morte (Company of Death), led by Aniello Falcone. Created by Falcone to seek bloody revenge against Spanish soldiers after a pupil from his school was killed, the band included prominent artists from Falcone's circle, such as Salvator Rosa and Domenico Gargiulo. The group was said to paint by day and roam the streets by night, conducting punitive expeditions and targeting Spanish occupants to liberate the city. Following the collapse of the Neapolitan Republic and fearing execution or harsh retaliation by the Spanish authorities under the Count of Oñate, Cesare fled Naples and moved for a brief period in France.

In his later life, Fracanzano returned to Barletta, where he died between late 1651 and November 1652. His pupils included Carlo Rosa, Francesco Antonio Altobello and Nicola Glizi. His son, Michelangelo, who was also a painter, died in France around 1685.

== Gallery ==
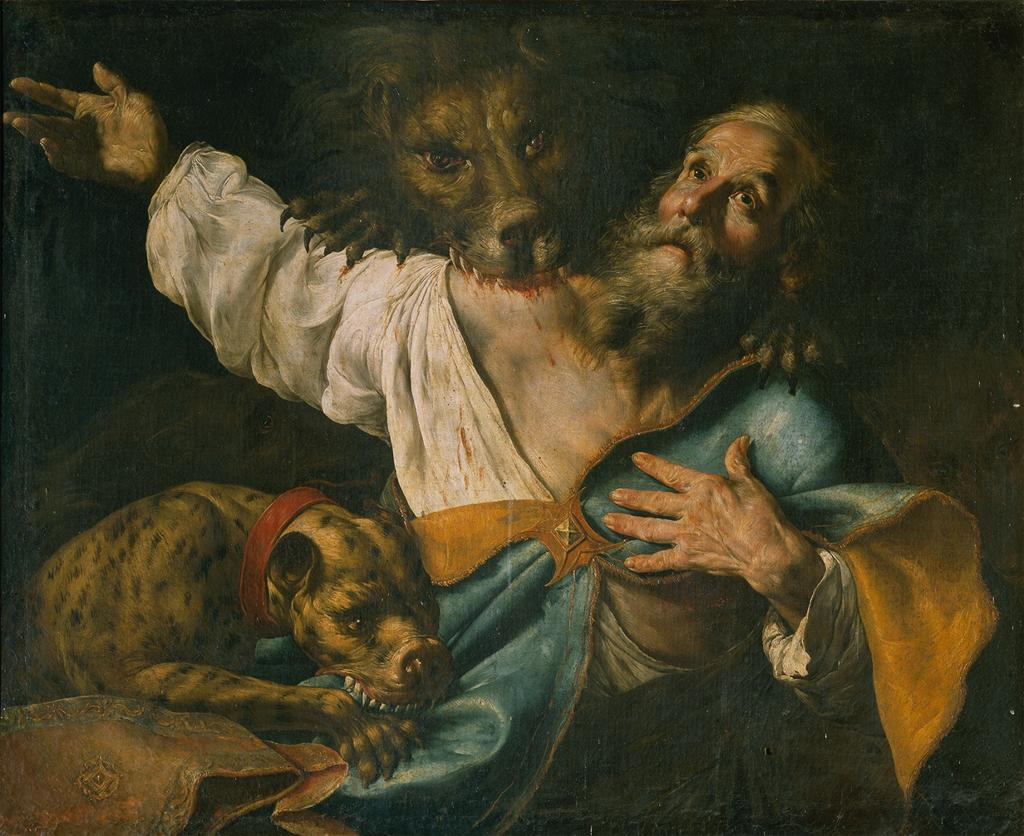
Martyrdom of Ignatius of Antiochie, Galleria Borghese, Rome

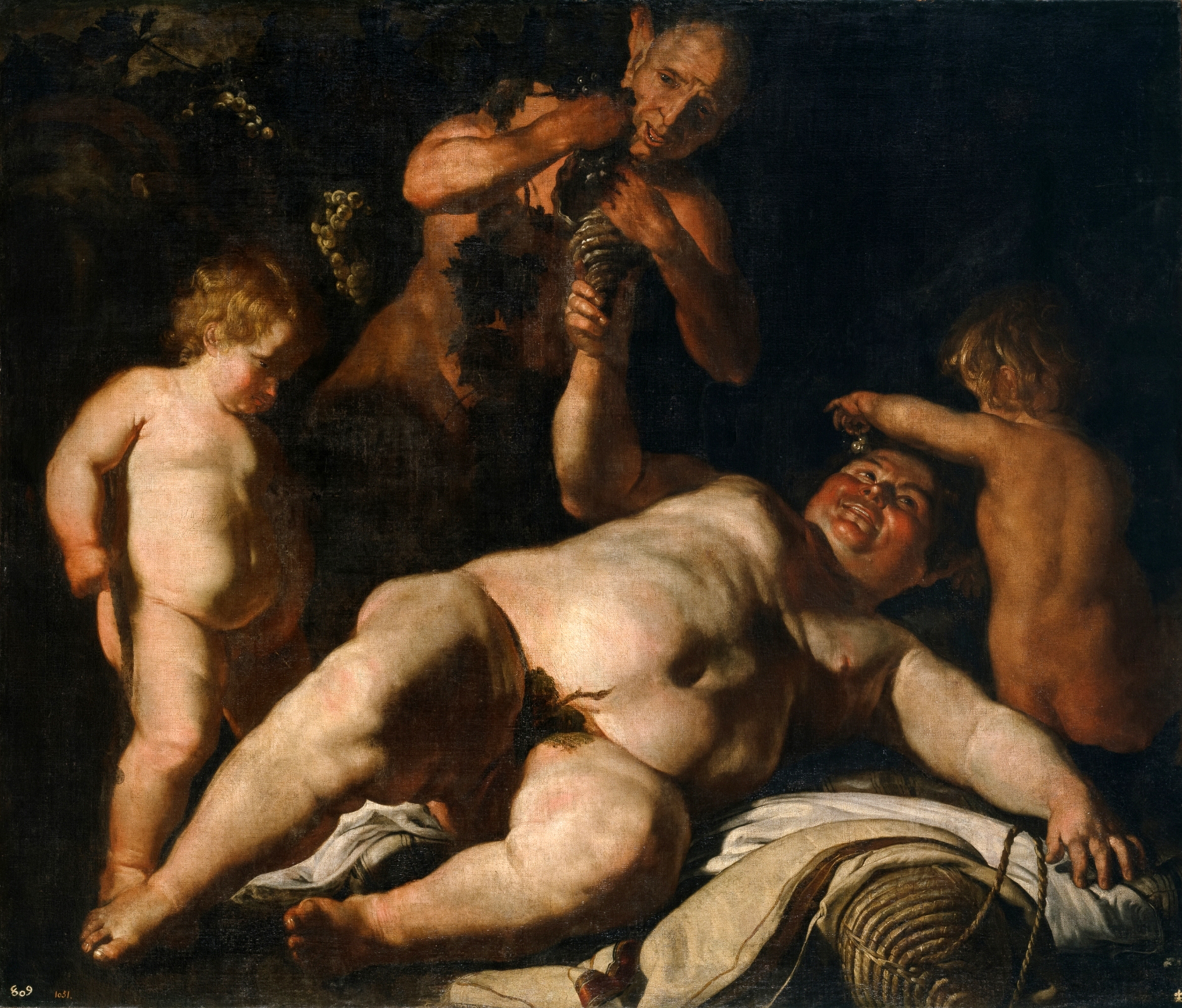
Drunken Silenus, Museo del Prado, Madrid

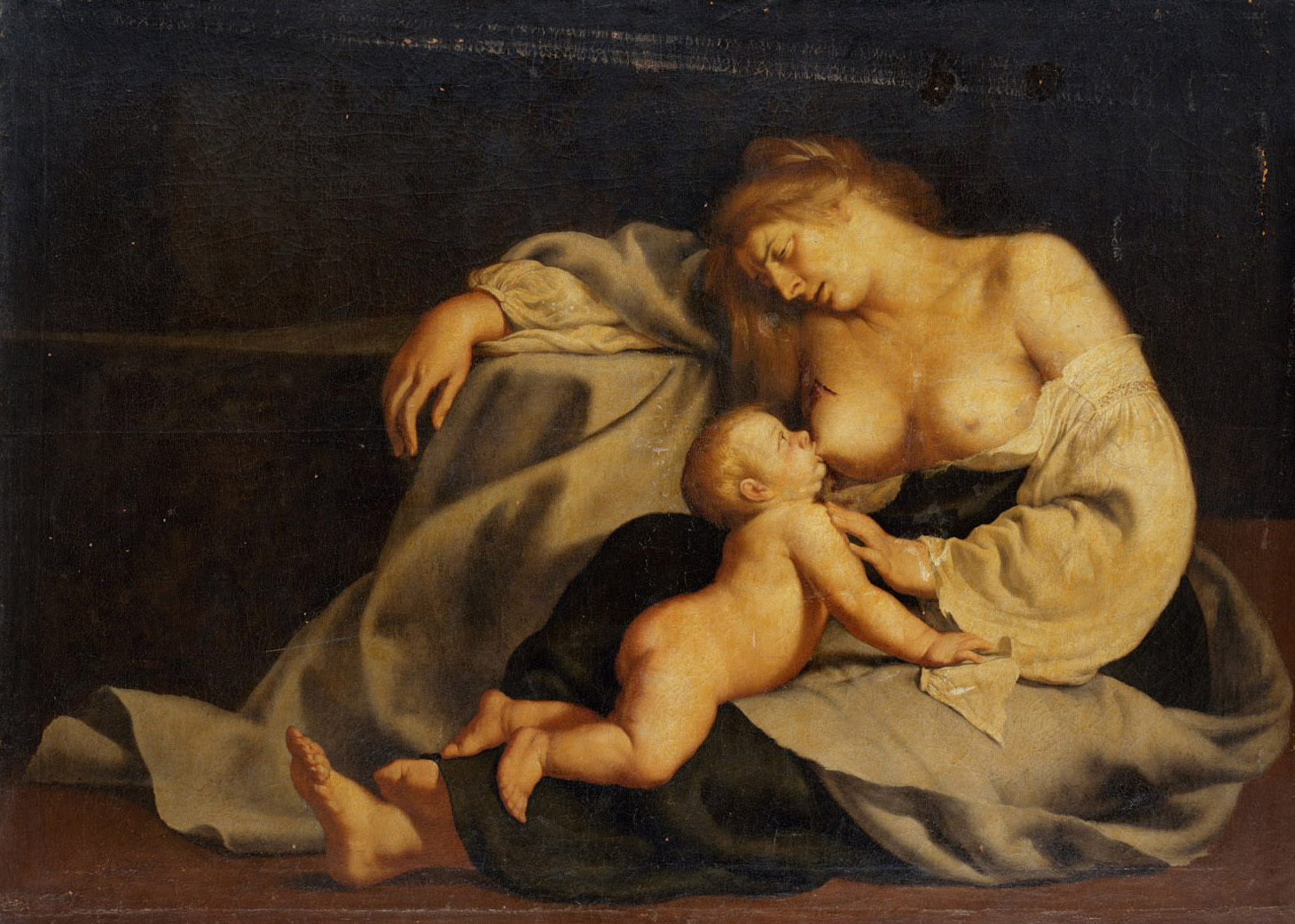
Dying mother, Kunsthistorisches Museum, Vienna

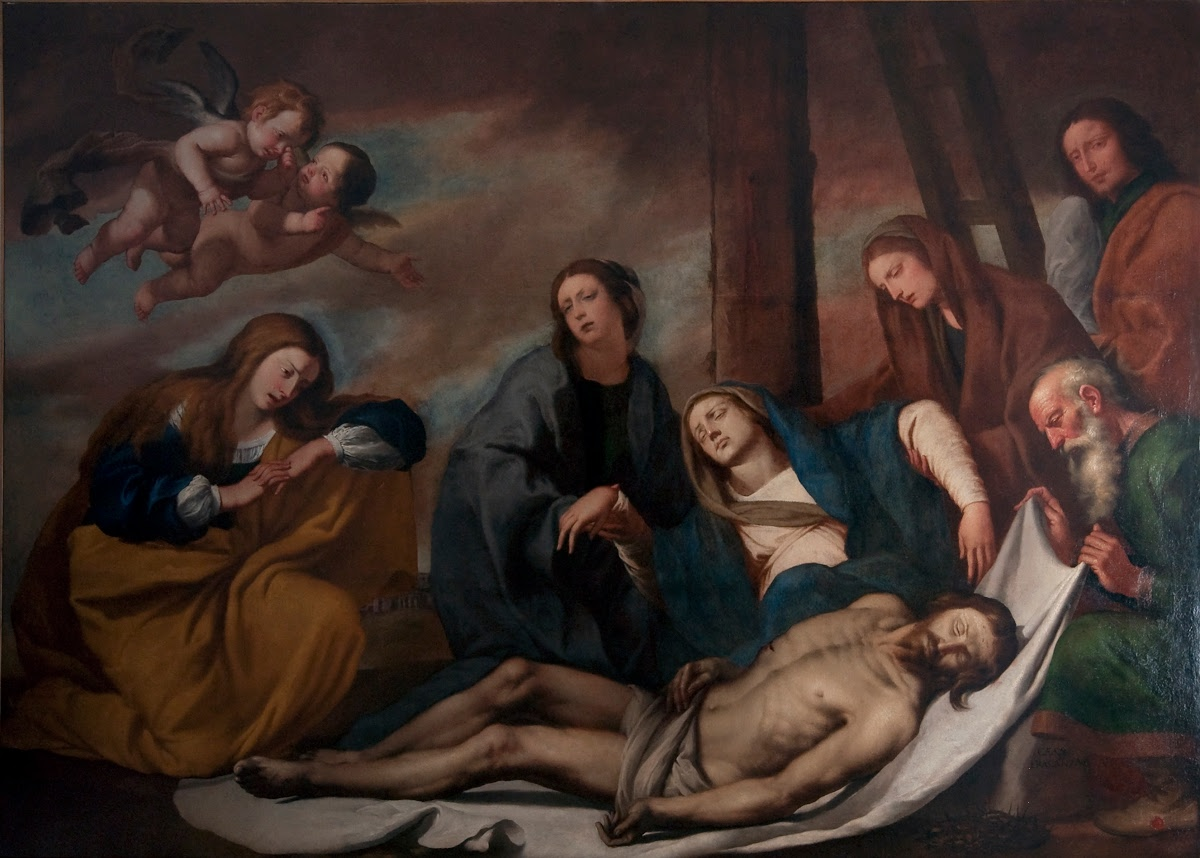
Pietà, Pio Monte della Misericordia, Naples
