= Altobello =

Altobello is both a masculine Italian given name and a surname.

Notable people with the given name include:

- Altobello de Averoldi (died 1531), Italian Roman Catholic prelate
- Altobello Melone (c. 1490–1491 – before 1543), Italian painter
- Altobello Persio (1507–1593), Italian sculptor

Notable people with the surname include:

- Emil Altobello (1949–2025), American politician in Connecticut
- Francesco Antonio Altobello (1637–1703), Italian painter
- Gerry Altobello, Canadian politician
