= Woman Playing the Clavichord =

Painting by Bernardo Cavallino

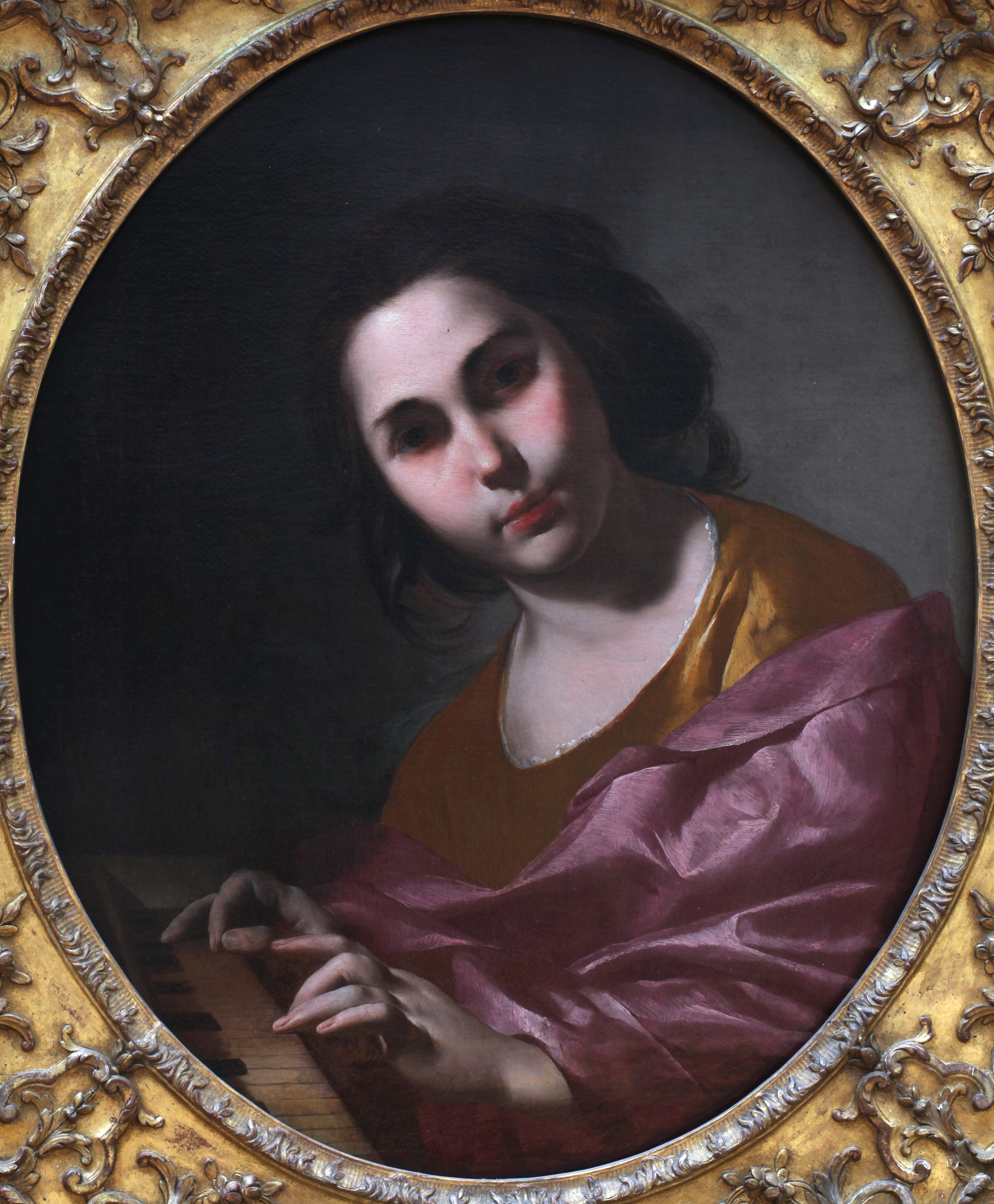
Woman Playing the Clavichord (La Joueuse de clavicorde) 1645-1650 by Bernardo Cavallino. Oil on Canvas. Collection of Musée des Beaux-Arts de Lyon. H. 79; L. 64 cm. Inventory Number: 1968-149.

Woman Playing the Clavichord or The Clavichord Player (French - La Joueuse de clavicorde) is a 1645-1650 oil on canvas painting by Bernardo Cavallino. It has been in the collection of the Museum of Fine Arts of Lyon since 1968. Bernardo Cavallino was Neapolitan painter who usually worked small formats and painted intimate scenes. Cavallino's The Singer (French - La cantatrice; Museo Capodimonte, Naples) was conceived by Cavallino as a companion to The Clavichord Player.
