= Francesco Fracanzano =

Italian painter

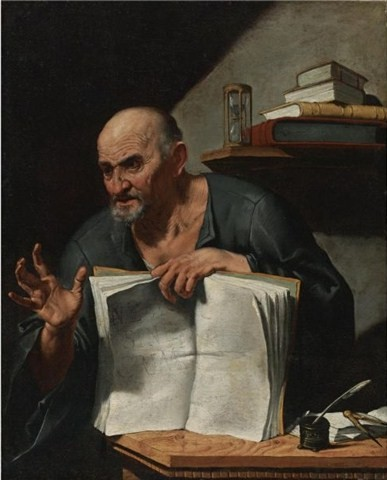
- Portrait of Dionysius Cato (c. 1650s), oil on canvas, private collection.
- Born: 9 July 1612; Monopoli, Kingdom of Naples
- Died: 1656 (aged 43–44); Naples, Kingdom of Naples
- Education: Jusepe de Ribera
- Known for: Painting
- Movement: Baroque
- Relatives: Cesare Fracanzano (brother)

Francesco Fracanzano (9 July 1612 – 1656) was an Italian painter who participated in the Masaniello rebellion. Francanzano was the brother of Cesare Fracanzano, a pupil of Spagnoletto and the master of Salvator Rosa, whose sister he married.

== Biography ==
=== Early career ===
Francesco Fracanzano was born in Monopoli, near Bari, on 9 July 1612. After moving to Naples with his family in 1625, he married Giovanna, sister of Salvator Rosa, in 1632. According to Bernardo de' Dominici, he trained alongside his brother in Jusepe de Ribera's workshop in Naples.

His earliest works are a series of canvases dating to 1635 for the Church of San Gregorio Armeno in Naples. These pieces blend Ribera's style with contemporary Flemish influences, particularly those of Van Dyck. During this period, Fracanzano produced works combining Ribera's style with the Neapolitan naturalist tradition, as represented by artists such as Filippo Vitale, Giovanni Do, and Bartolomeo Passante.

Several other works have been attributed to Fracanzano's early period due to their compositional consistency and adherence to Ribera's style. These include: Man Reading (Provincial Museum of Lecce); Jesus Among the Doctors (Gesù Nuovo, Naples); The Return of the Prodigal Son and Lot and His Daughters (Monopoli Cathedral); and the so-called Portrait of Ludovico Carducci Artemisio (Carducci Artemisio collection, Rome).

=== Mature work ===
The Drunken Silenus, oil on canvas, Harvard Art Museums

Derived from Ribera’s Drunken Silenus — and thus from the naturalistic reinterpretation of mythological themes initiated by the Valencian master — are the Bacchanal (Fogg Art Museum, Cambridge) and the Drunken Silenus (Museo del Prado, Madrid). Dating from a little later is the Triumph of Bacchus (Museo di Capodimonte, Naples). While this work retains certain stylistic traits characteristic of the San Gregorio Armeno paintings, it marks a clear shift towards the classicism of Massimo Stanzione and Simon Vouet, which became dominant in the final phase of the artist's career. From the mid-1630s, Fracanzano adopted a more painterly style, embracing Flemish influences and aligning himself with the aesthetic tendencies of Bernardo Cavallino. This is evident in St. Catherine of Alexandria (INPS, Rome), that successfully reconciles modern painterly approaches with meticulous attention to detail. The pearly rendering of the face recalls Vouet, while the austere restraint of the forms recalls Francesco Guarino.

The Denial of St. Peter (Boblot collection, Paris) also echoes the San Gregorio Armeno canvases. This is evident not only in the striking resemblance of the central figures, but also in the distinctive chromatic emphasis given to the garments. The Ecce Homo (1647; New York, Morton B. Harris priv. col.), belongs to a later, more naturalistic phase. This approach is characterised by a more pronounced compositional harshness, which reaches its climax in Christ Before Caiaphas (Naples, private collection).

=== Later career ===
Dating to the final phase of Fracanzano's career is the Death of St. Joseph for the Archconfraternity of the Pilgrims (1652). This work reveals a return to Guarino's style, as well as a significant shift towards Classicism. De' Dominici provided an extensive description and effusive praise, describing the painting as 'one of the finest in our city and a model for our artists in the grand and heroic style'. Fracanzano's final documented works are a Pietà, a St. Jerome and a St. John the Baptist. Fracanzano died of the plague in 1656.

== Gallery ==
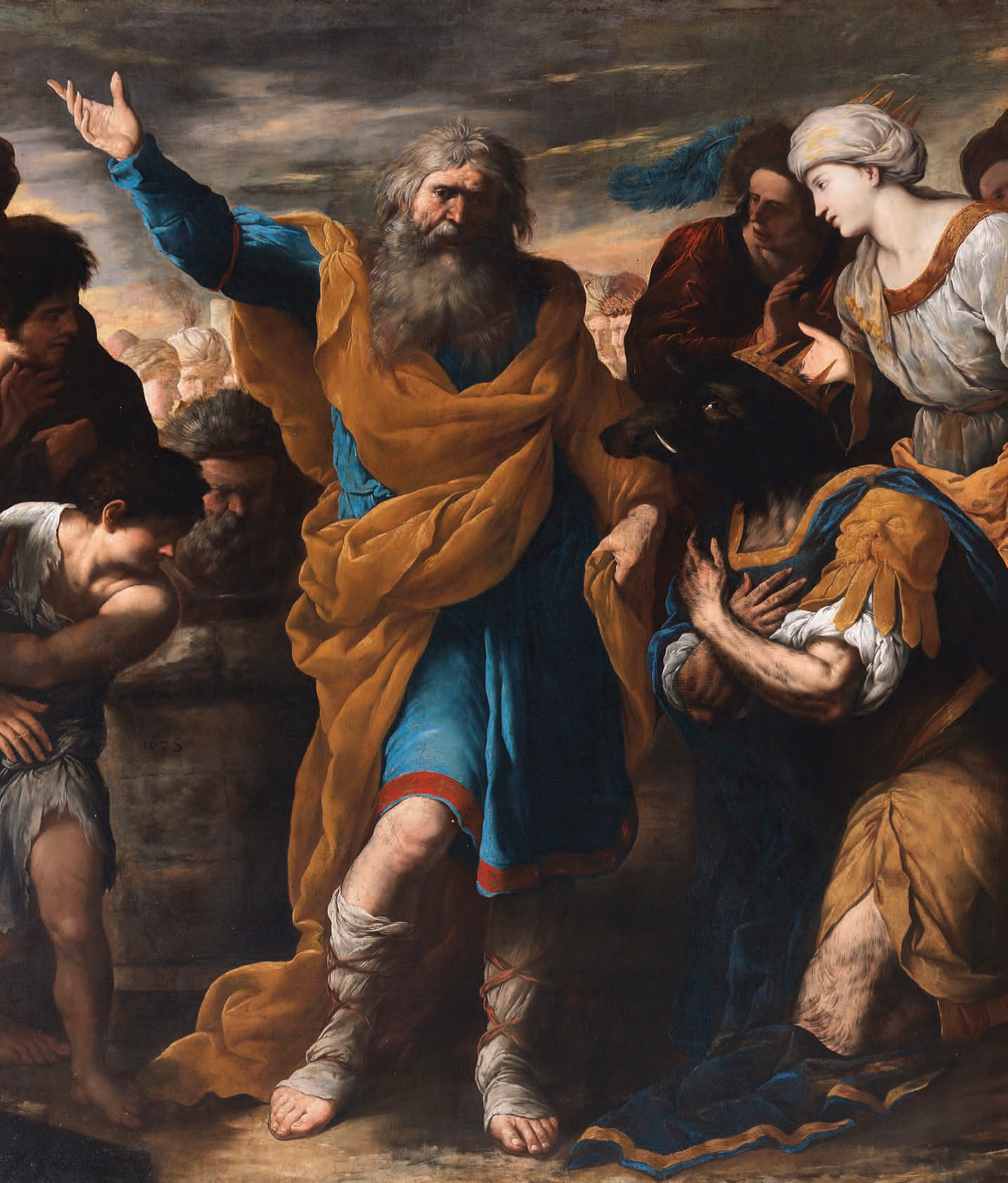
King Tiridates implores Saint Gregory to restore his human form (detail), oil on canvas, Naples, San Gregorio Armeno

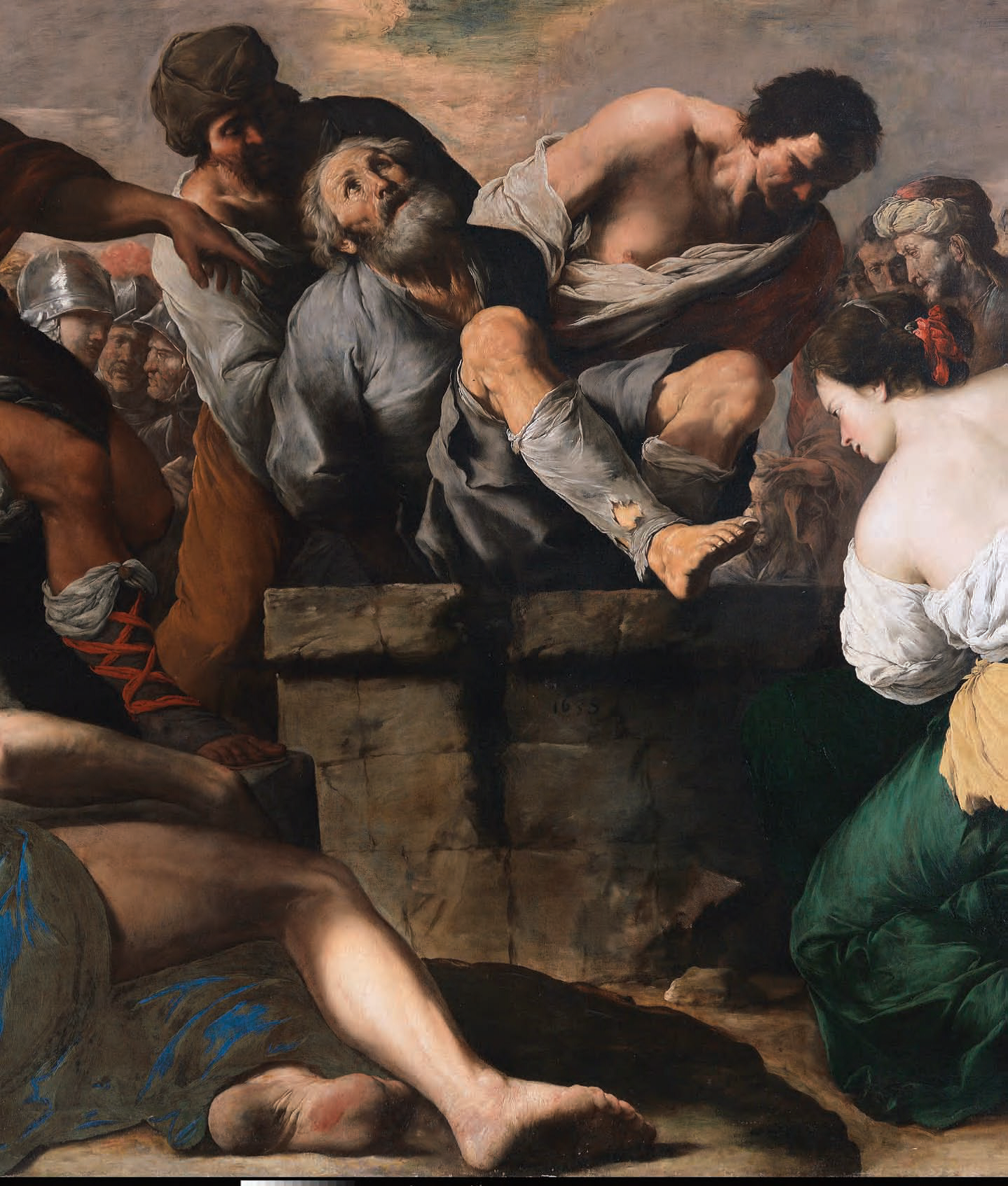
Saint Gregory thrown into the pit (detail), oil on canvas, Naples, San Gregorio Armeno

Joseph being sold into slavery, oil on canvas, private collection

Kitchen Interior, Naples, Museo di Capodimonte

== Bibliography ==
- Romano, Monica (1997). "FRACANZANO, Francesco". Dizionario Biografico degli Italiani (in Italian). Vol. 49: Forino–Francesco da Serino. Rome: Istituto dell'Enciclopedia Italiana. ISBN 978-88-12-00032-6.
- Alabiso, Annachiara (2003). "Fracanzano, Francesco". Grove Art Online. Oxford University Press. doi:10.1093/oao/9781884446054.013.90000371811.
