= Bernardo Cavallino =

Italian painter and draughtsman

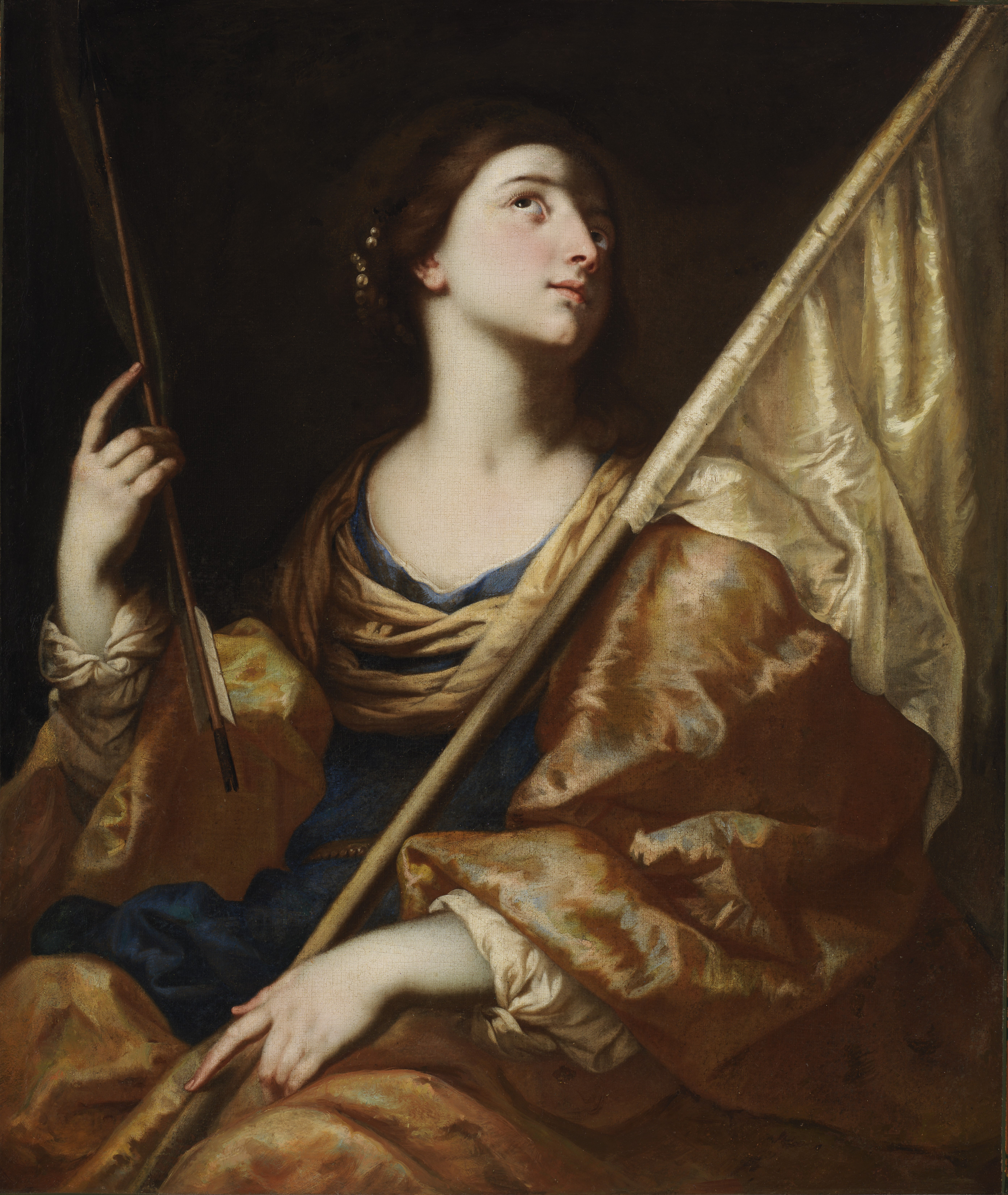
- Saint Ursula, Smithsonian American Art Museum, Washington, D.C.
- Born: 25 August 1616; Naples, Kingdom of Naples
- Died: 1656 (aged 39–40); Naples, Kingdom of Naples
- Education: Massimo Stanzione
- Known for: Painting
- Notable work: Woman Playing the Clavichord (1645-1650)
- Movement: Baroque

Bernardo Cavallino (25 August 1616 – 1656) was an Italian painter and draughtsman. He is regarded as one of the most original painters active in Naples during the first half of the 17th century.

It is said that he trained with Massimo Stanzione, befriended the painter Andrea Vaccaro, and was influenced by Anthony van Dyck, but his paintings could also be described as equidistant from Caravaggio and Bartolomé Esteban Murillo in styles; tenebrism enveloped with a theatrical sweetness, a posed ecstasy and feeling characteristic of the high Roman baroque statuary.

While his paintings are some of the more stunningly expressive works emerging from the Neapolitan artists of his day, little is known about the painter's background or training. Of eighty attributed paintings, less than ten are signed. He worked through private dealers and collectors whose records are no longer available.

== Biography ==
=== Probable training and early works, c. 1630–early 1640s ===
According to Bernardo de' Dominici (1742–3), his first biographer, Cavallino’s only master was Massimo Stanzione, whose studio he entered at the age of ten. He stressed that Cavallino underwent an academic training that depended on drawing from the human figure and on a study of literary sources. This account is not entirely convincing, as Cavallino appears from the beginning to have created his own highly personal style from a variety of sources. The three major studios where he might have trained were those of Stanzione, Jusepe de Ribera and Aniello Falcone.

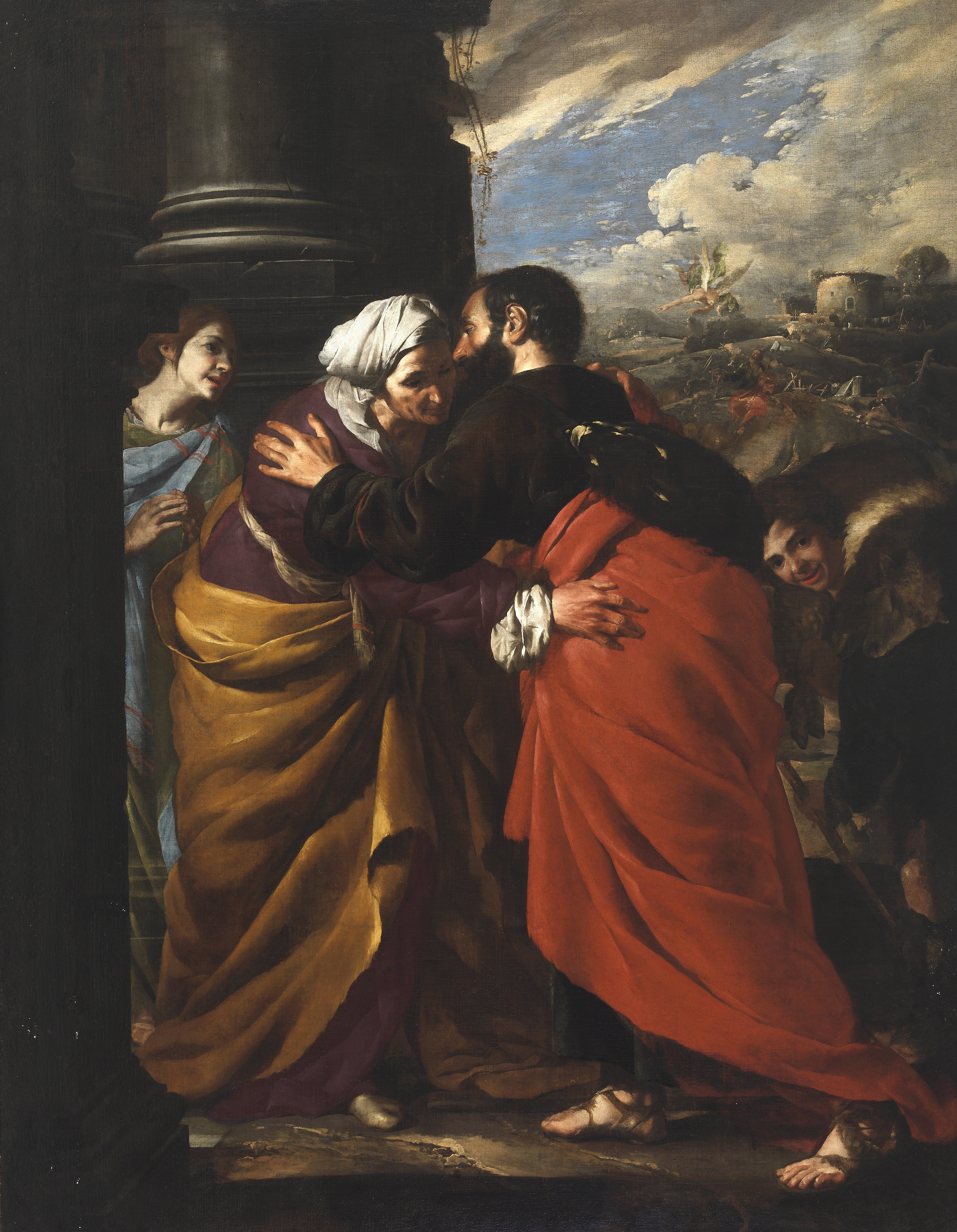
Meeting of Joachim and Anna at the Golden Gate of Jerusalem, Budapest, Museum of Fine Arts

The earliest known paintings attributed to Cavallino, thought to date from the mid-1630s, are the Meeting of Joachim and Anna at the Golden Gate of Jerusalem (Budapest, Museum of Fine Arts), the Martyrdom of St. Bartholomew (Naples, Museo di Capodimonte), the Adoration of the Shepherds (Brunswick, Herzog Anton Ulrich Museum) and the Communion of the Apostles (Milan, priv. col.), all of which have affinities with the work of these three artists and with the Master of the Annunciation to the Shepherds. They show a tentative quality in the arrangement of stiff figures in rows against conventional backgrounds and a tendency to play jewel-like areas of bright reds and blues against predominantly dark tonalities. In their rendering of such surface textures as skin and hair, wood and fur, these early works appear to be more strongly influenced by the naturalism of Ribera and the Master of the Annunciation and by Falcone’s minutely observed genre details than by Stanzione’s grand manner.

Nonetheless it seems apparent that the artist received an academic training in figure drawing, although this could have been obtained in any of the three studios. These works, some of which may have been altarpieces, support de Dominici’s claim that Cavallino began his career working on large-scale public commissions. He wrote that, on the advice of Andrea Vaccaro, Cavallino soon chose to paint the smaller cabinet pictures that were better suited to his talents. In easel paintings of the late 1630s and early 1640s Cavallino moved away from this early severe and tenebrist style to paint smaller, more refined and courtly works. His style became intensely personal and idiosyncratic, and he derived a sophisticated, mannered elegance at least in part from a study of Netherlandish and French prints of the late 16th century and the early 17th by such artists as Hendrick Goltzius and Jacques Callot. The swaying poses and delicately bent heads of the Finding of Moses (late 1630s; Naples, Capodimonte) suggest a close acquaintance with prints of the Goltzius circle.

Cavallino was also influenced by a tendency among painters in Naples from the early 1630s onwards to move away from the dark tonalities of Caravaggesque art towards lighter and brighter palettes and softer, more luminous and painterly effects. In this respect Cavallino’s possible knowledge of Giovanni Benedetto Castiglione’s work is particularly intriguing, but whether there was any connection between the two remains unresolved. Castiglione had arrived in Naples in 1635, introducing a style strongly influenced by Nicolas Poussin and rich in effects of warm colour and light. It is not clear whether Cavallino had a workshop, and, surprisingly, only four drawings have been reasonably attributed to him. These are chalk drawings of male torsos (Naples, Museo di Capodimonte; Naples, National Museum of San Martino; Oxford, Ashmolean Museum) and a study in black and white chalk on paper (New York, Morgan Library & Museum) for a Virgin of the Immaculate Conception, all of which are close in style to the drawings of Falcone.

Cavallino’s Adoration of the Magi (c. 1640; Vienna, Kunsthistorisches Museum) summarizes the characteristics of his early maturity. It retains the naturalistic rendering of surface and dramatic chiaroscuro effects of his first works, yet also develops elements of composition and posture that are indebted to Mannerist art. The shadows are lighter and more transparent, and the predominantly dark tones, accented by greys, reds and blues, are enriched by more delicate mauve-pinks, greens and dull browns. Esther before Ahasuerus (c. 1640; Switzerland, priv. col.), one of his favourite subjects, shows how he used increasing subtlety of gesture and expression to create a dramatic relationship between richly attired, courtly figures. The picture may be tentatively identified with a painting mentioned by de' Dominici in the collection of Francesco Valletta, Naples.

Cavallino also produced around 20 single-figure images of saints, martyrs and allegorical figures, mainly half-length or three-quarter-length. The pair of half-length Apostles, St. Peter and St. Paul (both early 1640s; New York, priv. col.), the earliest signed works by Cavallino, are dark and dramatically lit and deeply indebted to the naturalism of Ribera.

=== Mature works, 1645–50 ===
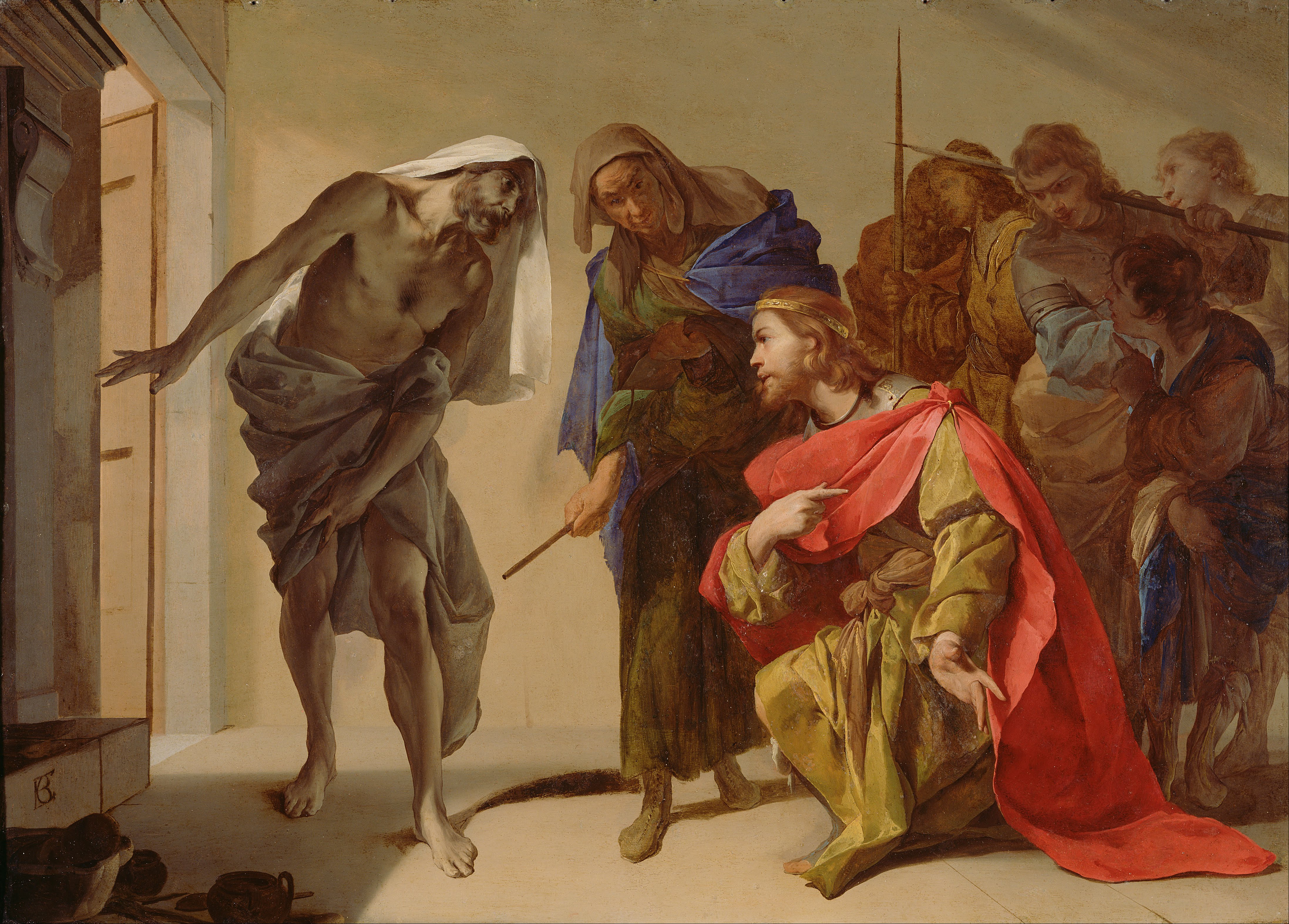
The Shade of Samuel Invoked by Saul, c. 1650, Getty Center, Los Angeles

Cavallino’s only known dated work, St. Cecilia in Ecstasy (1645; Florence, Palazzo Vecchio), a signed altarpiece formerly in the Franciscan church of Sant'Antonio da Padova, Naples, shows his style at midpoint in his career. Replacing the solid, dark backgrounds of his early works, there are complex layers of light and shadow rendered in opaque tones of grey and beige. The palette, with its golds, blues, greyish-greens and dull reds, has a cooler and more opaque quality. The background figures are painted with a loose, fluid touch that he developed further in his late pictures. De' Dominici admired the modello (Naples, Museo di Capodimonte) more than the altarpiece itself.

Cavallino’s multi-figure compositions that seem to date from the second half of the 1640s, such as the Procession to Calvary (Norfolk, Chrysler Museum of Art), St. Peter and the Centurion Cornelius (Rome, Palazzo Barberini) or Esther before Ahasuerus (Florence, Uffizi), show a fluent, thinner application of paint, as well as ever paler and brighter tonalities playing pale greens and blues, dull yellows, greys and beiges against accents of brilliant reds or blues. Complex arrangements of figures are constructed on interlocking diagonals of glances and gestures.

It is tempting to connect Cavallino’s splendid large Triumph of Galatea (priv. col.) with a payment made by the Prince of Cardito for an unnamed ‘large picture’ in 1649. This work develops the stylistic tendencies of the St. Cecilia, and its naturalistic depiction of the human figure is particularly refined. The single-figure images, such as the intense yet delicate Singer (late 1640s; Naples, Museo di Capodimonte) and the tender St. Catherine of Alexandria (late 1640s; University of Birmingham, Barber Institute of Fine Arts), move away from the style of Ribera and show an increasing complexity and sophistication in the observation of surfaces and the effects of light and shade.

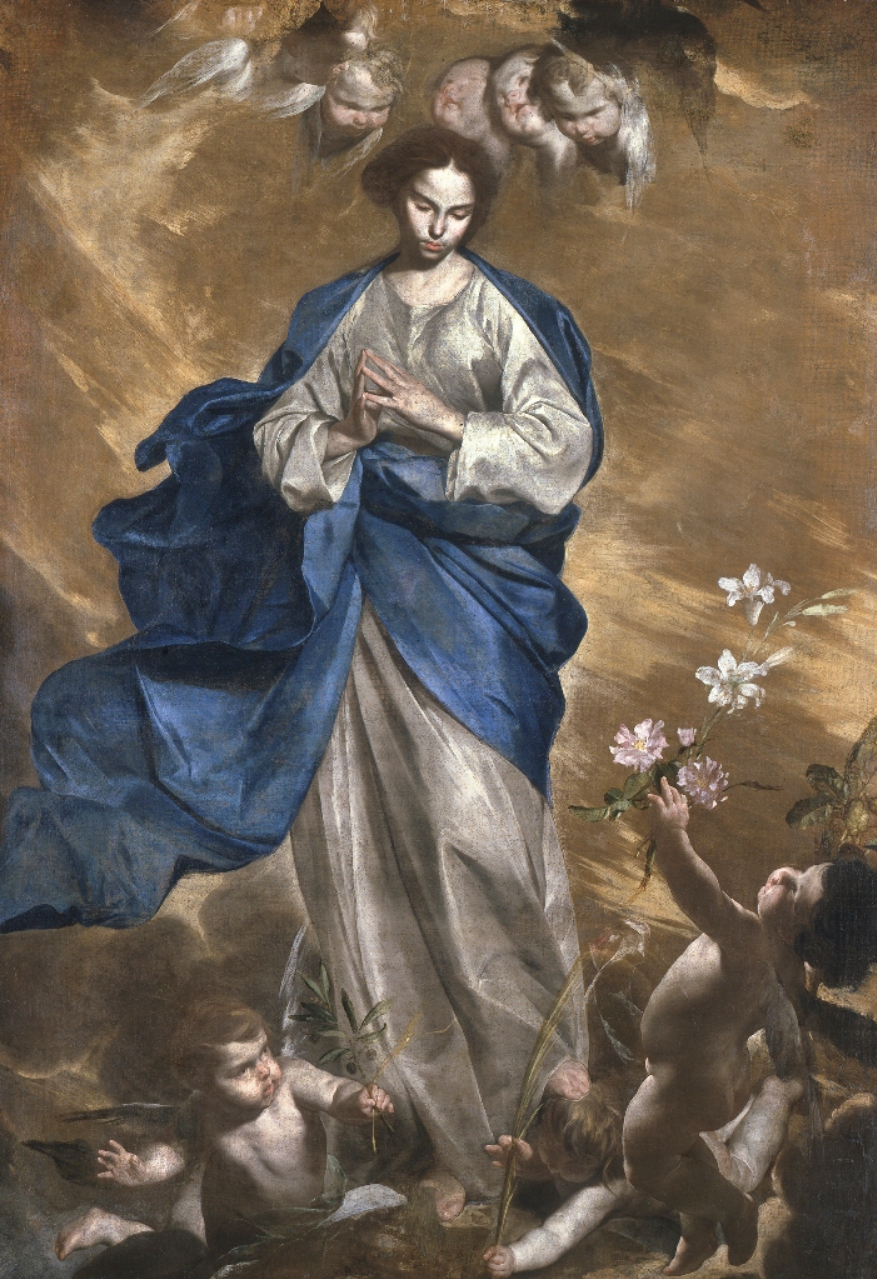
Blessed Virgin, 1650, Pinacoteca di Brera, Milan

Cavallino's masterpiece from this period is the billowing proletarian Blessed Virgin at the Brera Gallery in Milan. Passive amid the swirling, muscular putti, this Neapolitan signorina delicately rises from the fog, the updated Catholic baroque equivalent of a Botticelli's Venus.

=== Late works, 1650–1656 ===
The paintings that are considered to date from Cavallino’s last years are characterized by a new beauty and power in his rendering of human emotion through expression and gesture; most of them are intensely theatrical. To this group belong the signed Adoration of the Shepherds (c. 1650; Cleveland Museum of Art), noted for its brilliant ultramarine accents; the Meeting of David and Abigail (Brunswick, Herzog Anton Ulrich-Mus.) and its pair, the Finding of Moses (Brunswick, Herzog Anton Ulrich Museum), in which graceful figures are set in a complex, balletic composition; and a series of elegant paintings on copper showing Gaius Mucius Scaevola before Lars Porsena (Fort Worth, Kimbell Art Museum), the Expulsion of Heliodorus from the Temple (Moscow, Pushkin Museum), and the Shade of Samuel Invoked by Saul (Malibu, Getty Museum).

In these works, the latter two of which are signed, the subtly related contours, the complex effects of light, the intense naturalism of surface combined with colours by turns opaque, acid or brilliantly saturated, and the sense of dramatic composition, all of which were prefigured in Cavallino’s early maturity, come to final fruition. His other signed works are a Pietà (Molfetta, Museo Pinacoteca Salvucci) and Judith with the Head of Holofernes (Stockholm, Nationalmuseum). Cavallino may have died c. 1654, as de' Dominici maintained, or in the plague of 1656.

=== Posthumous reputation ===
De' Dominici, writing in Naples in the mid-18th century, considered Cavallino to be one of the four or five most important local painters of the first half of the 17th century. He described him as the Poussin of the Neapolitans, whose art was a mixture of Guido Reni, Rubens and Titian. Yet in the 18th and 19th centuries Cavallino’s international reputation was eclipsed, and he was not rediscovered until the early 20th century. Later scholars established for him a corpus of around 80 pictures. His art has been isolated from that of contemporary painters, such as Agostino Beltrano, Antonio de Bellis and Bartolomeo Passante, whose work is stylistically close to his. Yet the complex sources of his individuality, his pictorial and psychological sophistication and his virtuosity with the brush will probably continue to prove elusive.

== Works ==
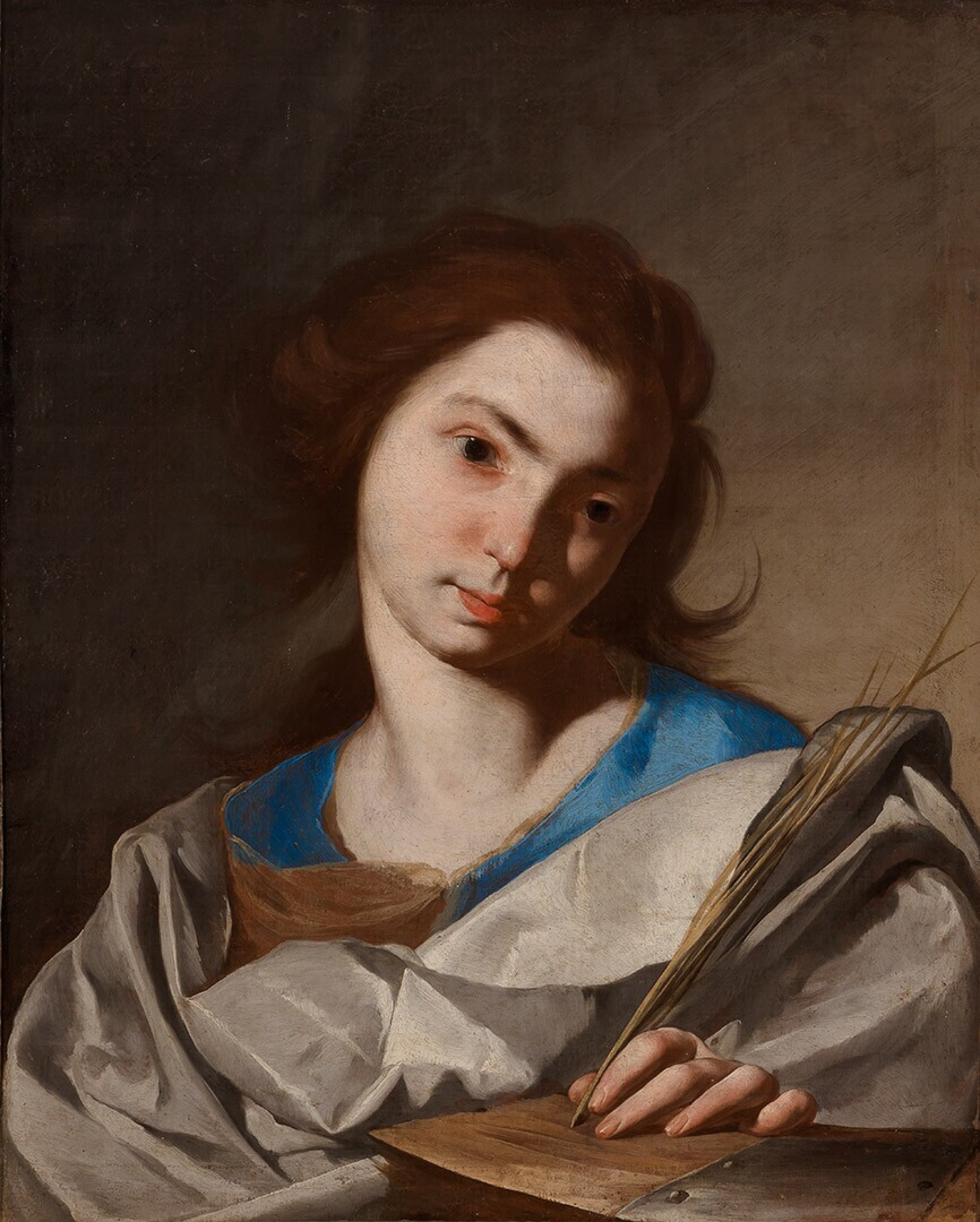
Saint Catherine of Alexandria, Museum Boijmans Van Beuningen, Rotterdam

- Meeting of Joachim and Anna at the Golden Gate of Jerusalem, Museum of Fine Arts, Budapest
- Immaculate Conception (1640), 69 cm x 45 cm, Musée des Beaux-Arts, Caen
- Immaculate Conception (1650), Brera Gallery, Milan
- The Ecstasy of Saint Cecilia, cartoon, Museo di Capodimonte, Naples
- The Ecstasy of Saint Cecilia, final work, Palazzo Vecchio, Florence
- Esther and Ahasuerus, Uffizi Gallery, Florence
- Adoration of the Magi, Kunsthistorisches Museum, Vienna
- Gaius Mucius Scaevola Confronting King Porsenna, Kimbell Art Museum, Fort Worth, Texas
- Saint John the Evangelist, Museu Nacional d'Art de Catalunya, Barcelona
- Hercules and Omphale, National Museum of Western Art, Tokyo
- Adoration of the Shepherds, Cleveland Museum of Art
- The Vision of Saint Dominic, National Gallery of Canada, Ottawa
- Lot and his Daughters, Thyssen-Bornemisza Museum, Madrid
- Virgin Annunciate (c. 1645–50), 85.5 cm x 70.0 cm, National Gallery of Victoria, Melbourne, Australia
- Woman Playing the Clavichord, Museum of Fine Arts of Lyon
- Cleansing of the Temple, National Gallery, London
Bernardo Cavallino

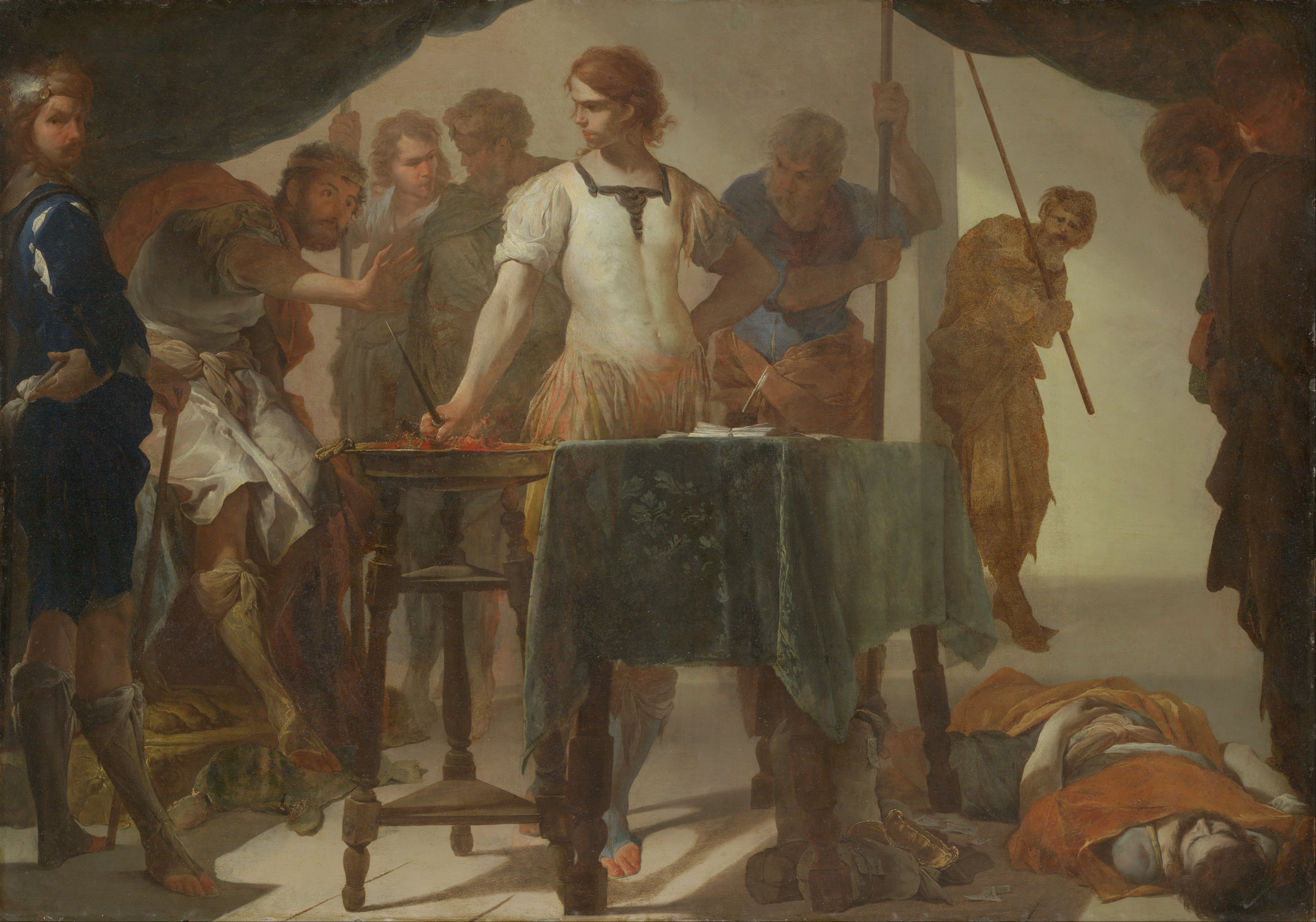
Mucius Scaevola Confronting King Porsenna, Kimbell Art Museum, Fort Worth, Texas

The Denial of St. Peter, Museo di Capodimonte, Naples

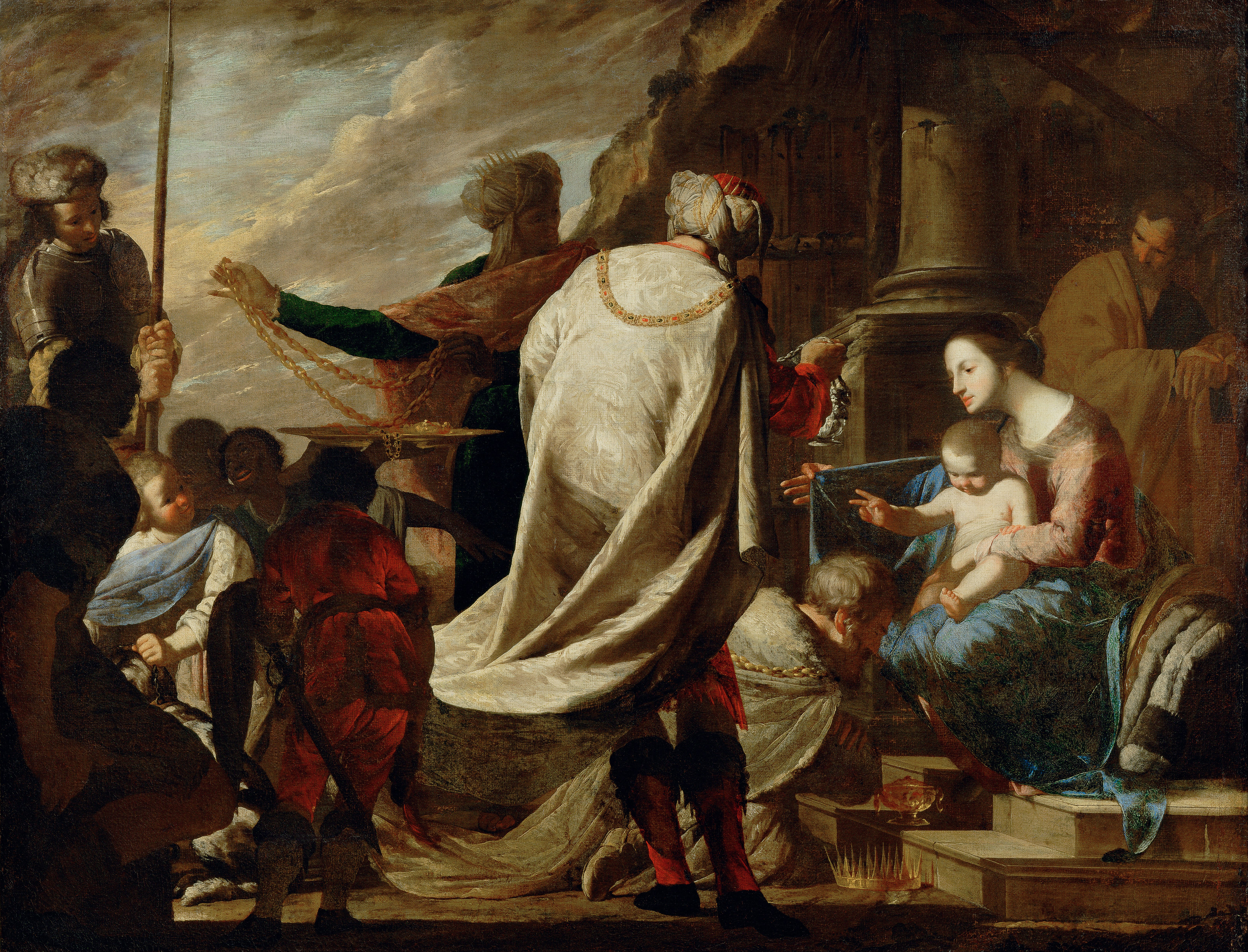
Adoration of the Magi, Kunsthistorisches Museum, Vienna

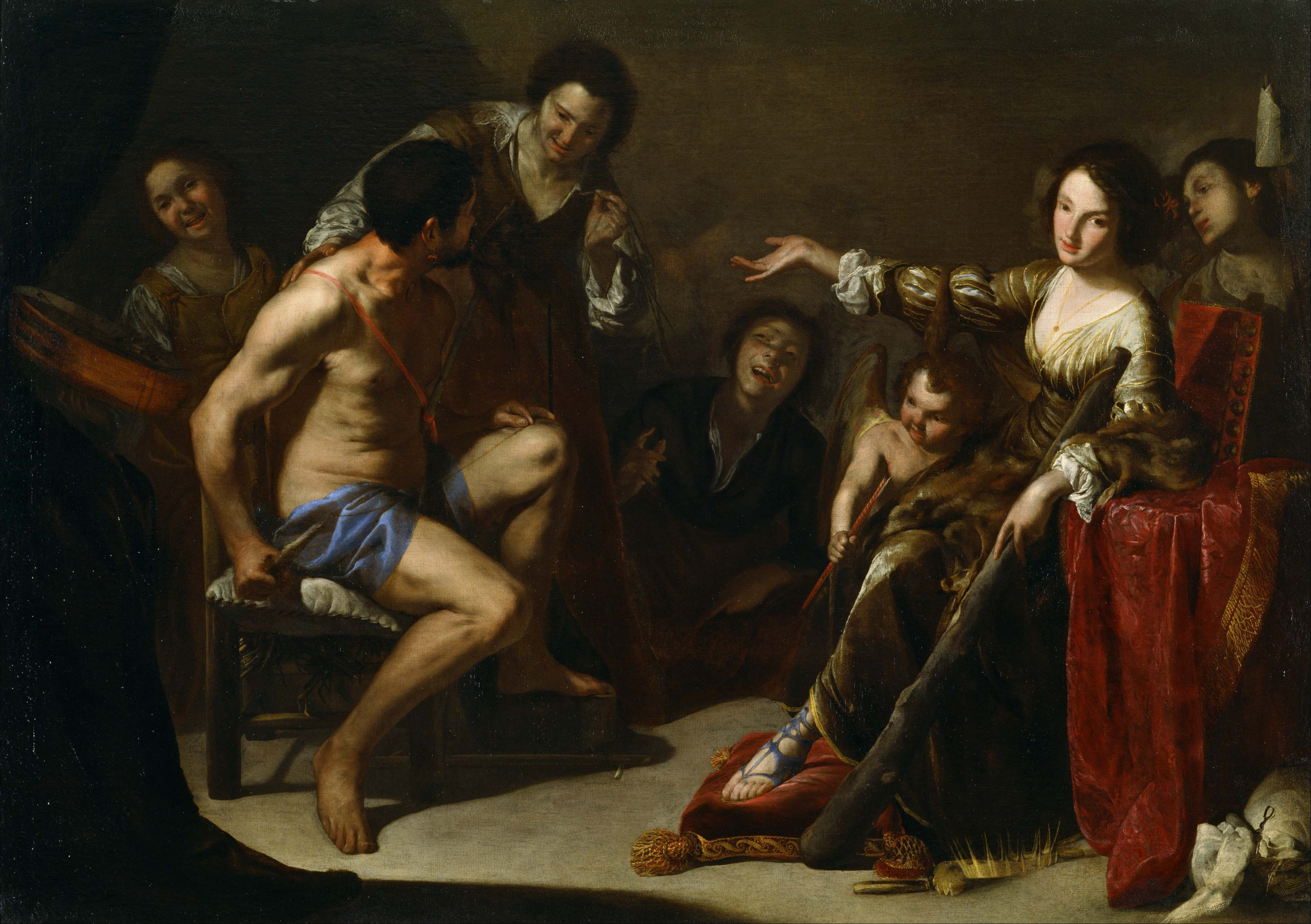
Hercules and Omphale, National Museum of Western Art, Tokyo

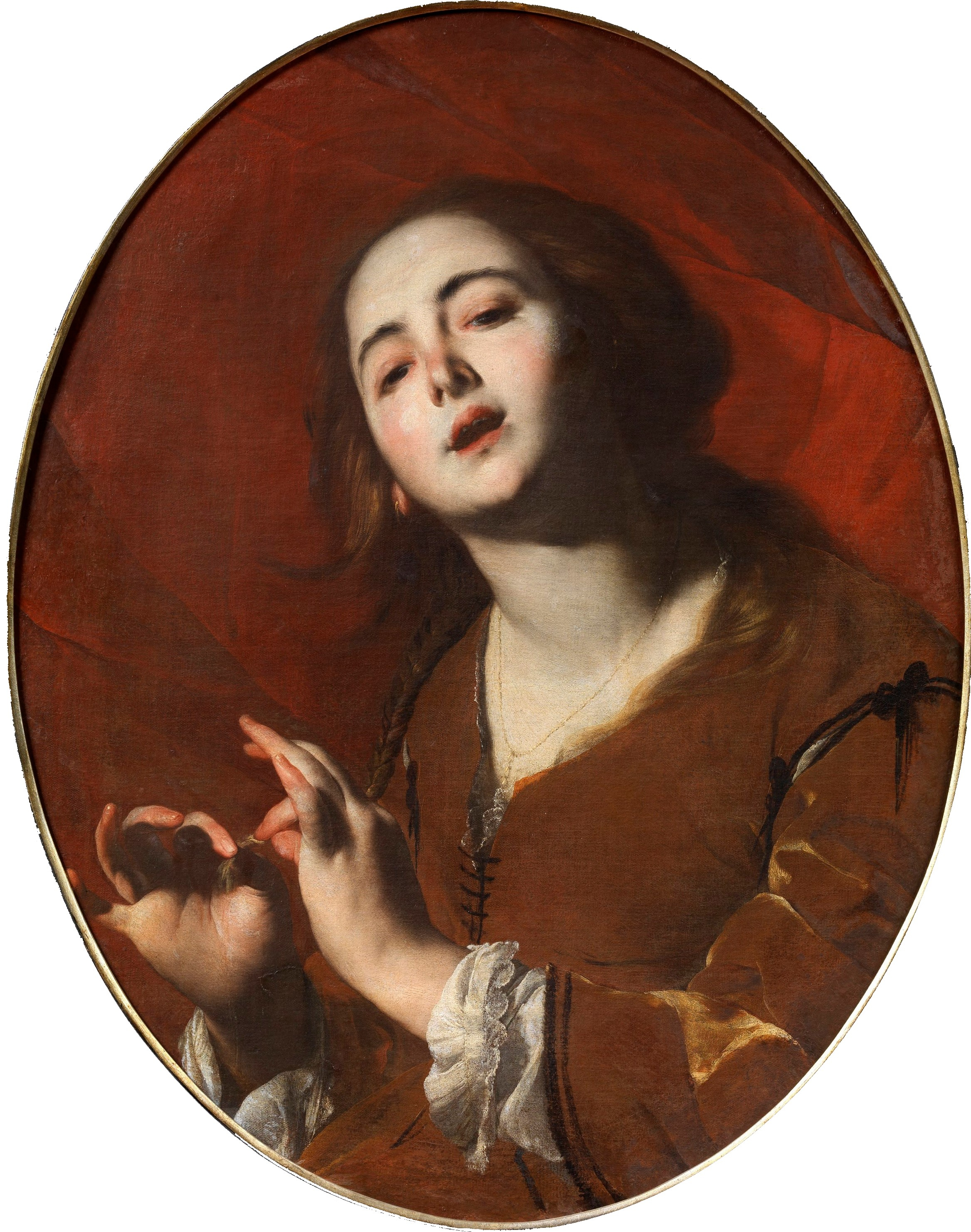
The Singer, Museo di Capodimonte, Naples

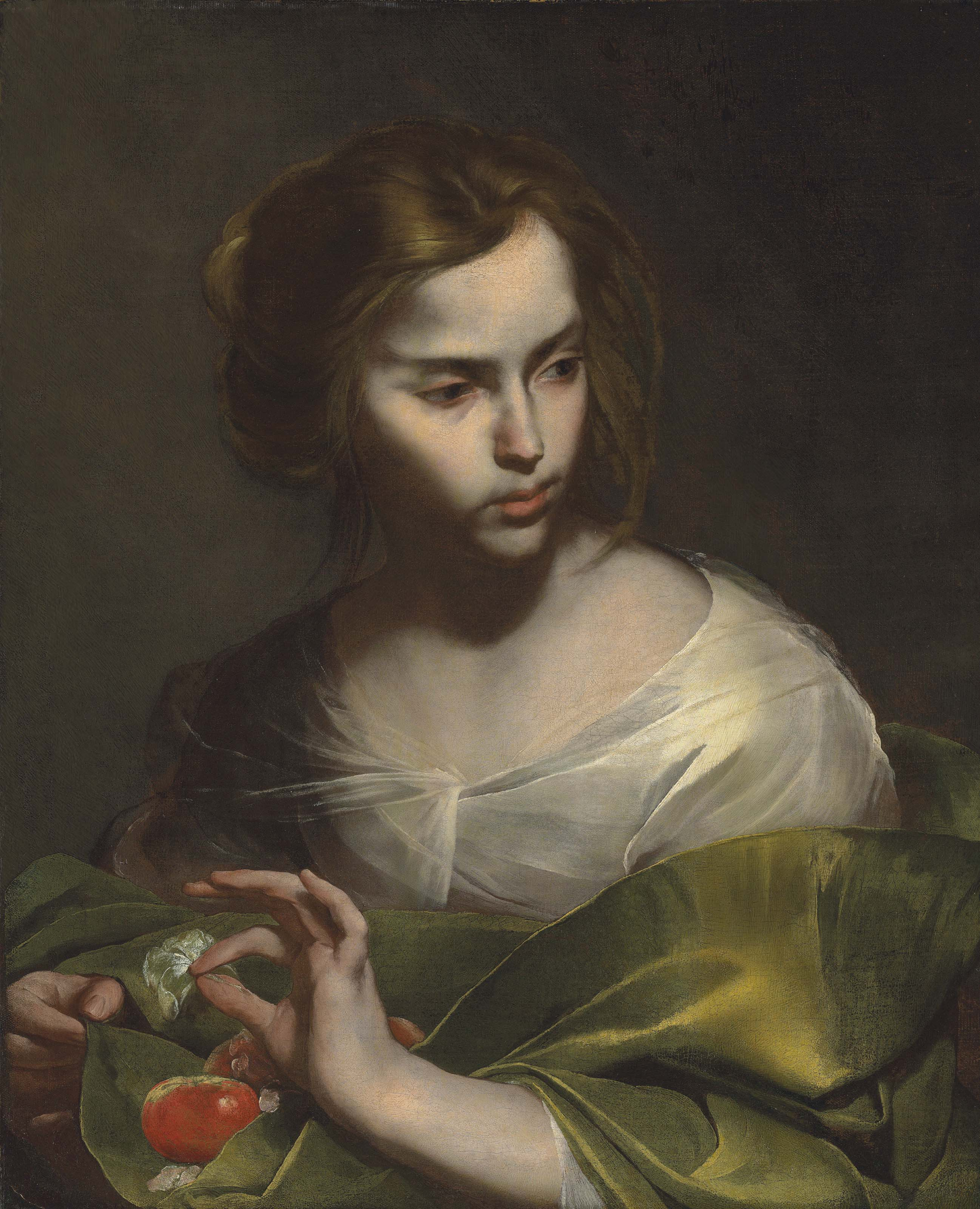
Saint Dorothy, priv. col.

Adoration of the Shepherds, Cleveland Museum of Art

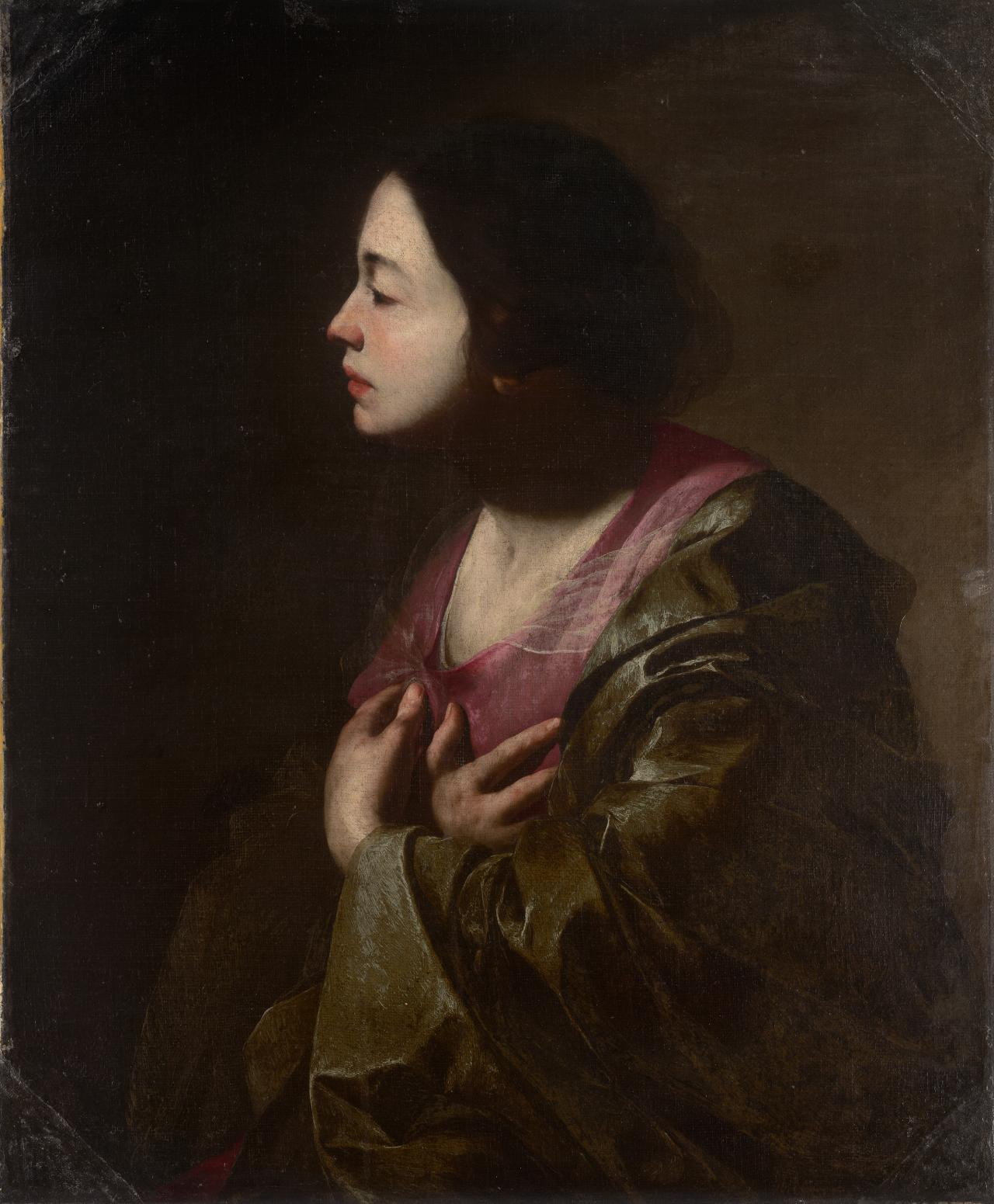
Virgin Annunciate, National Gallery of Victoria, Melbourne, Australia

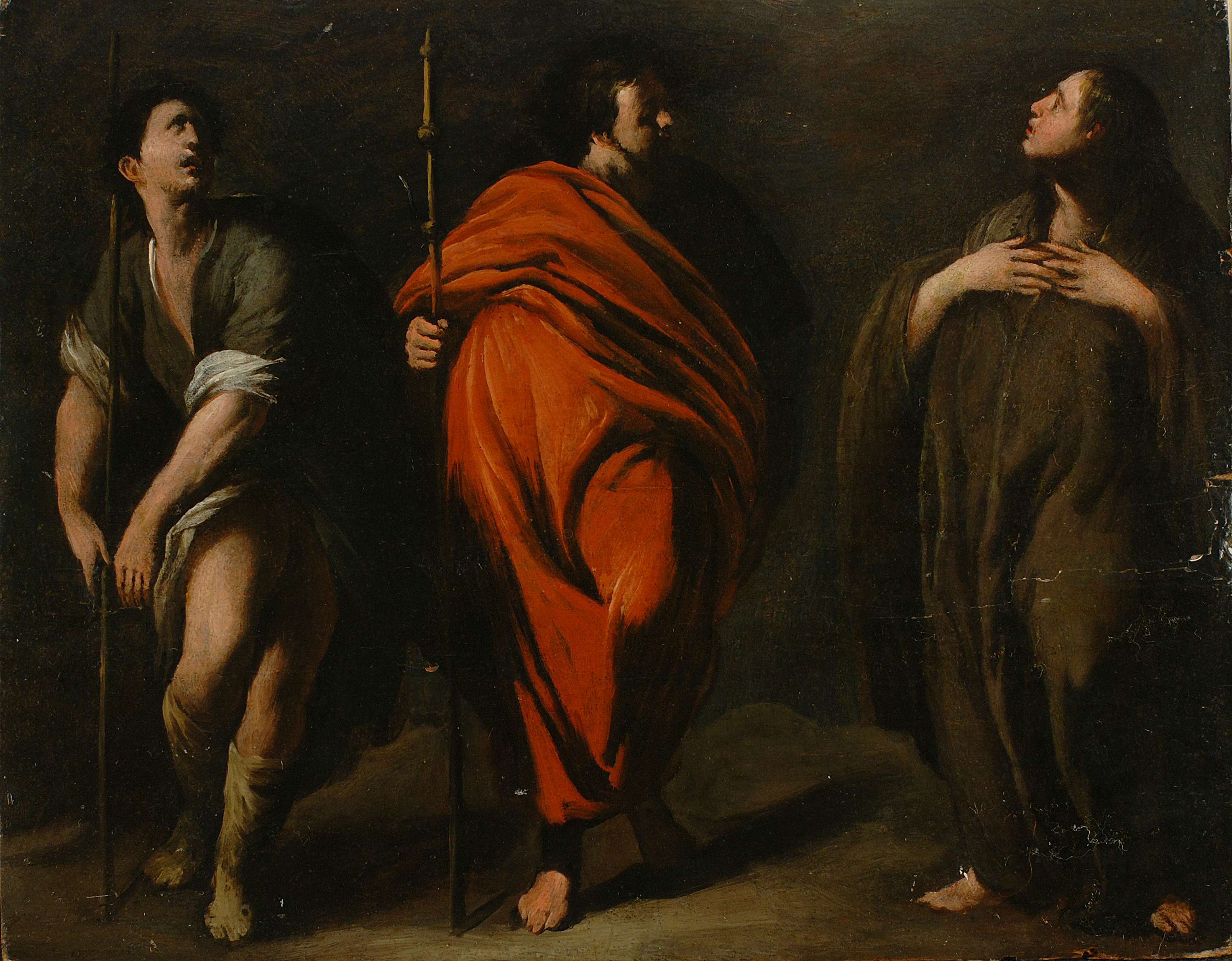
Three Standing Saints, Linares Gallery, Madrid

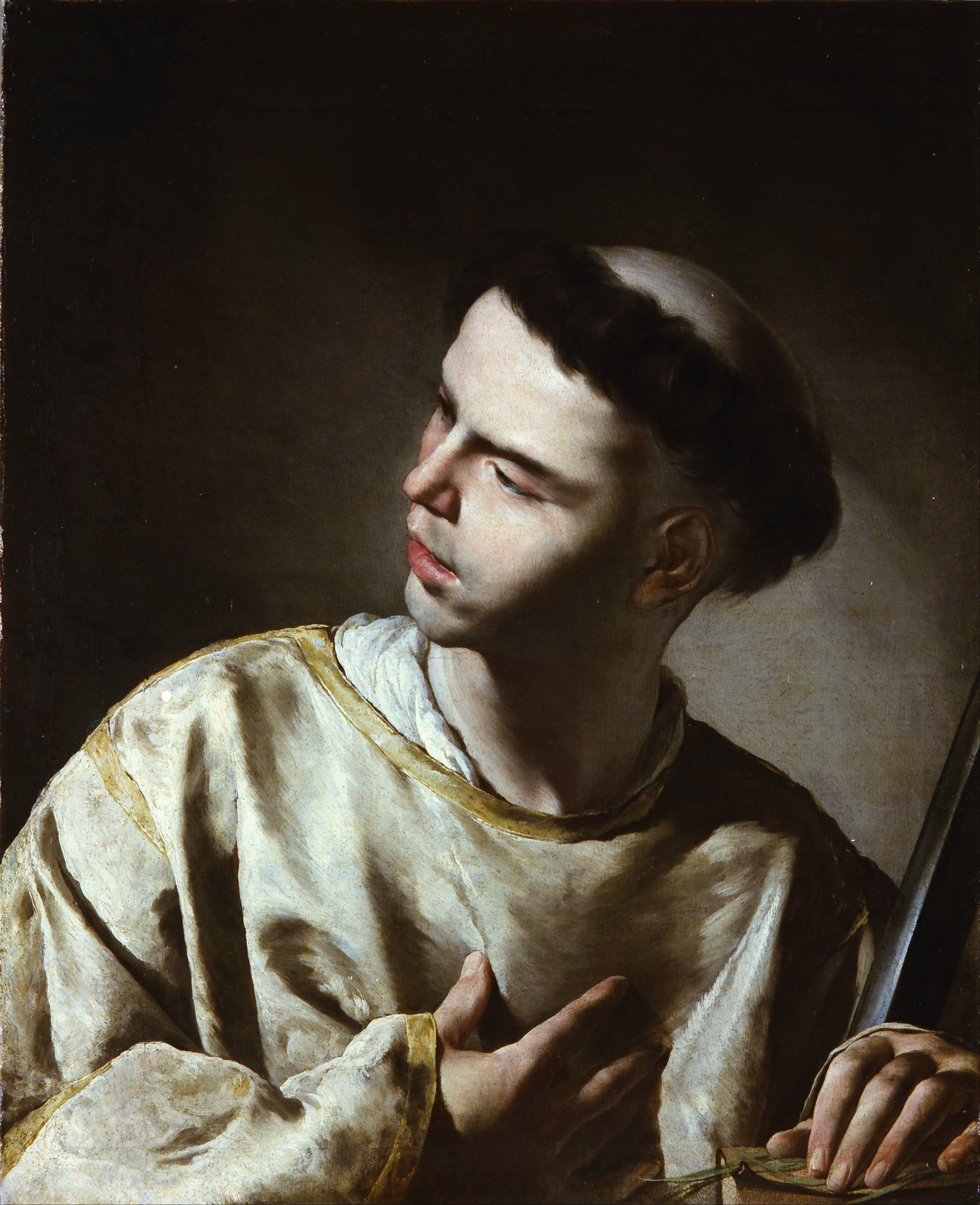
Saint Lawrence, Lázaro Galdiano Museum, Madrid

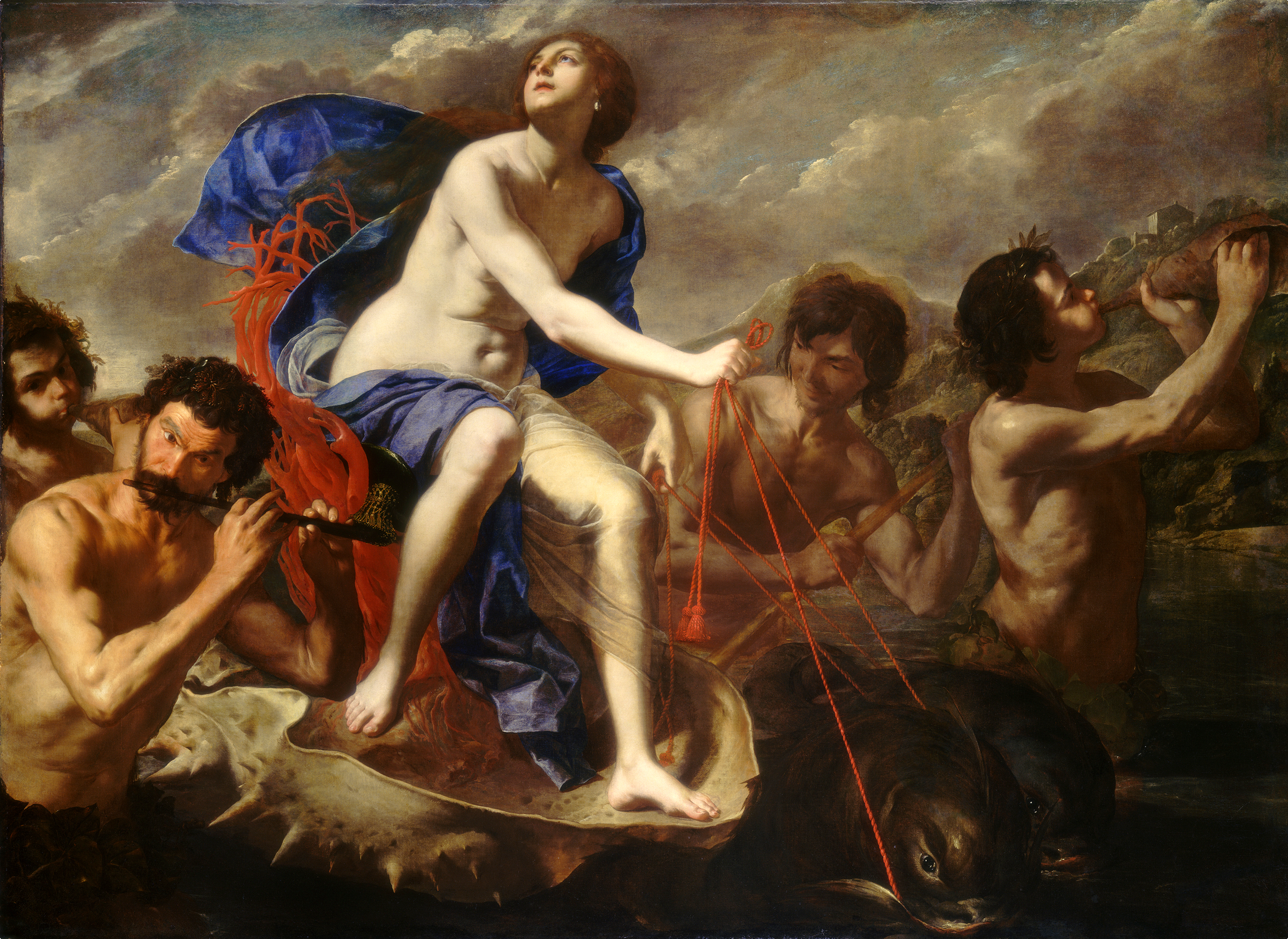
The Triumph of Galatea, National Gallery of Art, Washington, D.C.

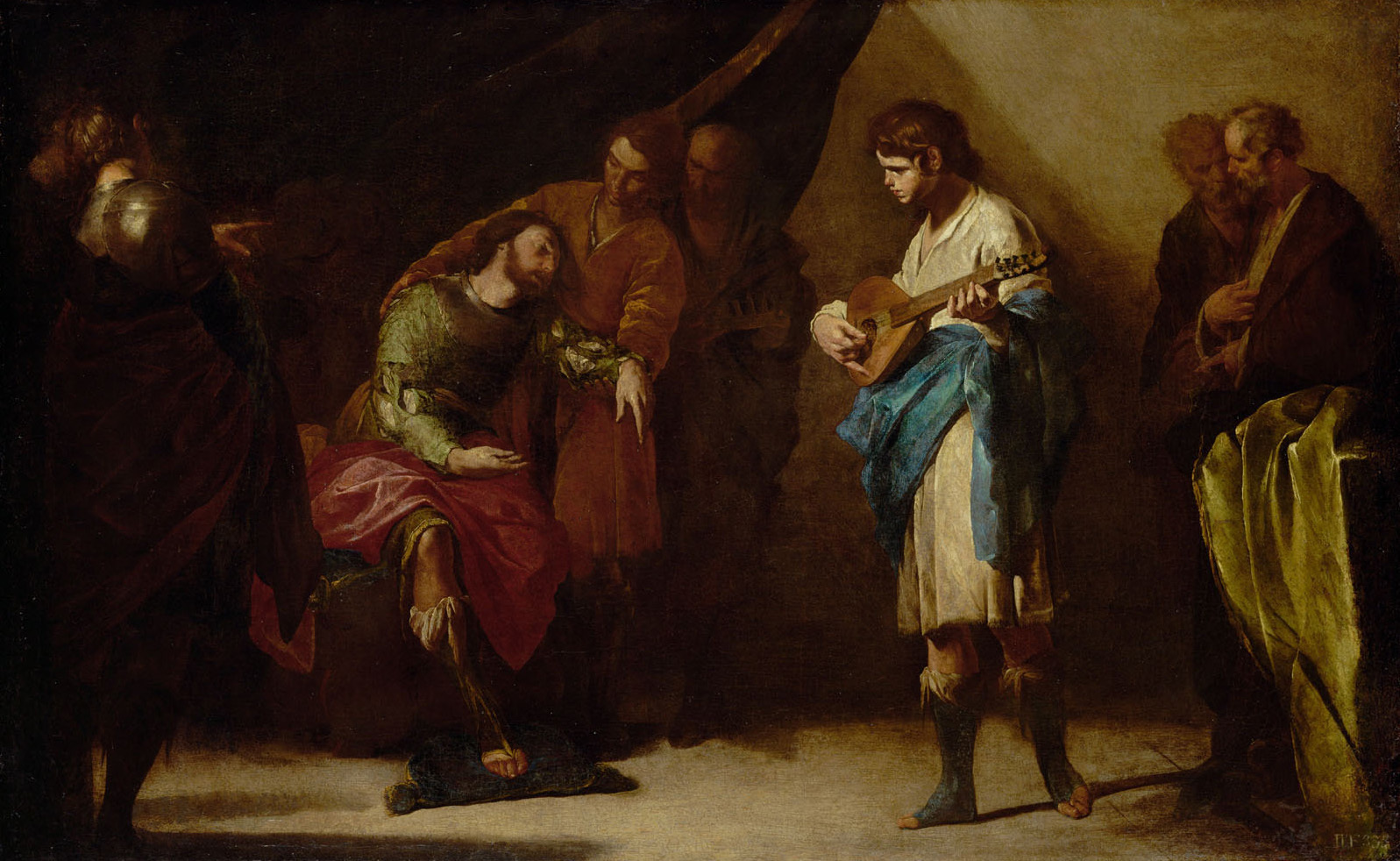
David plays before Saul, Kunsthistorisches Museum, Vienna
