= Carlo Rosa =

Italian painter (1613–1678)

Carlo Rosa (1613 – September 12, 1678) was an Italian painter.

== Biography ==
Carlo was the son of a provincial painter, Massenzio Rosa. He moved to Bitonto as a young boy, and there he had his first training until, under the patronage of the Bishop of Bitonto, Fabrizio Carafa, he moved to Naples, where during 1636 to 1641, he worked in the studio of Massimo Stanzione.

== Works ==
After working with Stanzione, Carlo traveled to Rome and then returned to Naples, where he was a follower of Mattia Preti. He also painted a St Gregory and a San Carlo Borromeo for the Church of the Santissimi Apostoli of Naples. Later in life he moved back to Bitonto, where he painted for many churches. For example, he painted the ceilings for the Church of San Nicola di Bari. Among his pupils was Francesco Antonio Altobello.
