= Francesco Antonio Altobello =

Italian painter

Francesco Antonio Altobello (1637-1703), a Neapolitan painter of the 17th century, was a scholar of Carlo di Rosa, who had studied under Massino Stanzioni. Altobello used ultramarine excessively in his pictures, which was contrary to Stanzioni's practice. He is mentioned as a man of genius, correct in drawing, of good invention, and skilful in composition.
