= Diocesan Museum (Naples) =

Coordinates: 40.85394298°N 14.25869263°E

Diocesan Museum of Naples
- Museo diocesano di Napoli
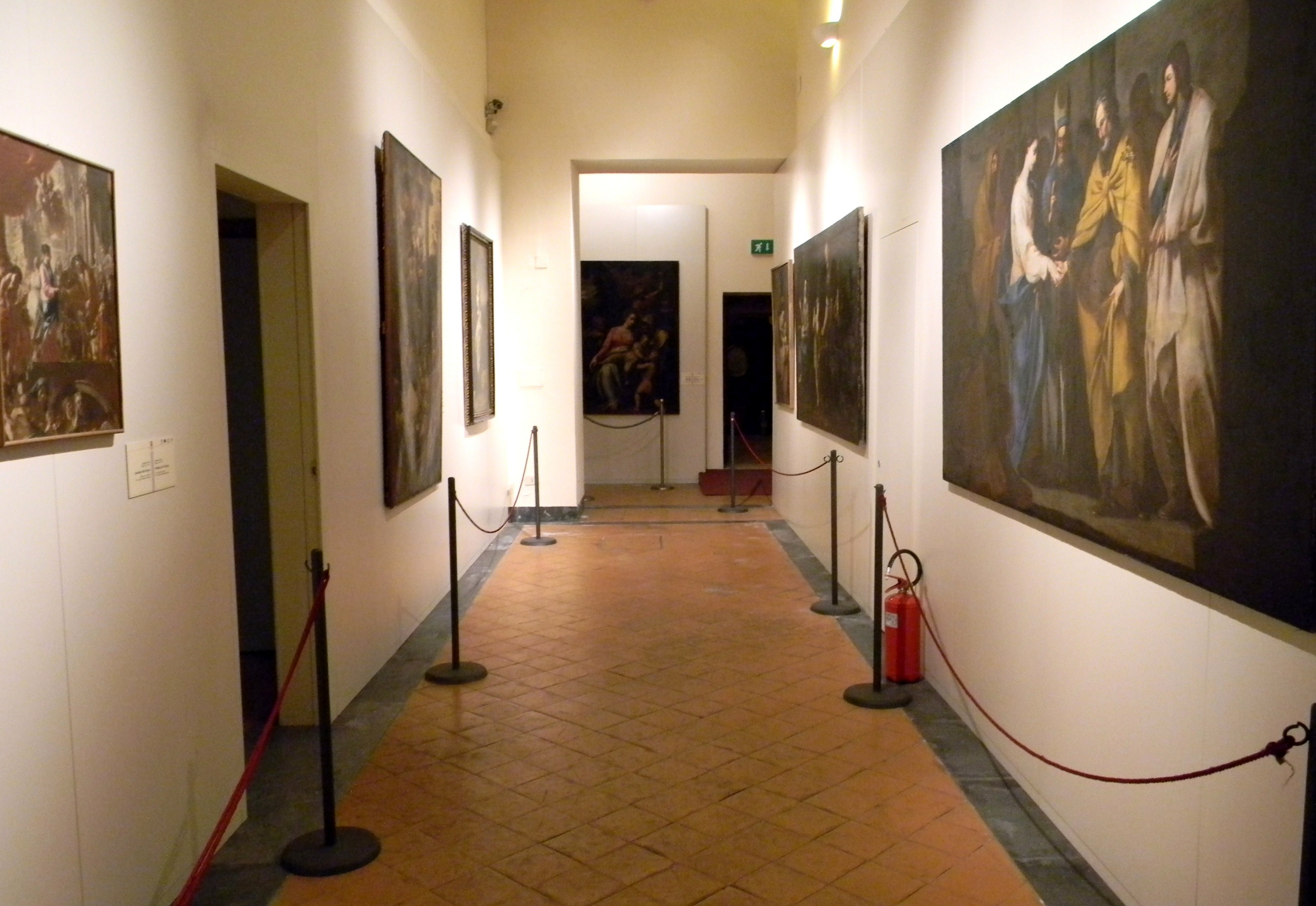
- Interior
- Established: 2007; 19 years ago
- Location: Santa Maria Donnaregina Nuova, Naples, Italy
- Type: Art museum
- Founder: Crescenzio Sepe

The Diocesan Museum is the museum of the Roman Catholic Diocese of Naples, displaying paintings, reliquaries and bronzes previously housed in the Archepiscopal Palace, closed and suppressed churches in the Diocese (such as the churches of Santa Donna Regina Nuova and the neighbouring Santa Maria Donnaregina Vecchia) or churches where it is too risky to display artworks. The paintings are mainly from the Neapolitan School, including works by Luca Giordano, Francesco Solimena, Massimo Stanzione, Aniello Falcone and Andrea Vaccaro.

It was originally housed in the Archepiscopal Palace but due to an initiative by cardinal-archbishop Crescenzio Sepe it re-opened in the rooms behind the chancel of Santa Donna Regina Nuova and on a new mezzanine floor above the side chapels of its nave on 23 October 2007. The rooms above the side chapels are organised thematically, with a room each for the Passion of Christ, the Seven Sacraments, Martyrdom, the Life of Priests, Monks and Mendicants and the Seven Works of Pity. Other rooms house objets-d'art, such as two bronzes of St Candida of Naples and St Maximus by Giovan Domenico Vinaccia from Naples Cathedral, reliquaries, vestments and sculptures in wood and stone.

Visitors can also see the neighbouring Santa Maria Donnaregina Vecchia, although this does not display any artworks from the collection. Santa Donna Regina Nuova belongs to the Ministry of the Interior's "Collection of religious buildings", whilst the City of Naples owns Santa Maria Donnaregina Vecchia. The museum is managed by the Archdiocese and supervised by the Soprintendenza al polo museale di Napoli.

== Floor plan ==
1. Passage to the warming room
2. Monks' warming room
3. Retro-altar
4. Sacristy
5. Ante-sacristy
6. Passage to the ante-sacristy
7. Hallway
8. Temporary exhibitions
9. Permanent Display - Passion of Christ and the Sacraments
10. Permanent Display - Martyrdom
11. Permanent Display - The religious life
12. Permanent Display - The religious life
13. Permanent Display - Works of Charity
14. Permanent Display - Reliquaries and precious objects
15. Permanent Display - Wooden sculpture
16. Lapidarium

Pianta

== Collections ==
=== Paintings ===
Image	Title	Artist	Room	Originally from
	Resurrection and Crucifixion	Giovanni Bernardo Lama	Passage to the warming room	Santa Maria delle Grazie a Caponapoli
	Our Lady of Graces with Saints Sophia, Francis of Assisi, Francis of Paola and Januarius	Fabrizio Santafede	Warming Room	Santa Sofia
	Our Lady of Graces with Patron Saints of Naples	Pietro Torres	Warming Room	Gesù e Maria
	Beheading of St Januarius	Mattia Preti (copy after)	Warming Room	Santa Maria dei Lanzati
	St Januarius with cardinal Alfonso Gesualdo	Giovanni Balducci	Warming Room	Naples Cathedral
-	Adoration of the Shepherds	Giuseppe Simonelli	Retro-altar	Basilica dell'Incoronata Madre del Buon Consiglio
-	Angel	Unknown, Southern Italy, late 15th or early 16th century	Retro-altar	Naples Cathedral
-	Annunciation	Dirk Hendricksz	Retro-altar	Santa Maria della Sapienza, Naples
-	Education of the Virgin	Unknown, Naples, late 18th century	Retro-altar	Basilica dell'Incoronata Madre del Buon Consiglio
-	Jesus in St Joseph's Workshop	Diana De Rosa (attr.)	Retro-altar	San Giovanni Maggiore
	Madonna	Unknown, Southern Italy, late 15th or early 16th century	Retro-altar	Naples Cathedral
	Rest on the Flight into Egypt	Aniello Falcone	Retro-altar	Naples Cathedral
-	Holy Family with a Goldfinch	Fontanarosa Master (attr.)	Retro-altar	Sant'Agnello Maggiore
-	Holy Family with the Infant St John the Baptist and St Anne	Santillo Sannini (attr.)	Retro-altar	San Giovanni Battista delle Monache
-	Holy Family with the Infant St John the Baptist and St Elizabeth	Unknown, Emilia, 1550-1599	Retro-altar	San Gennaro
-	Betrothal of the Virgin	Diana De Rosa (attr.)	Retro-altar	San Giovanni Maggiore
-	Betrothal of the Virgin	Lorenzo de Caro	Retro-altar	Archepiscopal Palace
-	Our Lady of the Immaculate Conception with Saints Francis of Assisi, Clare, Rose of Viterbo, Anthony of Padua, Bonaventure and Louis of Toulouse	Francesco Solimena and Nicola Maria Rossi	Sacristy	San Francesco alle Cappuccinelle
-	Enthroned Madonna and Child with an Angel	Pietro di Domenico da Montepulciano (attr.)	Sacristy	Duomo
	Madonna and Child	Pietro Negroni (attr.)	Sacristy	Archepiscopal Palace
.	Madonna and Child	Massimo Stanzione	Sacristy	Donnaregina Nuova (now in a private collection)
	Madonna and Child with Saints James and Christopher	Decio Tramontano and unknown assistant	Sacristy	Santa Maria Ancillarum
-	Madonna of the Rosary with Souls in Purgatory	Antonio De Bellis	Sacristy	Santa Maria di Portosalvo
	Madonna of Succour with Saints Patricia and Catherine of Alexandria; with predella showing: Nativity, Ascension of Christ, Pentecost and Death of the Virgin	Unknown, Naples, early 16th century	Sacristy	San Gennaro al Vomero
-	Madonna with Saints John the Evangelist and Paul	Micco Spadaro	Sacristy	Santa Maria Donnaromita
-	Madonna in Glory with Saints John the Baptist and Francis of Assisi	Teodoro d'Errico	Sacristy	Santa Maria della Vita
-	Virgin Mary Interceding for Souls in Purgatory	Andrea Vaccaro	Sacristy	Santa Maria del Pianto
-	Adoration of the Magi	Marco Pino	Ante-Sacristy	Sant'Antoniello
-	Assumption of the Virgin	Silvestro Buono	Ante-Sacristy	San Pietro in Vincoli
-	Presentation in the Temple with Saints Cosmas and Damian	Antonio Rimpatta da Bologna (attr.)	Ante-Sacristy	Santi Cosma e Damiano ai Banchi Nuovi
	Crucifixion with the Virgin Mary, St John the Evangelist, St Peter, St Sophia and Capuchin monks	Marco Pino	Passage to the ante-sacresty	Santa Sofia
-	Saint John the Evangelist and cardinal Innico Caracciolo	Francesco Solimena	Hallway	Gesù delle Monache
-	Saint Agnello	Giovanni Balducci	Temporary Exhibitions Space	Naples Cathedral
	Saint Pasquale Baylon's Vision of the Monstrance	Unknown, 18th century	Permanent Displays - Passion and Sacraments	Archepiscopal Palace
-	Christ Washing the Disciples' Feet	Unknown, 18th century	Permanent Displays - Passion and Sacraments	Basilica dell'Incoronata Madre del Buon Consiglio
	Baptism of Christ	Giovanni Bernardo Lama	Permanent Displays - Passion and Sacraments	Santa Restituta
	Lament over the Dead Christ	Andrea Vaccaro	Permanent Displays - Passion and Sacraments	Archepiscopal Palace
	Crucifixion with Mary Magdalene	Unknown, Naples, 17th century	Permanent Displays - Passion and Sacraments	Archepiscopal Palace
	The Risen Christ Appearing to the Apostles	Unknown follower of Mattia Preti (17th and 18th centuries)	Permanent Displays - Passion and Sacraments	Archepiscopal Palace
	Crucifixion	Unknown, Southern Italy, late 15th or early 16th century	Permanent Displays - Passion and Sacraments	Naples Cathedral
	Glory of the Most High	Lorenzo de Caro (attr.)	Permanent Displays - Passion and Sacraments	Basilica dell'Incoronata Madre del Buon Consiglio
	Saint Peter Meeting Saint Paul in Rome Before Their Martyrdom	Unknown, Naples, 18th century	Permanent Displays - Martyrdom	Chiesa di Gesù e Maria
	Martyrdom of Saint Bartholomew	Andrea Vaccaro	Permanent Displays - Martyrdom	Monastero di Sant'Eframo Nuovo
	Martyrdom of St Stephen	Master of the Martyrdoms, 1600-1650	Permanent Displays - Martyrdom	Basilica dell'Incoronata Madre del Buon Consiglio
-	St Januarius	Francesco Solimena (attr.)	Permanent Displays - Martyrdom	Archepiscopal Palace
	St Paul	Unknown, Caravaggisti school, 1600-1625	Permanent Displays - Martyrdom	Santa Maria Donnaromita
	St Peter	Unknown, Caravaggisti school, 1600-1625	Permanent Displays - Martyrdom	Santa Maria Donnaromita
	Saint Irene Caring For Saint Sebastian	Paolo De Matteis	Permanent Displays - Martyrdom	Santa Maria della Vita
-	Female saint praying	Unknown, Naples, 1625-1650	Permanent Displays - Martyrdom	Santa Maria dell'Aiuto
	Saint Agnese	Giacomo del Po	Permanent Displays - Martyrdom	Basilica dell'Incoronata Madre del Buon Consiglio
	Massacre of the Innocents	Pacecco De Rosa (attr)	Permanent Displays - Martyrdom	Basilica dell'Incoronata Madre del Buon Consiglio
	Head of Saint Anastasius	"Tr" monogramatist, mid 17th century	Permanent Displays - Martyrdom	Archepiscopal Palace
	Saint Benedict and His Life	Unknown, Naples, 1425-1475	Permanent Displays - Religious Life	San Gennaro al Vomero
	St Jerome	Unknown, Southern Italy, late 15th or early 16th century	Permanent Displays - Religious Life	San Gennaro al Vomero
	Saint Anthony the Great	Unknown, Southern Italy, late 15th or early 16th century	Permanent Displays - Religious Life	Naples Cathedral
	Saint Jerome with the Angel	Agostino Beltrano	Permanent Displays - Religious Life	Santa Maria della Verità
	Baptism of St Augustine	Luca Giordano	Permanent Displays - Religious Life	Sant'Anna al Trivio
	St Augustine’s Vision	Luca Giordano	Permanent Displays - Religious Life	Sant'Anna al Trivio
	Madonna del Carmine	Unknown, Naples, late 16th century	Permanent Displays - Religious Life	Basilica dell'Incoronata Madre del Buon Consiglio
	Madonna of the Rosary with Saints Dominic and Catherine	Andrea Vaccaro	Permanent Displays - Religious Life	Basilica dell'Incoronata Madre del Buon Consiglio
	Madonna of the Rosary with Saints Dominic and Catherine	Sebastiano Conca	Permanent Displays - Religious Life	Archepiscopal Palace
	Madonna of the Rosary with Saints Dominic and Rosa	Evangelista Schiano	Permanent Displays - Religious Life	Santa Maria delle Grazie a Caponapoli
	Madonna of the Rosary with Saints Vincenzo Ferreri and Rose of Lima	Unknown, 18th century	Permanent Displays - Religious Life	Basilica dell'Incoronata Madre del Buon Consiglio
-	The Virgin Mary Giving the Habit to the Founder Saints of the Order of the Servants of Mary	Nicola Maria Rossi (copy after)	Permanent Displays - Religious Life	Basilica dell'Incoronata Madre del Buon Consiglio
-	The Death of St Dominic	Unknown, Naples, 19th century	Permanent Displays - Religious Life	Archepiscopal Palace
	Saint Francis of Paola	Unknown, Naples, 18th century	Permanent Displays - Religious Life	Basilica dell'Incoronata Madre del Buon Consiglio
	Saint Francis of Paola	Unknown, Naples, 1600-1650	Permanent Displays - Religious Life	Santa Restituta
	Saint Francis Receiving the Stigmata	Lorenzo de Caro	Permanent Displays - Religious Life	Archepiscopal Palace
-	St Teresa of Avila’s Vision of St Peter of Alcàntara	Unknown, 18th century	Permanent Displays - Religious Life	Archepiscopal Palace
	Saint Anthony of Padua with the Christ Child	Unknown, Naples, 17th century	Permanent Displays - Religious Life	Archepiscopal Palace
-	Saint Anthony of Padua At Prayer	Andrea Vaccaro	Permanent Displays - Religious Life	Archepiscopal Palace
-	Saint Anthony of Padua At Prayer	Ignoto pittore napoletano (secolo XVIII)	Permanent Displays - Religious Life	Archepiscopal Palace
-	St William of Aquitaine’s Vision	Domenico Antonio Vaccaro	Permanent Displays - Religious Life	Santa Maria della Verità
-	Angels Holding a Mitre	Luca Giordano	Permanent Displays - Religious Life	Girolamini
-	Madonna and Child with Saints Anthony the Great and Filippo Neri	Paolo De Matteis	Permanent Displays - Religious Life	Naples Cathedral
	St Filippo Neri’s Vision of the Virgin Mary	Pietro Grasso, 1750-1799	Permanent Displays - Religious Life	Basilica dell'Incoronata Madre del Buon Consiglio
-	The Virgin Mary Presenting the Christ Child to St Ignatius of Loyola	Giacomo del Po	Permanent Displays - Religious Life	Archepiscopal Palace
-	Saint Cajetan Presenting the Rule of the Order	Tommaso de Vivo	Permanent Displays - Religious Life	Archepiscopal Palace
-	Saint Cajetan and the Holy Family	Unknown, Naples, 18th century	Permanent Displays - Religious Life	Basilica dell'Incoronata Madre del Buon Consiglio
	St Camillus de Lellis	Unknown, Naples, 18th century	Permanent Displays - Religious Life	Archepiscopal Palace
-	Works of Charity – Burying the Dead	Unknown, Southern Italy, 20th century	Permanent Displays - Works of Charity	Basilica di Santa Maria a Pugliano
-	Works of Corporeal Charity	Aniello Laudisello	Permanent Displays - Works of Charity	Basilica di Santa Maria a Pugliano
	Posthumous Portrait of Umberto d'Ormont, Archbishop of Naples	Lello da Orvieto (attr.)	Permanent Displays – Precious Objects and Reliquaries	Archepiscopal Palace

=== Sculptures ===
Image	Title	Artist	Room	Originally from
-	Crucifixion	Unknown, 14th century	Passage to the warming room	Santa Maria Donnaregina Vecchia
	Guardian Angel	Nicola Fumo	Warming Room	San Giovanni Battista delle Monache
-	St Joseph and the Christ Child	Nicola Fumo	Warming Room	San Giovanni Battista delle Monache
-	St Michael the Archangel	Nicola Fumo	Warming Room	San Giovanni Battista delle Monache
	St Nicolas of Bari	Nicola Fumo	Warming Room	San Giovanni Battista delle Monache
	Giovan Battista Loffredo	Girolamo D'Auria	Warming Room	Santa Maria Donnaregina Vecchia
	Effigies	School of Girolamo D'Auria	Warming Room	Santa Maria Donnaregina Vecchia
	Tondo of the Madonna and Child	Tommaso Malvito and workshop	Warming Room	Santa Maria Donnaregina Vecchia
	Tondo of the Madonna and Child	Girolamo D'Auria and workshop	Warming Room	Santa Maria Donnaregina Vecchia
-	Tondo of St Anne and the Virgin Mary as a Child	Unknown, Naples, 18th century	Warming Room	Santa Maria Donnaregina Vecchia
	Funerary Monument of Carlo Loffredo	Girolamo D'Auria and workshop	Warming Room	Santa Maria Donnaregina Vecchia
	Funerary Monument of Cesare Loffredo	Girolamo D'Auria and workshop	Warming Room	Santa Maria Donnaregina Vecchia
	Ippolita Brancaccio	Girolamo D'Auria and workshop	Warming Room	Santa Maria Donnaregina Vecchia
	Immaculate Conception	Nicola Ingaldo (attr.)	Retro-altar	Naples Cathedral
	Saint Paul	Giovan Domenico Vinaccia	Passage to the ante-sacristy	Naples Cathedral
	Carved wooden reliefs of St Augustine and St Thomas of Villanova	Giuseppe Picano	Religious Life Room	Sant'Agostino alla Zecca
-	Fragment of a pluteus with griffins in marble	Unknown, Campania, early 11th century	Lapidarium	Naples Cathedral
-	Fragment of a marble sarcophagus	Unknown, 200-400	Lapidarium	Naples Cathedral
-	Front of a marble sarcophagus	Unknown, Naples, mid 14th century	Lapidarium	Naples Cathedral
-	Altar front or pluteus in marble	Unknown, Campania, late 9th or early 10th century	Lapidarium	Naples Cathedral
	Coat of arms of Forcella in marble;	Unknown, Naples, 16th century	Lapidarium	Naples Cathedral
-	Head of the Christ Child on a fragment of a marble and stone bust	Unknown, Campania, 15th century	Lapidarium	Santissima Annunziata Maggiore
-	Head of the Virgin Mary in stone	Unknown, Campania, 15th century	Lapidarium	Santissima Annunziata Maggiore
-	Cinerary urn in marble	Unknown, 1st century	Lapidarium	Naples Cathedral
-	Reliquary vase in marble	Unknown	Lapidarium	Naples Cathedral
-	St Francis Xavier Converting the Native Americans, in carved and painted wood	Unknown, Naples, c.1820	Wooden Sculptures Room	Archepiscopal Palace
-	St Joseph with the Christ Child in carved and painted wood	Collaborator of Giacomo Colombo, c.1730	Wooden Sculptures Room	Archepiscopal Palace
	Head from a Crucifix in carved and painted wood	Unknown, late 15th century	Wooden Sculptures Room	Basilica dell'Incoronata Madre del Buon Consiglio

=== Metalwork and reliquaries ===
Image	Title	Artist	Room	Originally from
-	Altar cross in silver	Unknown, mid 18th century	Hallway	Naples Cathedral
-	Pitcher and basin in silver	Luigi De Michelis	Precious Objects and Reliquaries Room	Archepiscopal Palace
-	Pitcher and basin in gilded silver	Various, 18th century	Precious Objects and Reliquaries Room	Naples Cathedral
-	Chalice in silver and sapphires	Unknown, Naples, 1750-1775	Precious Objects and Reliquaries Room	Archepiscopal Palace
	Copy of a reliquary in silver and wood	Unknown, mid 18th century	Precious Objects and Reliquaries Room	Archepiscopal Palace
	Monstrance in silver	Unknown, Naples, pre- 1754	Precious Objects and Reliquaries Room	Naples Cathedral
-	Cooking service in gilded silver	Giacinto Buonacquisto (late 18th century)	Precious Objects and Reliquaries Room	Naples Cathedral
-	Pyx in silver, gold and sapphires	Unknown, late 18th century	Precious Objects and Reliquaries Room	Naples Cathedral
	Bust of St Maximus in silver	Giovan Domenico Vinaccia	Precious Objects and Reliquaries Room	Naples Cathedral
	Bust of St Candida of Naples in silver	Giovan Domenico Vinaccia	Precious Objects and Reliquaries Room	Naples Cathedral
	Cross-shaped reliquary of St Leonzius	Unknown, Palermo, Naples or southern Italy, 1150-1200, 1200-1299 and 1450-1499	Precious Objects and Reliquaries Room	Naples Cathedral
	Reliquary bust of St Restituta in wood, gold and paint	Unknown, Naples, 1600-1650	Wooden Sculptures Room	Santa Restituta
	St Lucy	Unknown, Naples, 1600-1650	Wooden Sculptures Room	Sant'Agostino alla Zecca
	St Apollonia in wood	Unknown, Naples, early 17th century	Wooden Sculptures Room	Sant'Agostino alla Zecca

=== Other ===
Image	Title	Artist	Room	Originally from
-	Collar of St Vincenzo Ferreri	Various, 19th and 20th centuries	Retro-altar	Santa Maria della Sanità
-	Mitre in white silk	Unknown, Naples, 1925-1950	Precious Objects and Reliquaries Room	Naples Cathedral
-	Globe	Unknown, Naples, early 18th century	Precious Objects and Reliquaries Room	Archepiscopal Palace
-	Stole	Unknown, Italian, 1550-1599	Precious Objects and Reliquaries Room	Archepiscopal Palace
