= Evangelista Schiano =

Italian painter

Evangelista Schiano (active 1755 to 1776–1777) was an Italian painter, mainly of sacred subjects.

== Biography ==
He was a pupil of Francesco Solimena. Little is known of his biography. Among his works is a Madonna of the Rosary with Saints Dominic and Rosa of Lima (signed and dated 1755), once found in the church of Santa Maria delle Grazie a Caponapoli. He painted a Madonna and Dominican Saints (signed, 1756) once found in the sacristy of the church of Donnaromita. He painted a San Niccolò e San Basilio (1760) once in the chapel of the choir of San Nicola alla Dogana. He painted frescoes depicting the Glory of St Benedict (1760) for the chapel of the chapter of the Camaldoli, and a Madonna gives the girdle to Santa Monica (signed and dated 1763) for the church of Sant’Agostino alla Zecca. The latter church has a fresco of San Nicola and Sant’Apollonia attributed to Schiano, and two deteriorated canvases of St Luke painting the Virgin and the Charity of St Augustine (1762). He painted two canvases (1769) for the church of Santa Maria di Portosalvo and in its burial ground, a St Lazarus next to the main altar. He painted a Crucifixion (1776) found on the right of the main altar of the church of San Francesco d’Assisi in Forio d’Ischia.
