= San Giovanni Maggiore, Naples =

Church in Naples, Italy

Basilica of San Giovanni Maggiore Basilica di San Giovanni Maggiore (in Italian)
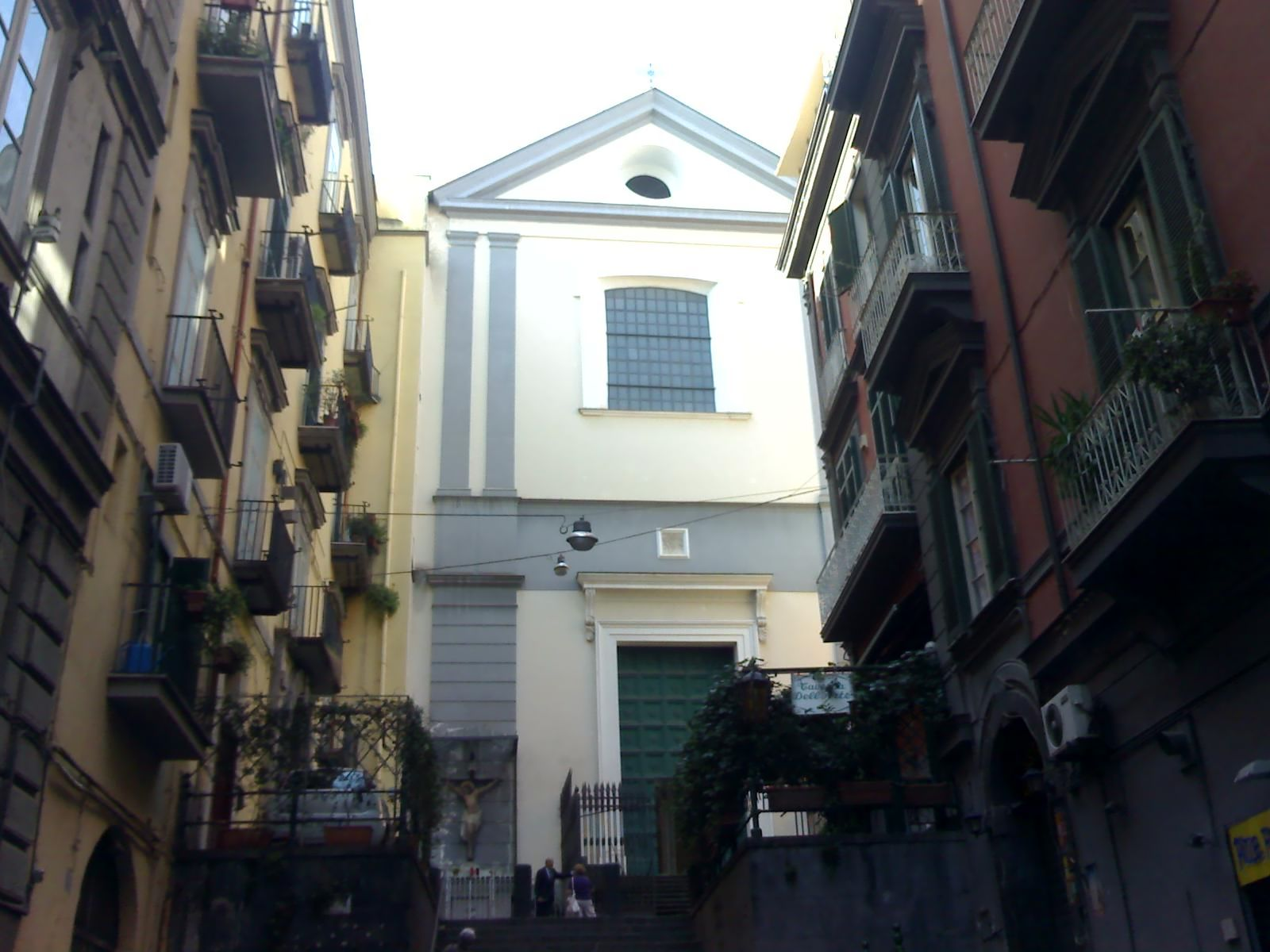
- Façade of San Giovanni Maggiore.

Religion
- Affiliation: Roman Catholic
- Diocese: Archdiocese of Naples
- Ecclesiastical or organizational status: Minor basilica

Location
- Location: Naples, Campania, Italy
- Interactive map of Basilica of San Giovanni Maggiore; Basilica di San Giovanni Maggiore (in Italian)
- Coordinates: 40.845464°N 14.255520°E

Architecture
- Type: Church

The Basilica of San Giovanni Maggiore is a church in Largo San Giovanni Maggiore in central Naples, Italy.

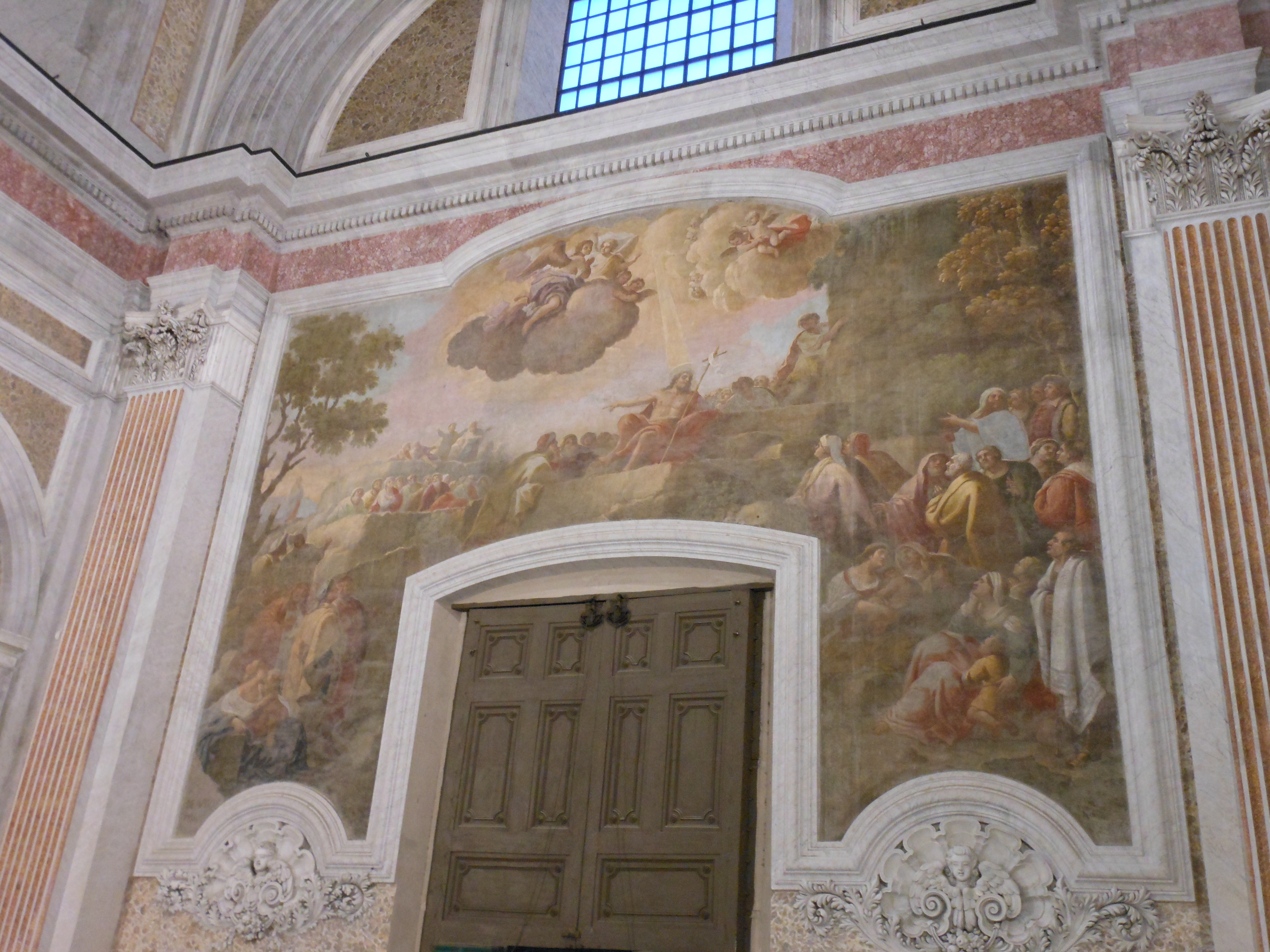
Counterfacade

A 4th-century church at the site was likely erected sometime in the 4th century. There are a number of founding legends for the church. One is that emperor Constantine I founded the church in gratitude for the rescue of his daughter Costanza from a shipwreck. It may have been built or introduced into a pre-existing pagan temple dedicated to the cult of Hercules or Hadrian. One of the stones in the architrave is dated to 324. The church underwent numerous reconstructions, including in the 6th century. It was likely made into a Byzantine-style basilica during the era of Belisarius.

After an earthquake in 1635, the last reconstruction in 1656 led to the Baroque building by Dionisio Lazzari seen today. He designed the present cupola, completed in 1685. Further earthquakes in 1732 and 1805 required more reconstructions.

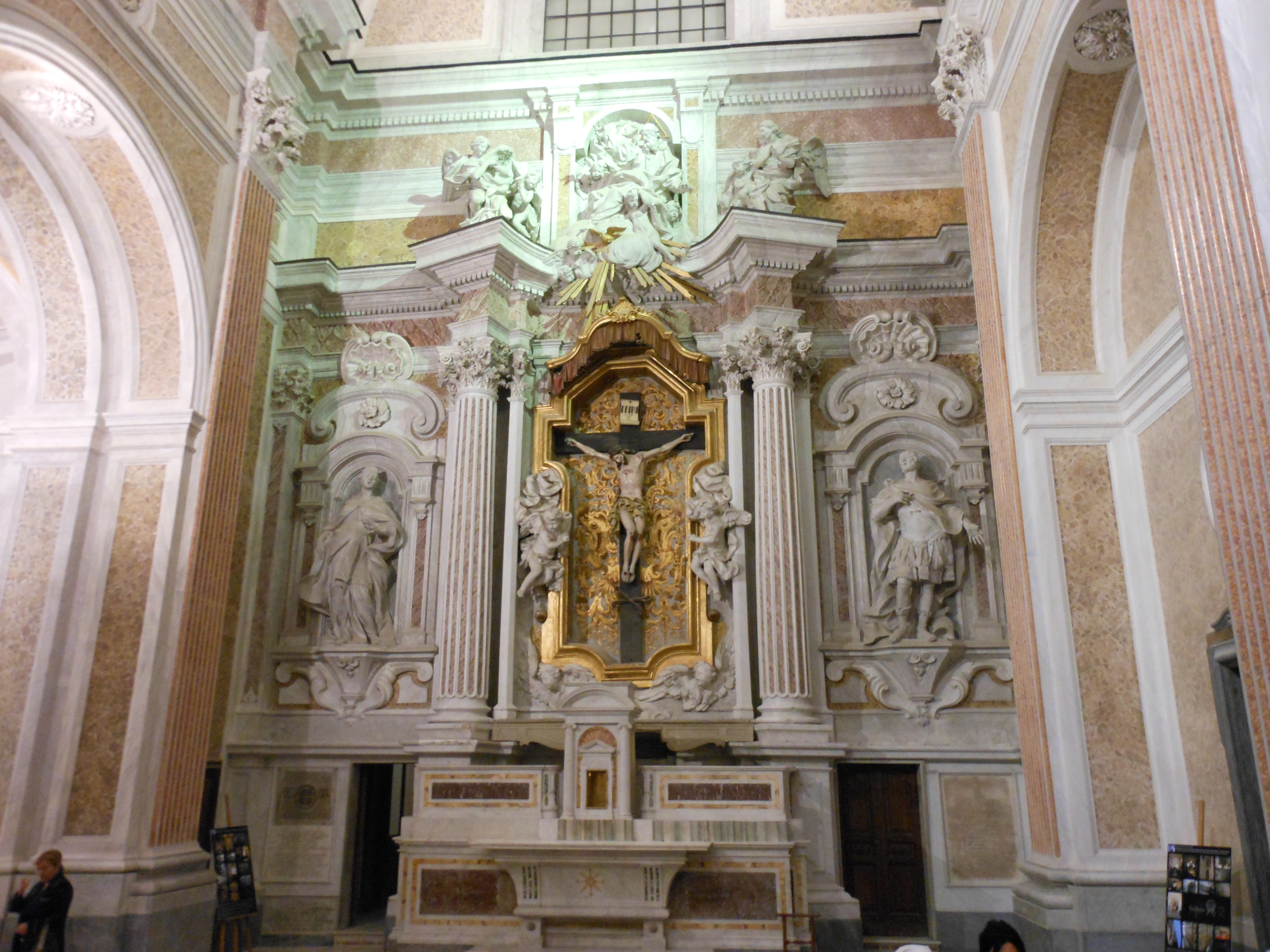
Cappellone del Crocifisso (Grand Chapel of the Crucifix) by Lorenzo Vaccaro

The 1870 earthquake devastated the church and knocked down the roof. For the restoration, Gennaro Aspreno Galante was unable reconstruct the former details. Almost razed in 1872, the local canon Giuseppe Perrella commissioned a neoclassical reconstruction, completed in 1887, from engineer George Tomlinson, with help by Errico Alvino and Federico Travaglini. A hundred years later, the roof again caved down, closing the church again for 42 years, until a restoration in 1978 unveiled the early-Christian apse, below the wooden choir dating from the 17th century. The church was long closed for restoration and architectural studies.

== The interior ==
The church has a basilica plan. On the counter facade is a large fresco of John the Baptist Preaching to Disciples (1730) by Giuseppe De Vivo; this church is dedicated to St. John the Baptist. The ceiling in wood is now simple, placed after the earthquake of 1970 dismembered the roof. An example of what the original ceiling, with its paintings depicting Baptism of Christ, looked like, can be seen in the first chapel on the right.

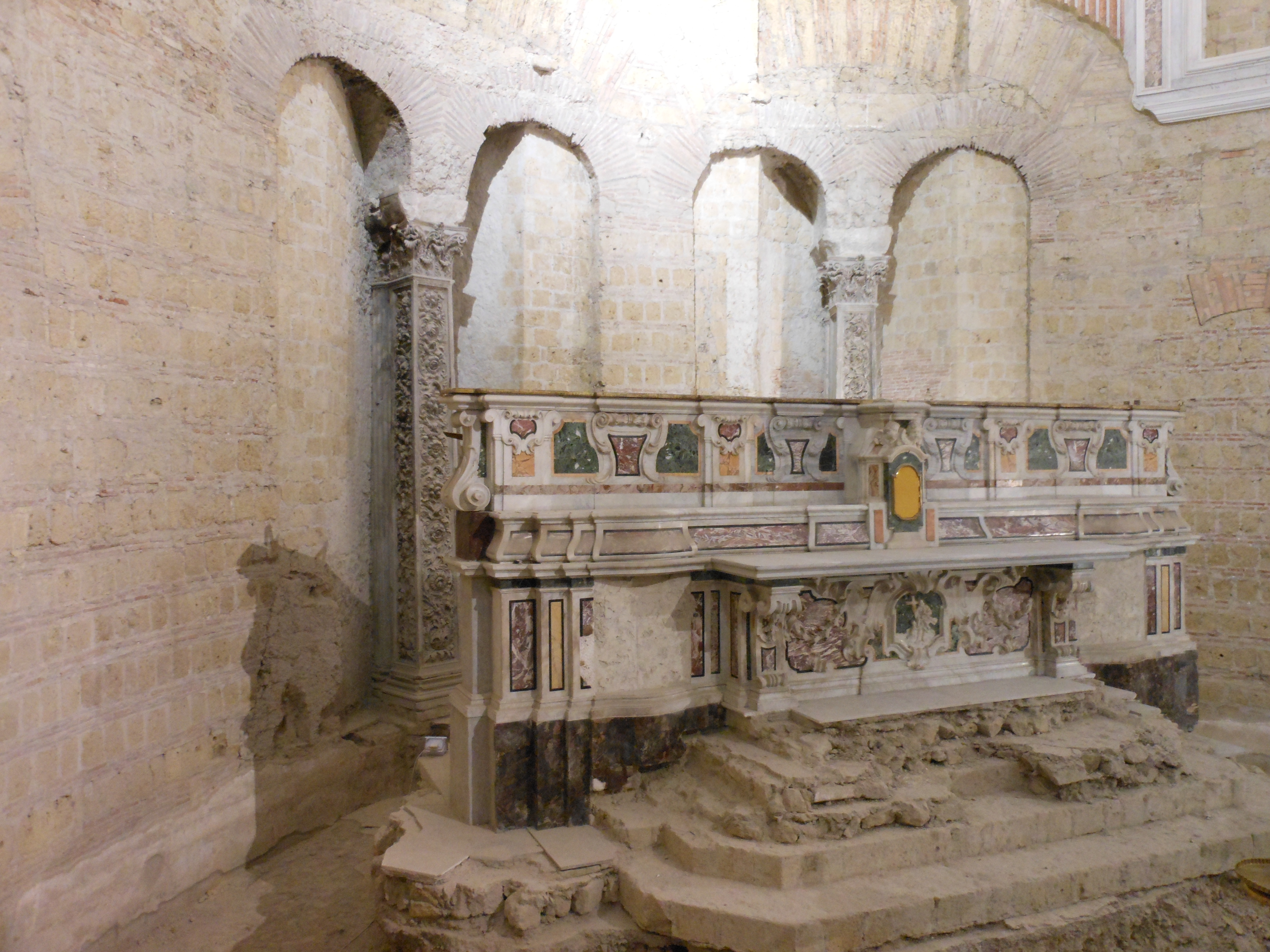
Main altar and paleo-Christian apse

The imposing main altar, damaged over the years, was built in 1743 by Domenico Antonio Vaccaro. Behind the apse is visible the ancient church apse.

The major chapel of the Crucifix or Cappellone del Crocifisso, in the left transept, has statues of Costantino and his daughter Costanza sculpted by Lorenzo Vaccaro in 1689. On the left, in the entry portal for the Oratory of the Confraternity of the 66 priests (Oratorio della Confraternita dei LXVI Sacerdoti) are two tombstones from 999 to 1003, that refer to the foundation and consecration of the basilica. The major chapel of Santa Lucia or Cappellone di Santa Lucia is found in the right transept. It was richly decorated during the Baroque era (completed in 1689) but completely destroyed during the 1870 earthquake. It was rebuilt in neoclassic style. The chapel of Santa Maria di Costantinopoli (previously known as dei Paleologi) at the left of the nave has a 16th-century fresco depicting Madonna and St Peter. It originally stood in the Chapel of Santa Lucia. The Ravaschieri Chapel, dedicated to John the Baptist, was designed and completed by the sculptor Giovanni da Nola. A marble decor from 1534 depicts the baptism of Jesus, flanked by a San Francesco di Paola (left) and a San Giacomo della Marca (right). It is surmounted by a crucifixion. The chapel of Sant'Adriano has an altarpiece attributed to either Giovanni da Nola or his disciples, Annibale Caccavello and Girolamo d'Auria, depicting the decapitation of the saint, and in the higher level, a Pietà with saints Phillip and James. The nave on the right has five chapels. The first is called the Chapel of the Madonna delle Grazie and has a terracotta presepio (nativity scene) from the 18th century. The ornate oratory is accessible to the left of the Chapel of the Crucifixion. It was founded in 1619.

== Bibliography ==
- Bartolomeo Capasso, Napoli greco-romana, Naples, 1905
- Carlo Celano, a cura di Giovanni Battista Chiarini, Notizie del bello, dell'antico e del curioso della città di Napoli, 1870
- Gennaro Aspeno Galante, Guida sacra della città di Napoli, 1872
