= Annibale Caccavello =

Italian sculptor (1515–1595)

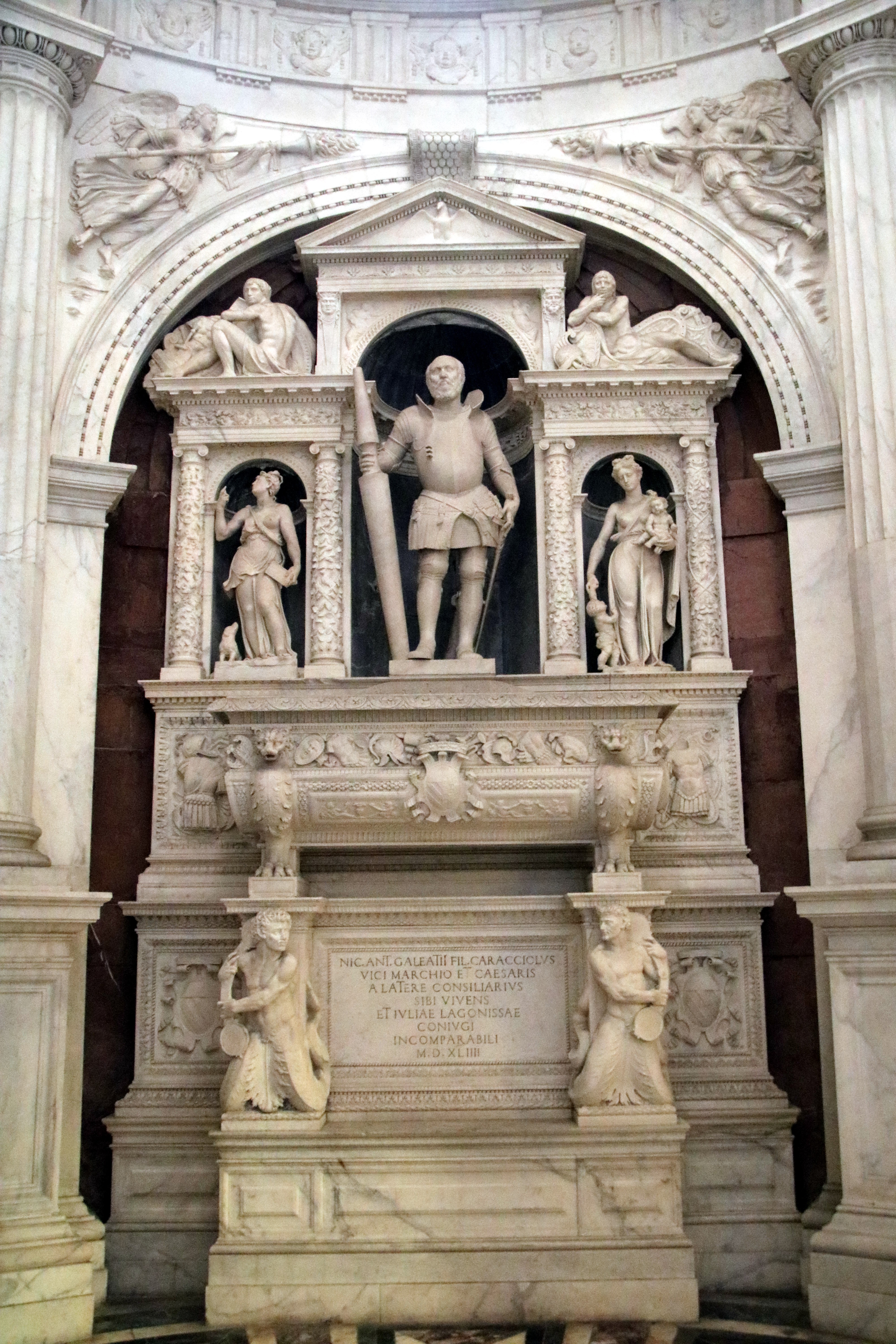
Tomb of Nicola Antonio Caracciolo, c. 1547; Naples, San Giovanni a Carbonara, Cappella Caracciolo di Vico

Annibale Caccavello (1515–1595) was an Italian sculptor of the Renaissance, active in his native city of Naples.

He trained under Giovanni Merliano (Giovanni da Nola). He was a fellow pupil with Domenico Auria. He participated in the sculptural decoration of the Caracciolo di Vico Chapel in the church of San Giovanni a Carbonara, to which Annibale contributed the statues of Saints Andrew, John the Baptist, and Augustine. He also contributed to the statuary of the Fontana dei 4 del Molo. He also worked on the tomb sculptures of Odet Foix de Lautrec and Pedro Navarro present at the church of Santa Maria La Nova, the tomb of Porzia Capece Rota in the Basilica of San Domenico Maggiore, and the funeral urn of Fabrizio Brancaccio in the church of Santa Maria delle Grazie Maggiore a Caponapoli, finished by Camillo Minieri Riccio.
