= Santa Maria Ancillarum =

Roman Catholic church in Naples, Italy

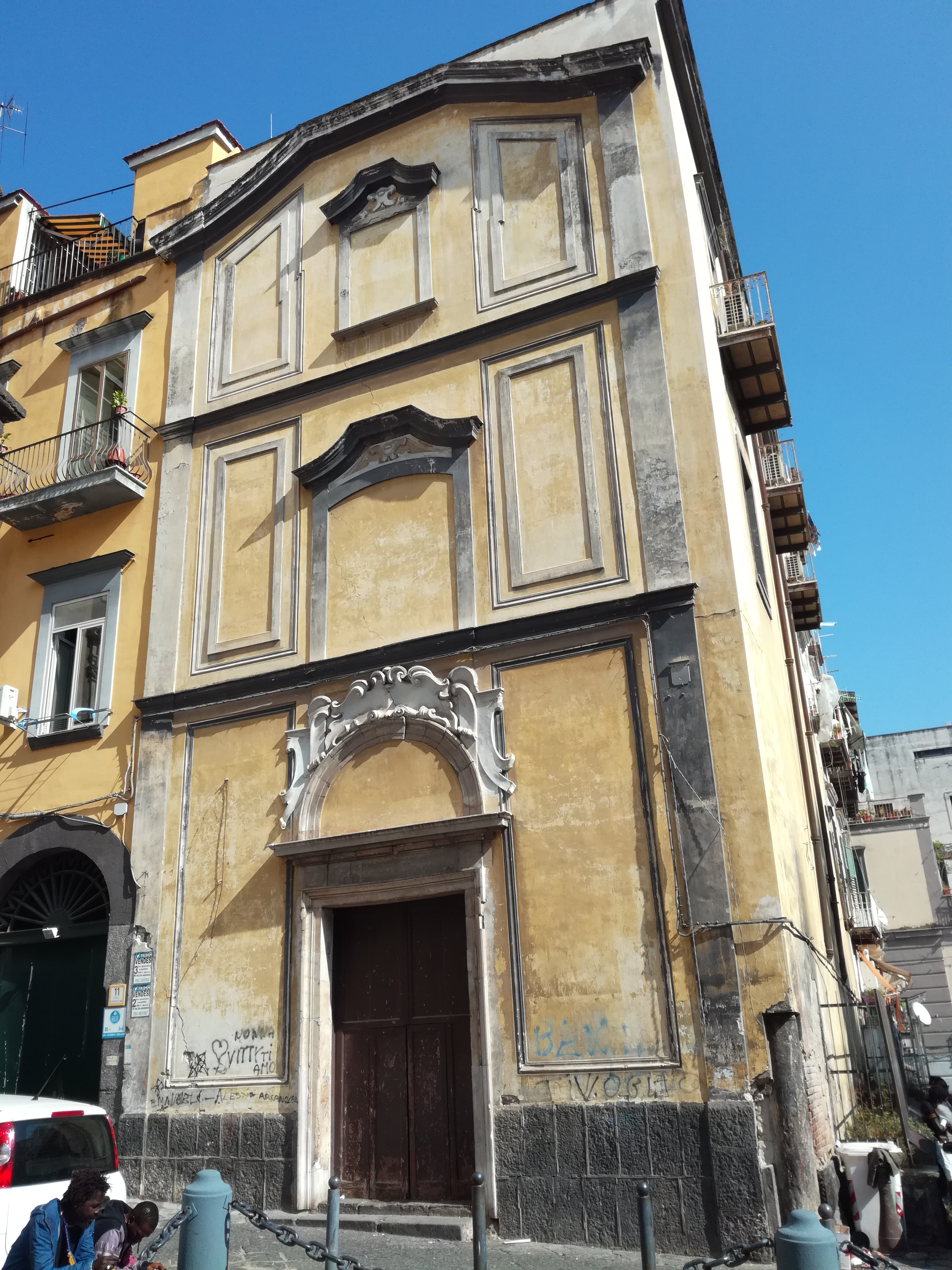
Facade

Santa Maria Ancillarum (literally St Mary of the Handmaidens) is a Roman Catholic church in Naples, Italy. Its most notable artwork is The Birth of the Virgin Mary by Giacinta Sacchetti (1734).

The origin of its name and the date of its foundation are both unknown. It may derive from the female servants of Mary of Hungary who retired to Santa Maria Donnaregina - they may have moved to live close to her and been granted this church by the Archbishop of Naples. The present Gothic structure dates to the 13th century. Its crossing has ceiling frescoes, as does its high altar. The high altarpiece was the late 15th century Madonna with Saints Jerome and Christopher, now in the Diocesan Museum.
