= Sant'Anna al Trivio =

Church in Naples, Italy

Sant'Anna al Trivio is a church in Naples. It is located on via Del Trivio in the zona Vicaria. 'al Trivio' refers to 'del Trecco', the nickname of Odet de Foix, viscount of Lautrec and commander of the enemy forces at the siege of Naples in 1528. It was built in 1864 and designed by Filippo Botta - it was his last design and he also buried his wife Fortunata Vecchione inside it in a reused 16th century sarcophagus. The church's two paintings by Luca Giordano are now in the Diocesan Museum.
