= Santi Cosma e Damiano ai Banchi Nuovi =

Church in Naples, Italy

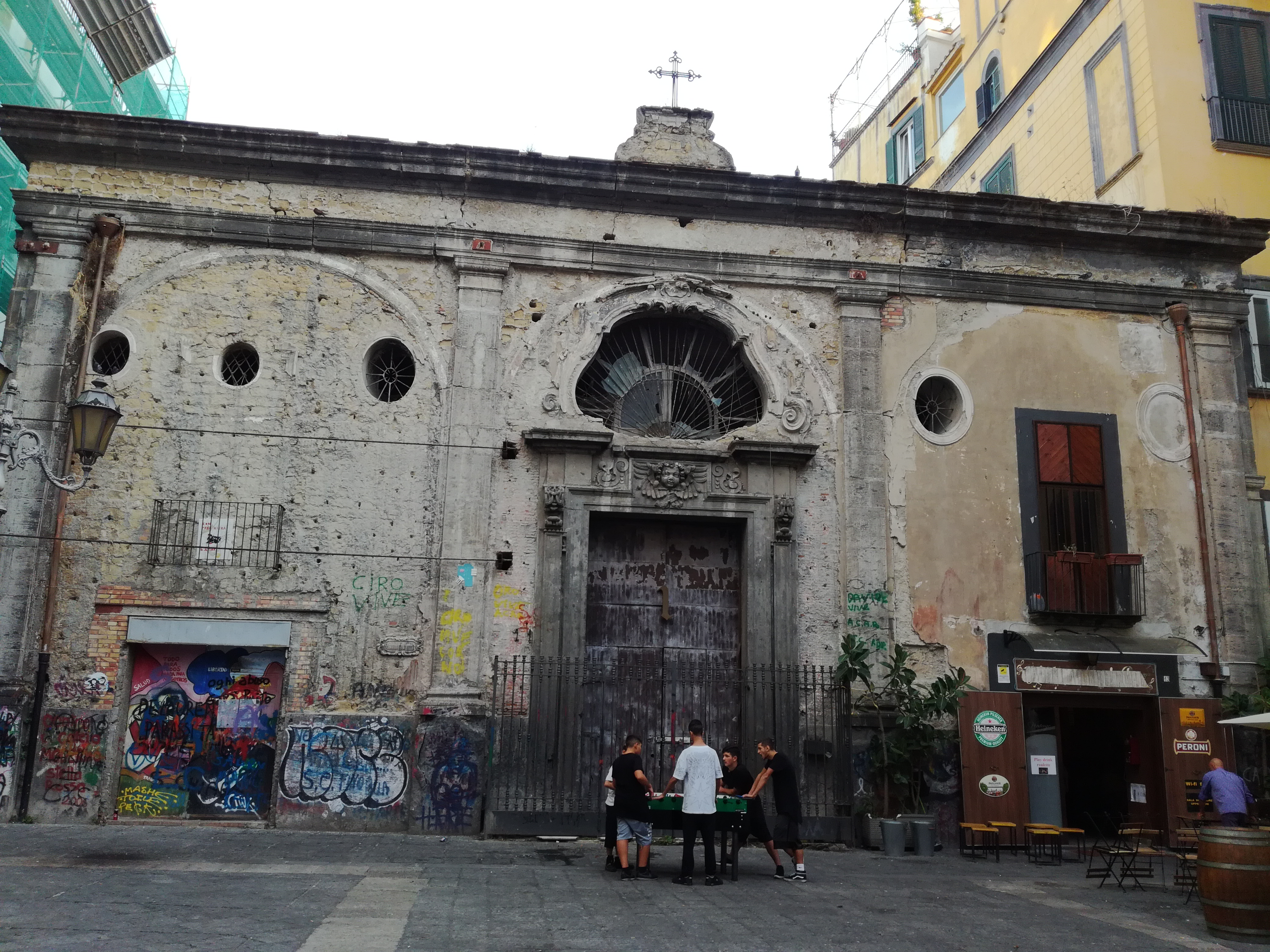
Facade

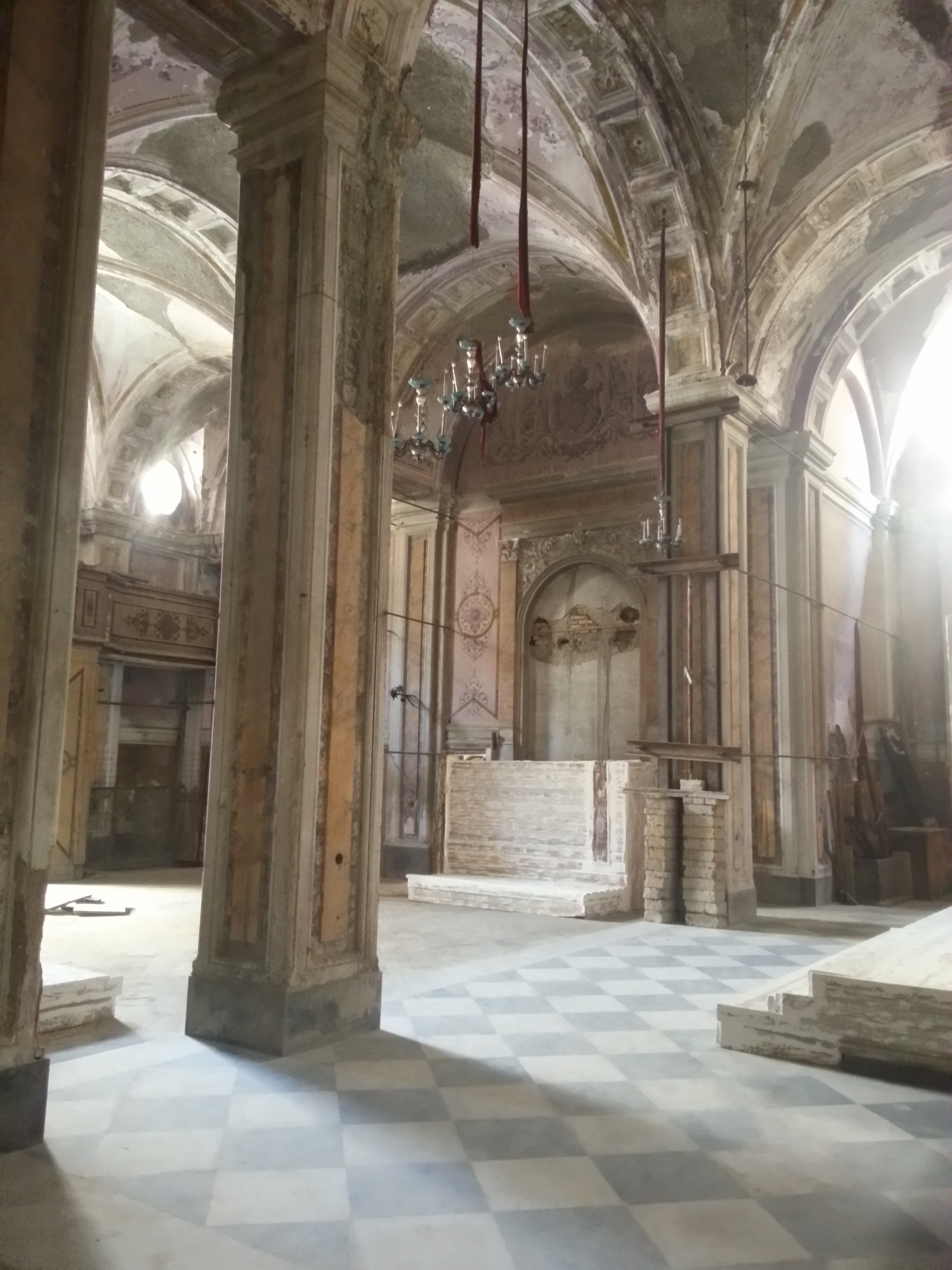
Interior

Santi Cosma e Damiano ai Banchi Nuovi is a deconsecrated church dedicated to Cosmas and Damian in Naples. It is located in the public square Banchi Nuovi and owes its name to the Banchi Nuovi, whose loggia previously occupied the church's site. The church was founded in 1616 and re-used the loggia's facade. It was extended later in the 17th century, including a scheme led by the engineer Luigi Giura. Its high altarpiece is now in the Diocesan Museum.
