= San Gennaro al Vomero =

Church building in Naples, Italy

Coordinates: 40.844933°N 14.231288°E

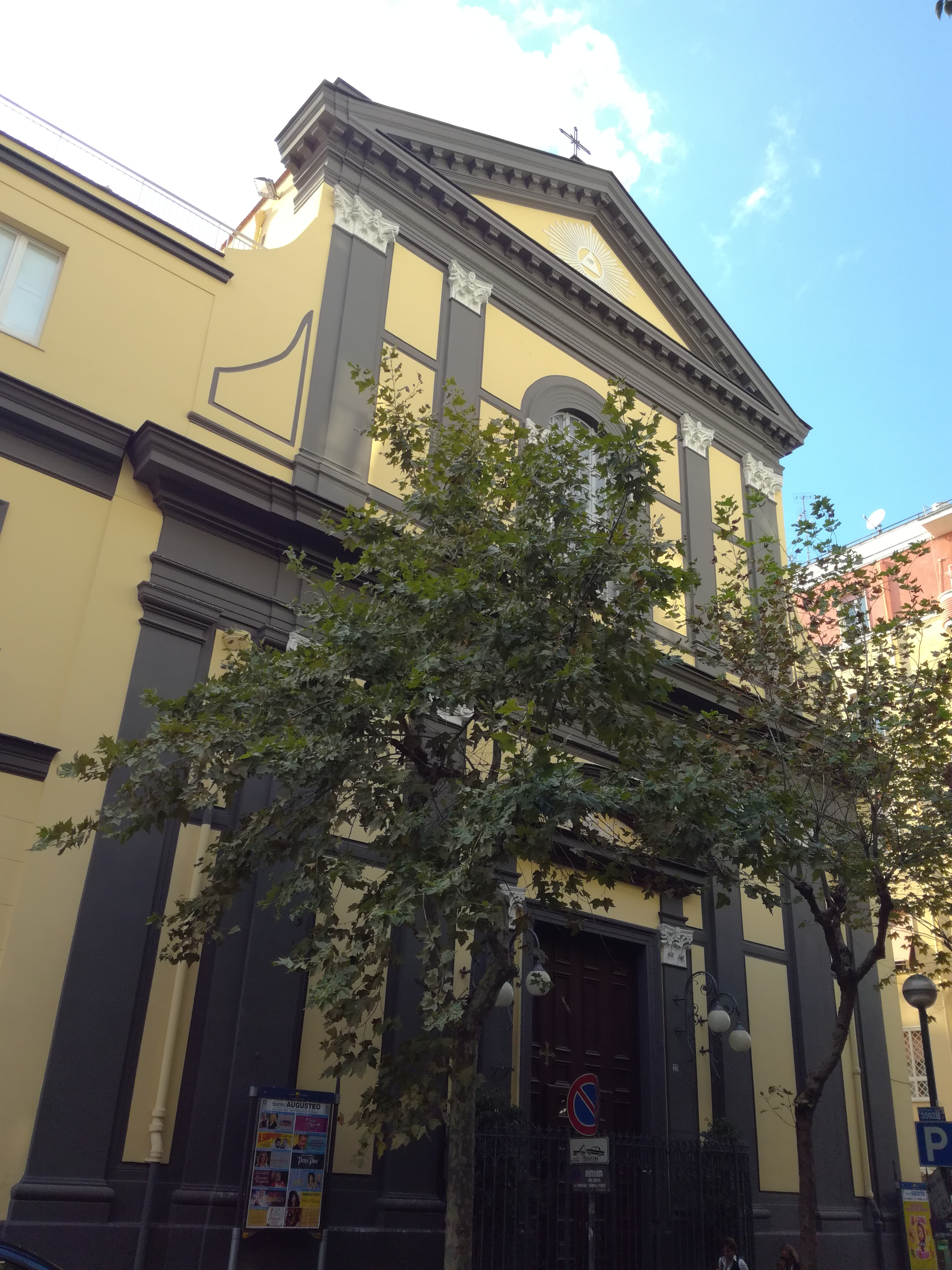
Exterior view of San Gennaro al Vomero

San Gennaro al Vomero is a Neoclassic-style church, located on the corner of via Solimena and via Giovanni Bernini, near the piazza Vanvitelli in Naples, Italy.

In part due to the 19th century urban renewal of Naples, the parish of San Gennaro al Vomero was established by Cardinal Guglielmo Sanfelice in this new reclaimed areas, and serve part of what had been the parish of Santa Maria del Soccorso all'Arenella. The architect was Luigi Bottino and the engineer Andrea Taglialatela. Construction began in 1892. The church was damaged during the 1930 earthquake and restored by 1931. Similar fate occurred after the 1980 earthquake, but restoration was slower.
