= Santa Maria della Verità =

Church of Santa Maria della Verità
- Chiesa di Santa Maria della Verità
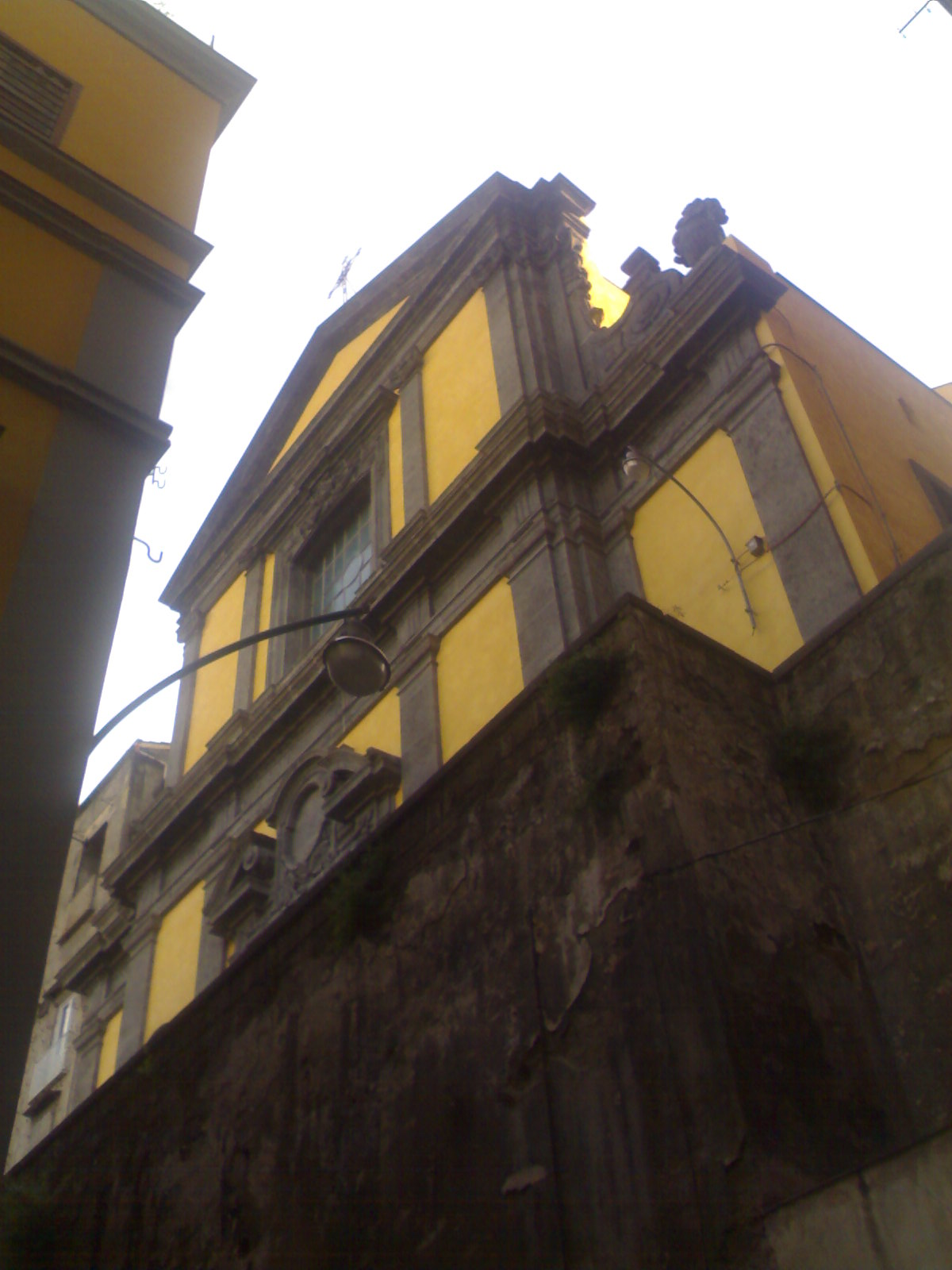
- The façade of Santa Maria della Verità.
- Church of Santa Maria della Verità
- 40.855550°N 14.247708°E
- Location: Naples; Province of Naples, Campania
- Country: Italy
- Denomination: Roman Catholic

History
- Status: Active
- Consecrated: 1653

Architecture
- Architectural type: Church
- Style: Baroque architecture
- Groundbreaking: 1603

Administration
- Diocese: Roman Catholic Archdiocese of Naples

Santa Maria della Verità (once called Sant'Agostino degli Scalzi or Santa Maria dell'Oliva) is a church in rione Materdei, in the quartiere of Stella of Naples, Italy. The entry is located on Via San Agostino degli Scalzi, number 6.

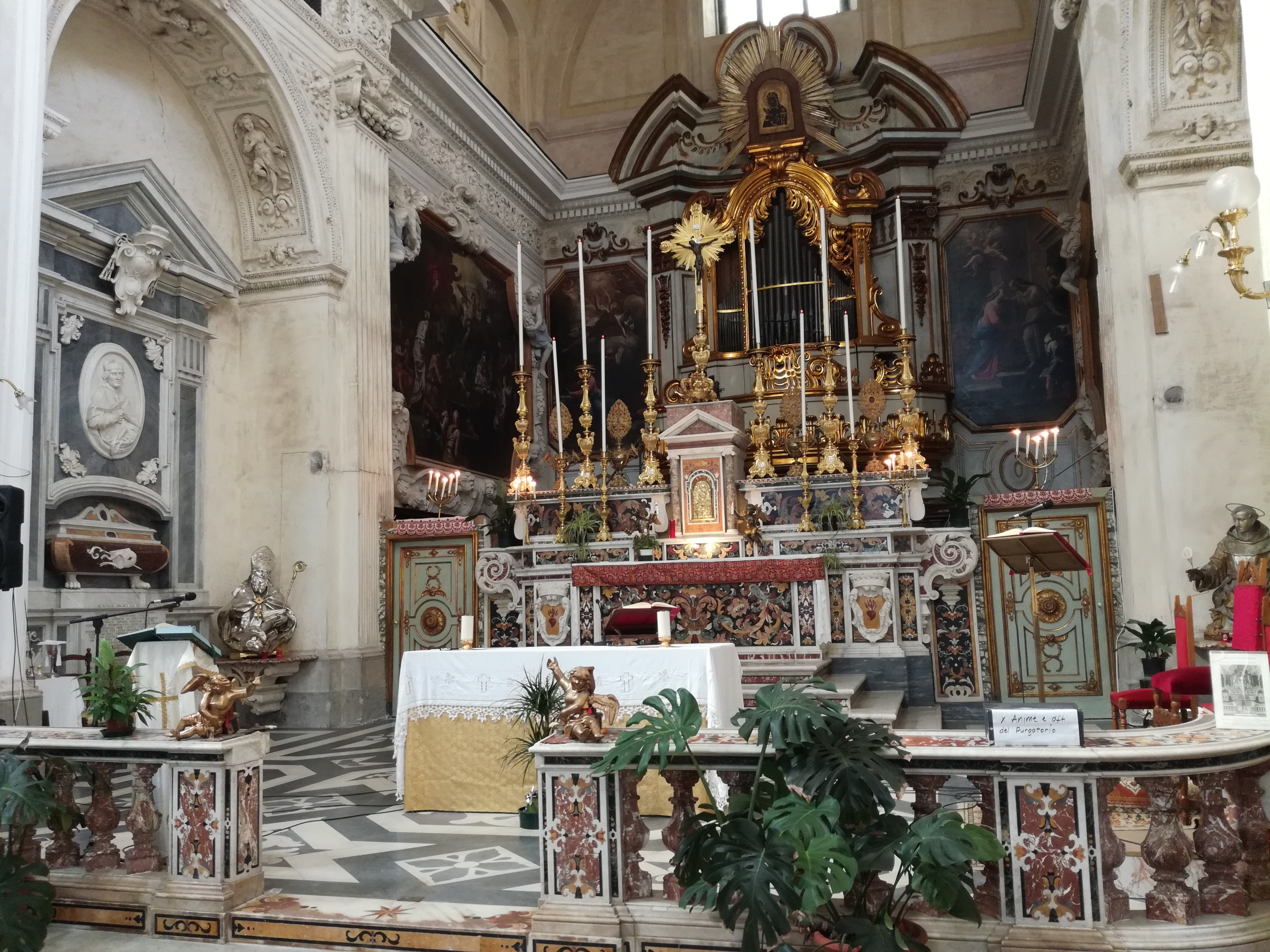
The main altar with a reproduction of the altarpiece

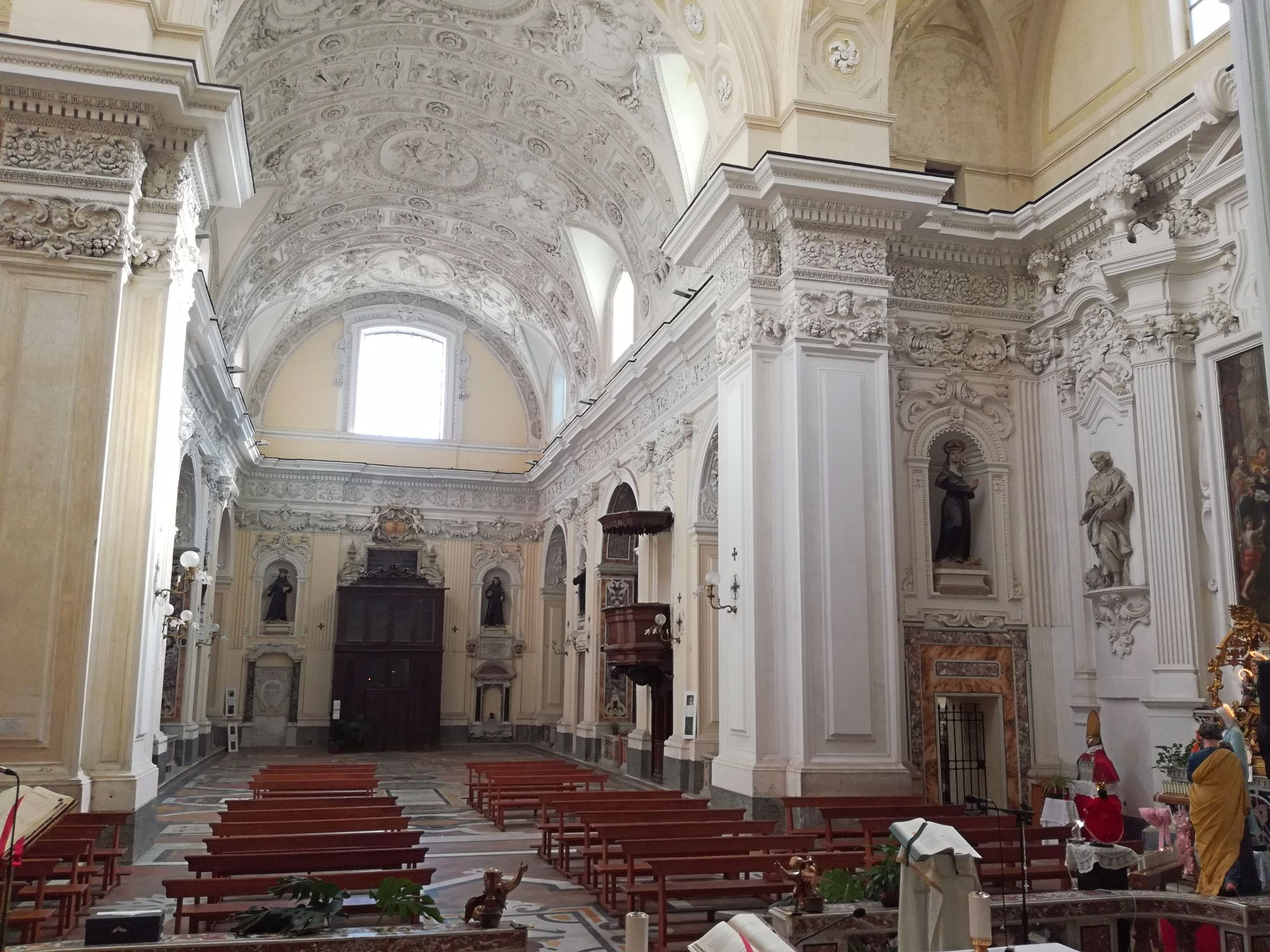
Interior

== History ==
The church was originally attached to the Discalced Augustinians, who arrived in 1593 to Naples, and had settled in the adjacent convent in 1597. The church was built during 1603–1627 by Giovan Giacomo di Conforto (who was also architect of the church of Santa Teresa degli Scalzi). The church was restored in 1688 by Arcangelo Guglielmelli and Giuseppe Astarita. The church was the setting of scenes in the 1954 movie L'oro di Napoli by Vittorio De Sica.

Like many churches in Venice it was damaged by the 1980 Irpinia earthquake, and has been abandoned for years, during which artworks and marbles have taken away, some stolen. Restoration started in the year 2000, but the church is still in use and open.

== Interior ==
The interior stucco decoration dates to the 17th century and the designs of Guglielmelli. Frescoes and canvases were painted by Massimo Stanzione, Giacomo del Po, Andrea d'Aste, Domenico Antonio Vaccaro, but some of the works have been transferred to the Museo di Capodimonte, such as canvases of Luca Giordano and Mattia Preti.

The sculptures in marble are by Bartolomeo Granucci and Nicola Mazzone, and stucco are by Giulio Mencaglia and Bartolomeo Ghetti, who also carved the main altar using a design by Guglielmelli. The pulpit was designed by Giovanni Conte, also called il Nano.

== Bibliography ==
- Achille della Ragione, Riaprand the church di Sant'Agostino degli Scalzi, Napoli 2008.
