= Biblioteca di Ricerca Area Umanistica (University of Naples Federico II) =

University library in Milan, Italy

Biblioteca di Ricerca Area Umanistica (BRAU)
- 40.85026°N 14.25197°E
- Location: Milan, Italy
- Established: 1564

Collection
- Size: 10 item, 239,488 volume

Access and use
- Access requirements: depends on library

Other information
- Website: BRAU. Biblioteca di Ricerca Area Umanistica

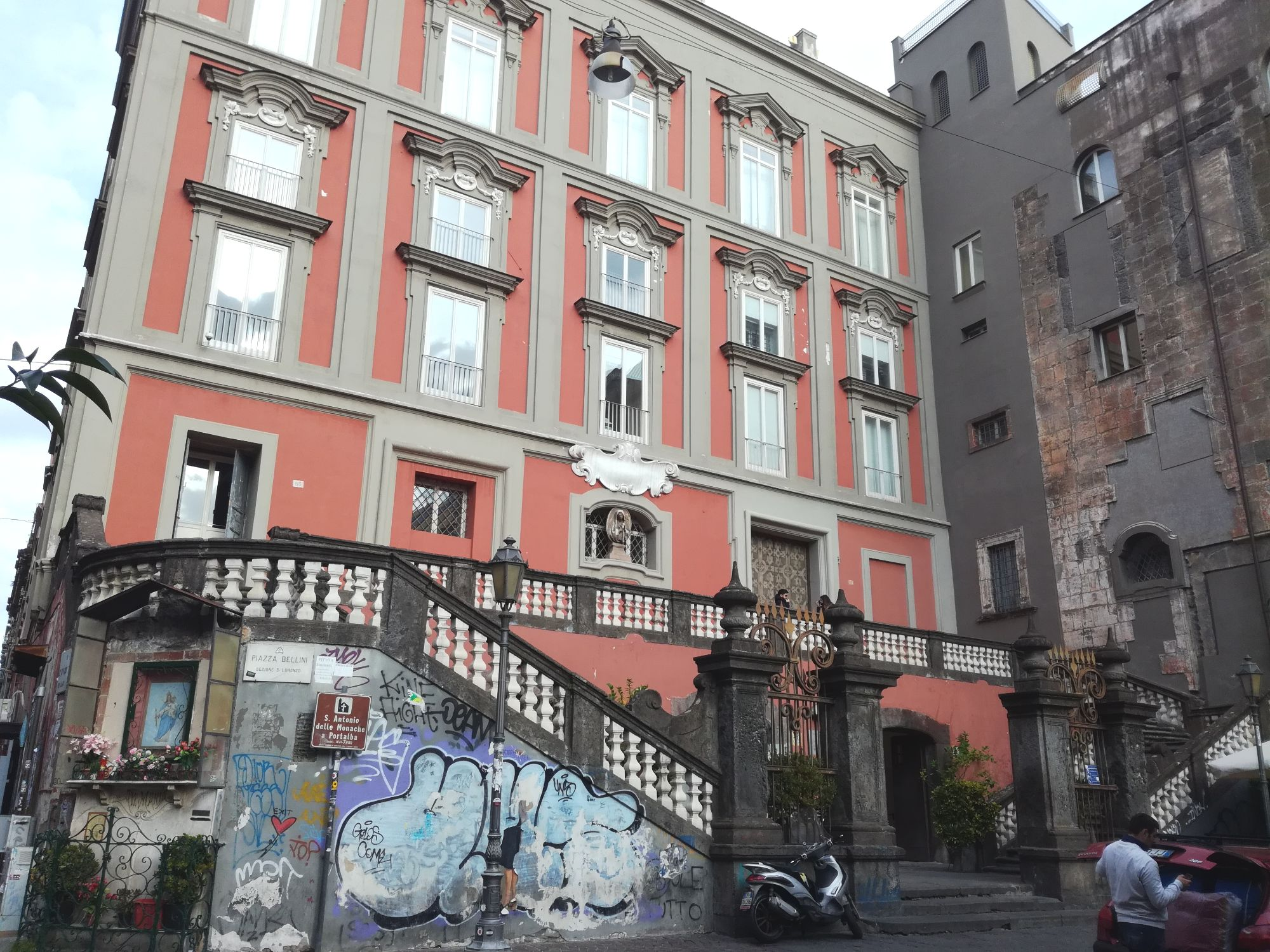
Exterior of the library

Biblioteca di Ricerca Area Umanistica (BRAU) is the university library of the Dipartimento di Studi Umanistici of the University of Naples Federico II.

It was established in 2009 but Neapolitan Baroque building dates back to 1564, designed by Paola Cappellani. It is located in Piazza Bellini in the historic city-centre of Naples, Italy.

== History ==
The building, whose name is Sant'Antoniello a Port'Alba was founded as a convent in 1564 by sister Paola Cappellani. The monastery was expanded by annexing the neighbouring palazzo of the Principi di Conca – this closed off the original facade from public access, although the remains of the original doorway are still visible.

The present 18th-century facade was built at the same time as the building's large two-ramp staircase. After a recent restoration, the building was purchased by the University of Naples Federico II. Since January 26, 2009, it became the location for BRAU, the humanities research library of the university.

== Interior architecture and decoration ==
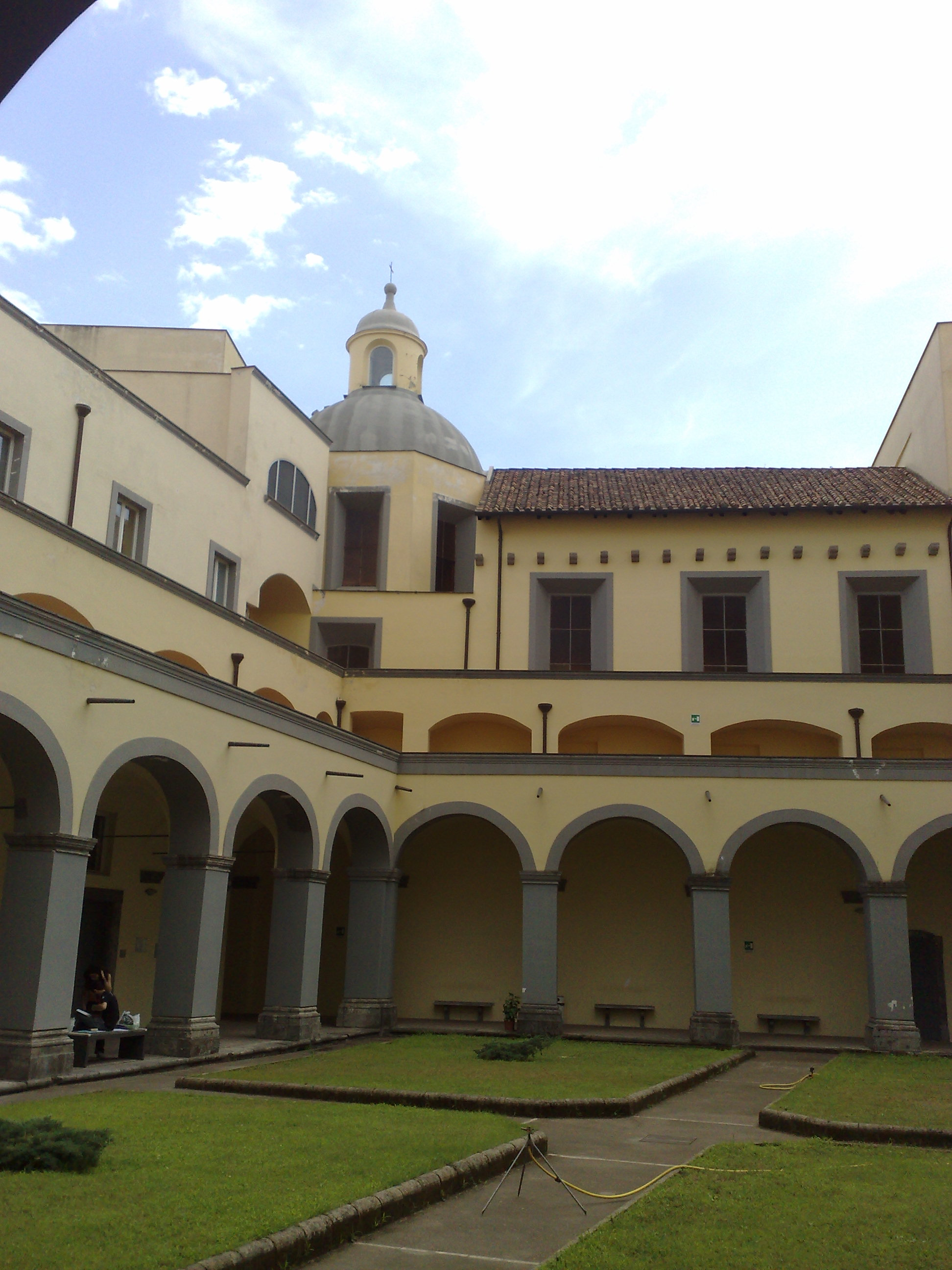
Library gardens

The architecture and interior decoration of the library follow the Neapolitan Baroque style, especially thanks to the stucco works completed by Arcangelo Guglielmelli to restore the church in 1684. The altar is marble, with inset pearl. For a while, the main altar's painting was Bernardo Cavallino's Santa Cecilia in estasi but, after several controversies, the work was moved to the Museo di Capodimonte.

On the side altars, there are more canvas paintings like San Giuseppe by Antonio Sarnelli and Ferdinando Castiglia's San Filippo Benizi. The ceiling depicts a painting of Saint Anthony, completed in the 1700s by an unknown Mannerist. There is also a wooden statue of Saint Michael Archangel from the 18th century.

== Bibliography ==
- Regina, Vincenzo (2004). Le chiese di Napoli. Viaggio indimenticabile attraverso la storia artistica, architettonica, letteraria, civile e spirituale della Napoli sacra (in Italian). Naples: Newton e Compton.
