= San Pietro in Vinculis, Naples =

Deconsecrated church in Naples, Italy

Coordinates: 40°50′41.14″N 14°15′19.62″E

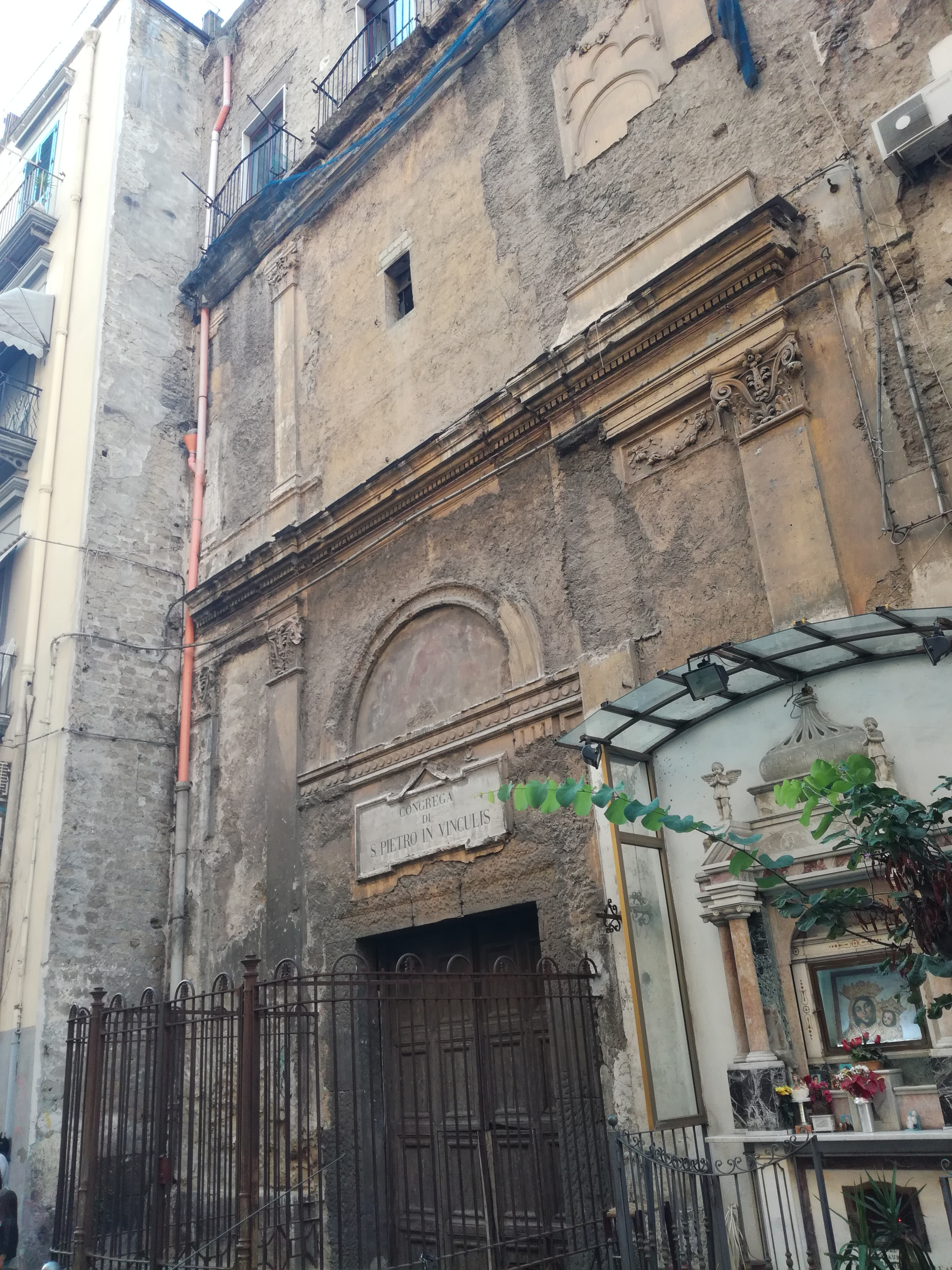
Facade

San Pietro in Vinculis is a deconsecrated Roman Catholic church in Naples. It is situated in the historic city centre on via Sedile di Porto, near via Mezzocannone.

It was built in the 15th century to plans by Angelo Aniello Fiore, though its present appearance reflects its extension in the 16th century by professor Giovanni Lucio Scoppa to house a new school for poor children. It was restored in 1654, according to a plaque behind the high altar.

Part of the structure is now private accommodations. As of 2024, there is some deterioration of the vaults, which might cost more than €1 million to repair.
