= Gesù e Maria Complex =

Monastic complex in Naples, Italy

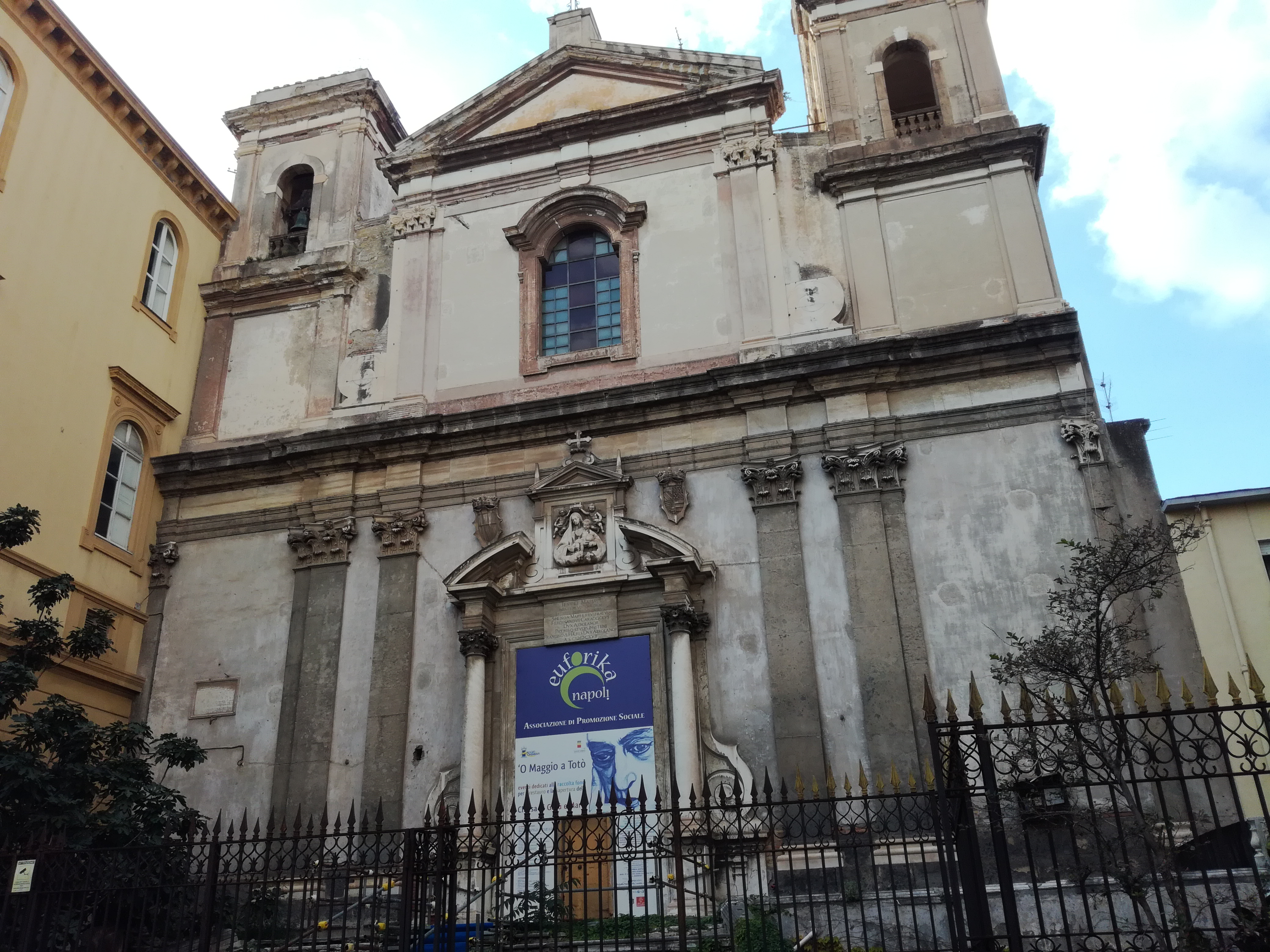
Facade of the church

Gesù e Maria Complex was a small monastic complex in Naples which also included the monastic church. The monastery buildings now house a hospital. It is sited on the summit of the zona di Pontecorvo. It was first built for the Dominican friar Silvio d'Atripalda in 1580 - he had obtained its site from Ascanio Coppola. In 1585 the complex was remodelled and extended in the Baroque style by Domenico Fontana - it is one of his earliest works. The Dominicans were expelled in 1812 and their lands and buildings confiscated by the French occupiers. It had passed to another order by 1863, when the monastic buildings were again secularised and turned into a hospital but the church retained as a parish church. It was already in a state of decay by the end of the 19th century and so in 1979 the church was closed, after which it was hit by thefts, the 1980 earthquake and looting. The hospital had been demolished in the meantime. The church was briefly opened for a month in 2012 but it has not yet been fully restored and its future is uncertain.

== Bibliography (in Italian) ==
- Vincenzo Regina, Le chiese di Napoli. Viaggio indimenticabile attraverso la storia artistica, architettonica, letteraria, civile e spirituale della Napoli sacra, Roma, Newton Compton, 2004. ISBN 88-541-0117-6.
- Maria Rosaria Costa, I chiostri di Napoli, Tascabili Economici Newton, Roma, 1996. ISBN 88-818-3553-3
