= Lello da Orvieto =

Italian painter

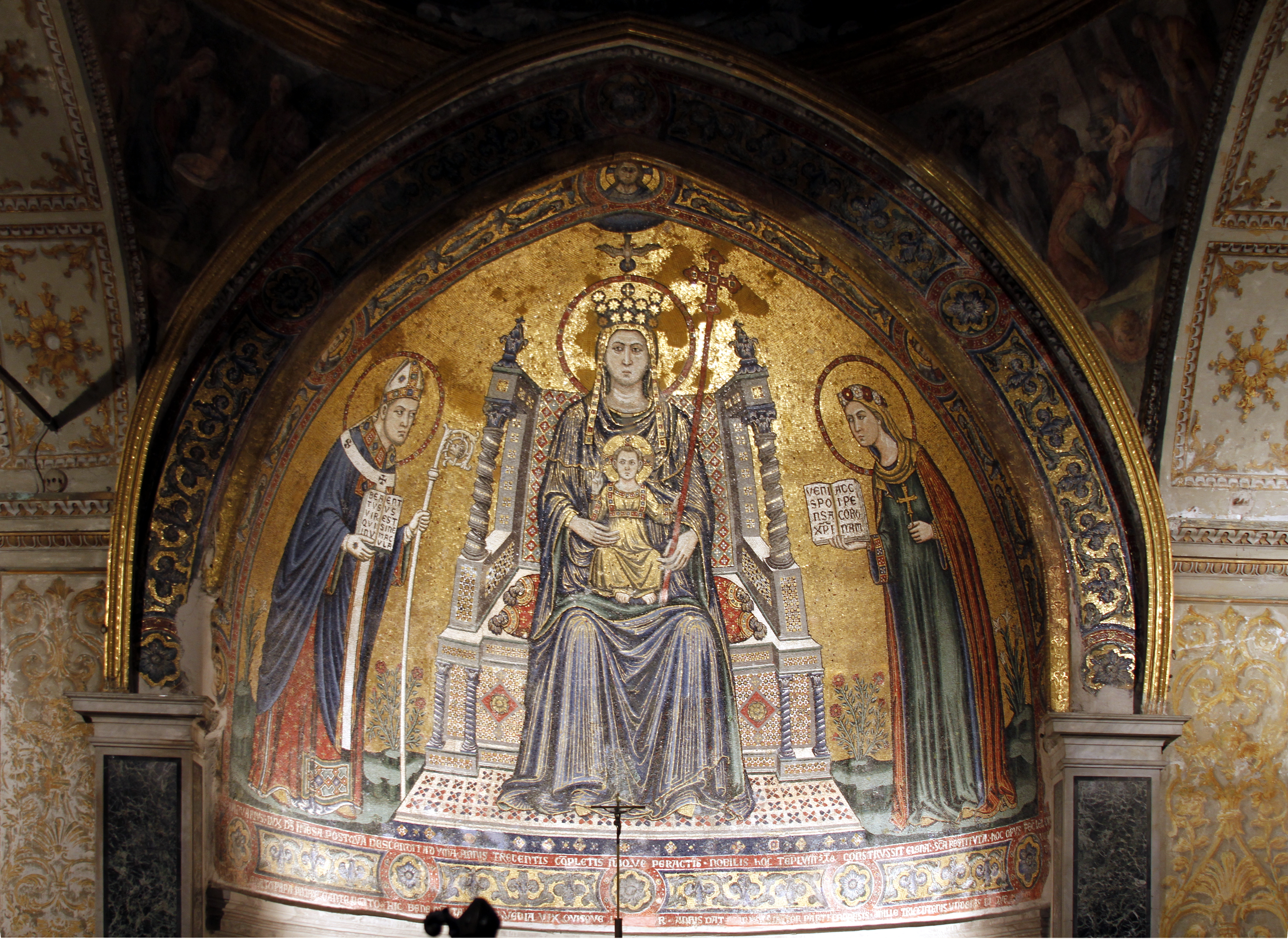
Enthroned Madonna with Saints Januarius and Restituta, Naples Cathedral. Pope Clement XIV granted the mosaic a Canonical coronation and was crowned on January 8, 1773.

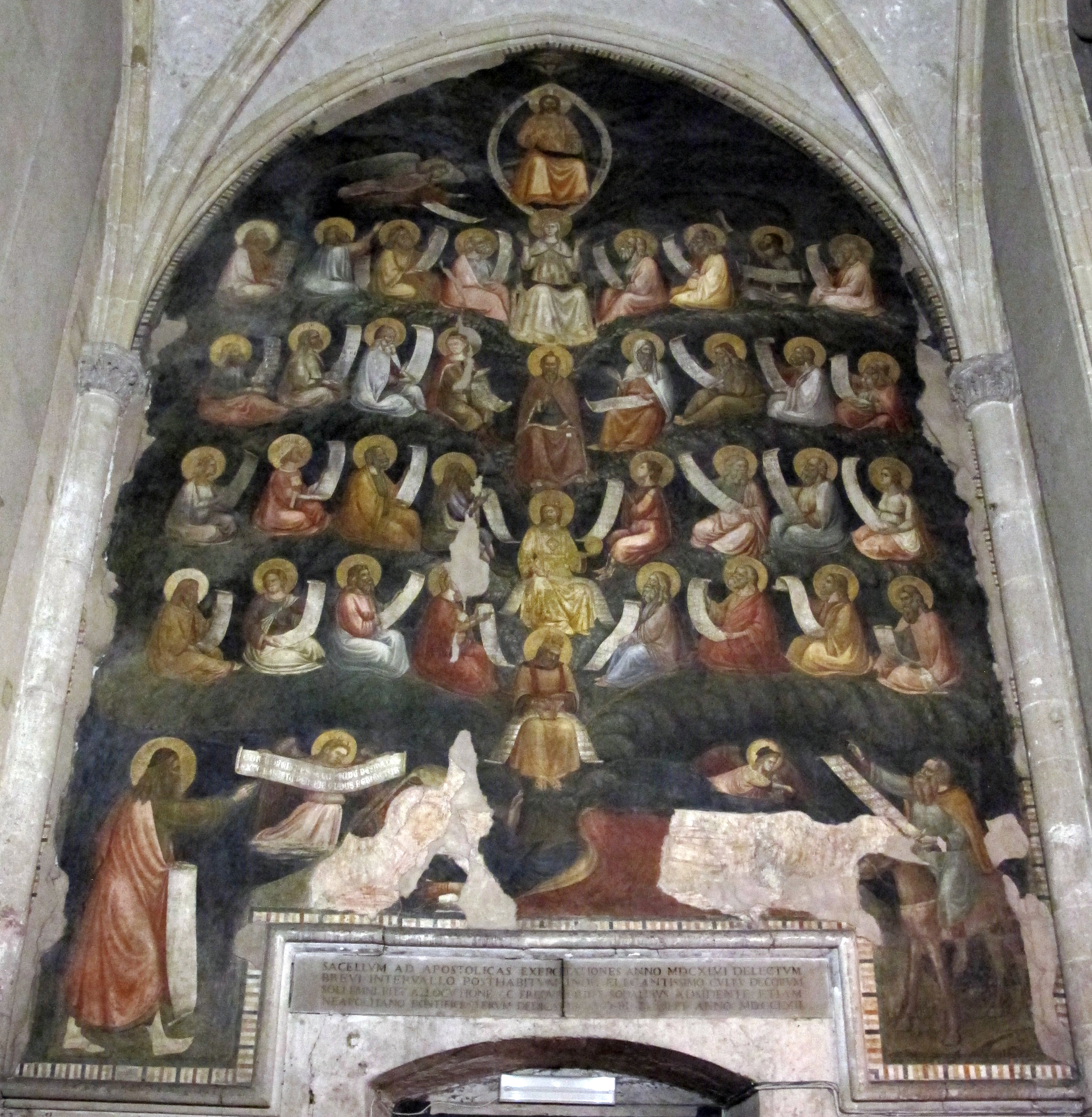
Tree of Life by Lello in the 'Cappella degli illustrissimi' in Naples Cathedral.

Lello da Orvieto was an Italian painter and mosaicist, active in Naples and Lazio between 1315 and 1340.

He was born in Orvieto and produced the 1322 or 1313 mosaic Enthroned Madonna with Saints Januarius and Restituta in Naples Cathedral - he signed it Lellus de Urb(evetere). Two frescoes are also attributed to him - the c.1315 Tree of Life in the cappella degli Illustrissimi in Naples Cathedral and the c.1320-1340 Redeemer and Saints in the Chapter House of the Poor Clares at Santa Chiara.

== Bibliography (in Italian) ==
- Ernst Gombrich, Dizionario della Pittura e dei Pittori, Einaudi Editore, 1997.
- Vinni Lucherini, 1313-1320 : il cosiddetto Lello da Orvieto, mosaicista e pittore, a Napoli, tra committenza episcopale e committenza canonicale, in El Trecento en obres, Art de Catalunya i art d'Europa al segle XIV, dir. R. Alcoy, Barcelone, Universitat de Barcelona, 2009, p. 185-216.
- Pierluigi Leone De Castris, Pietro Cavallini: Napoli prima di Giotto, Napoli 2013.
