= Nicolò Fumo =

Italian sculptor

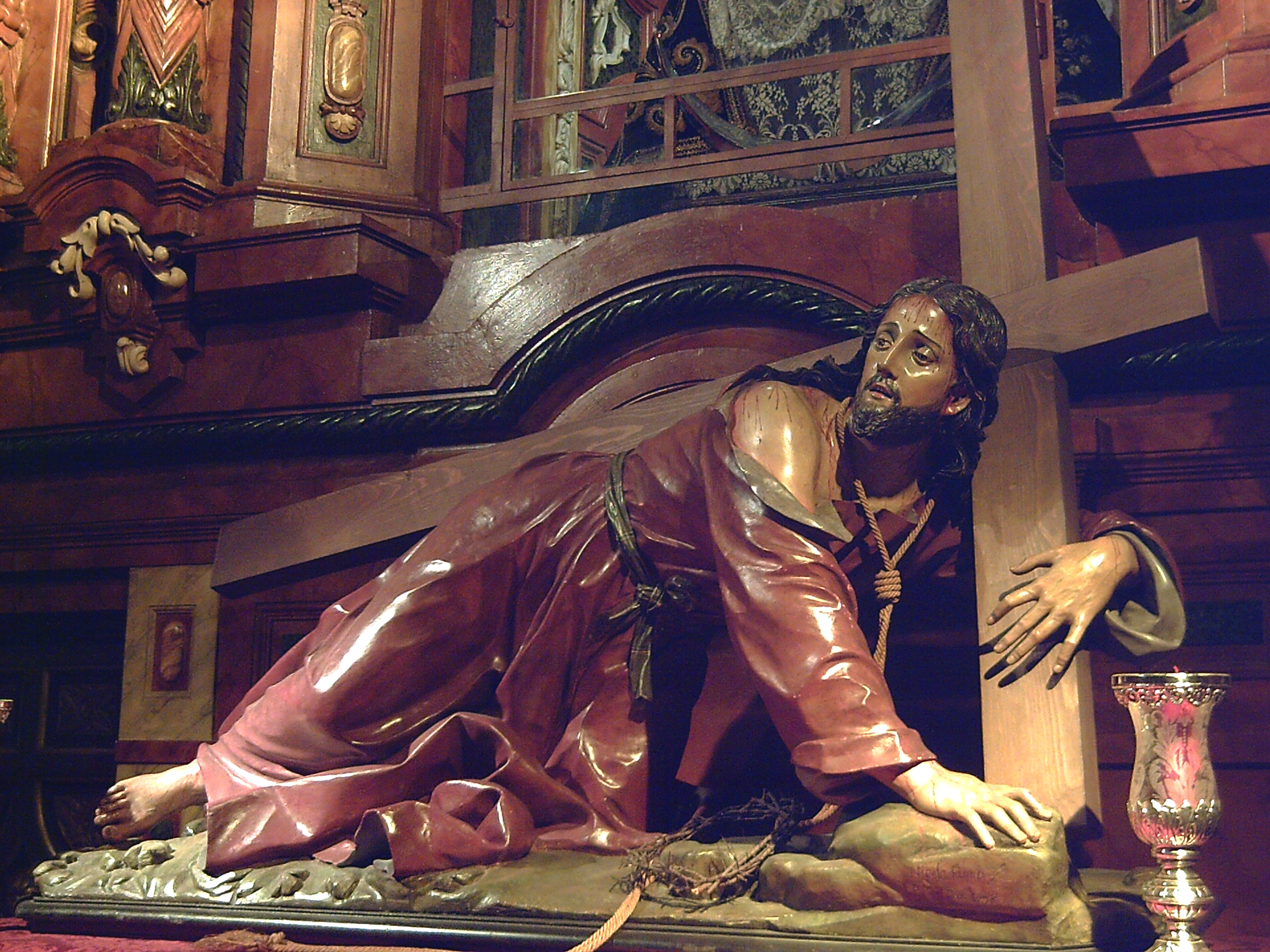
Fallen Christ sculpture by Nicolo Fumo, 1698.

Nicolo Fumo (1647–1725) was an Italian sculptor and architect known for his wooden works. He is also known as Niccolo Fumo or Nicola Fumo.

Fumo was born at Saragnano. A pupil of Cosimo Fanzago, he sculpted the statue of Saint Lucia in the church of the same name in Naples, a St. George in 1720, the Archangel Gabriel (private collection), a statue in the church of the Holy Savior of Baronissi and many other statues of saints in the chapel of the Church of the Convent of Holy Trinity in Baronissi.

He worked in both the Kingdom of Naples, then a Spanish possession, and in the Kingdom of Spain, where he received the title of court sculptor in 1689.

== See also ==
- Santa Maria di Montesanto, Naples, for one of his works
