= Santa Sofia, Naples =

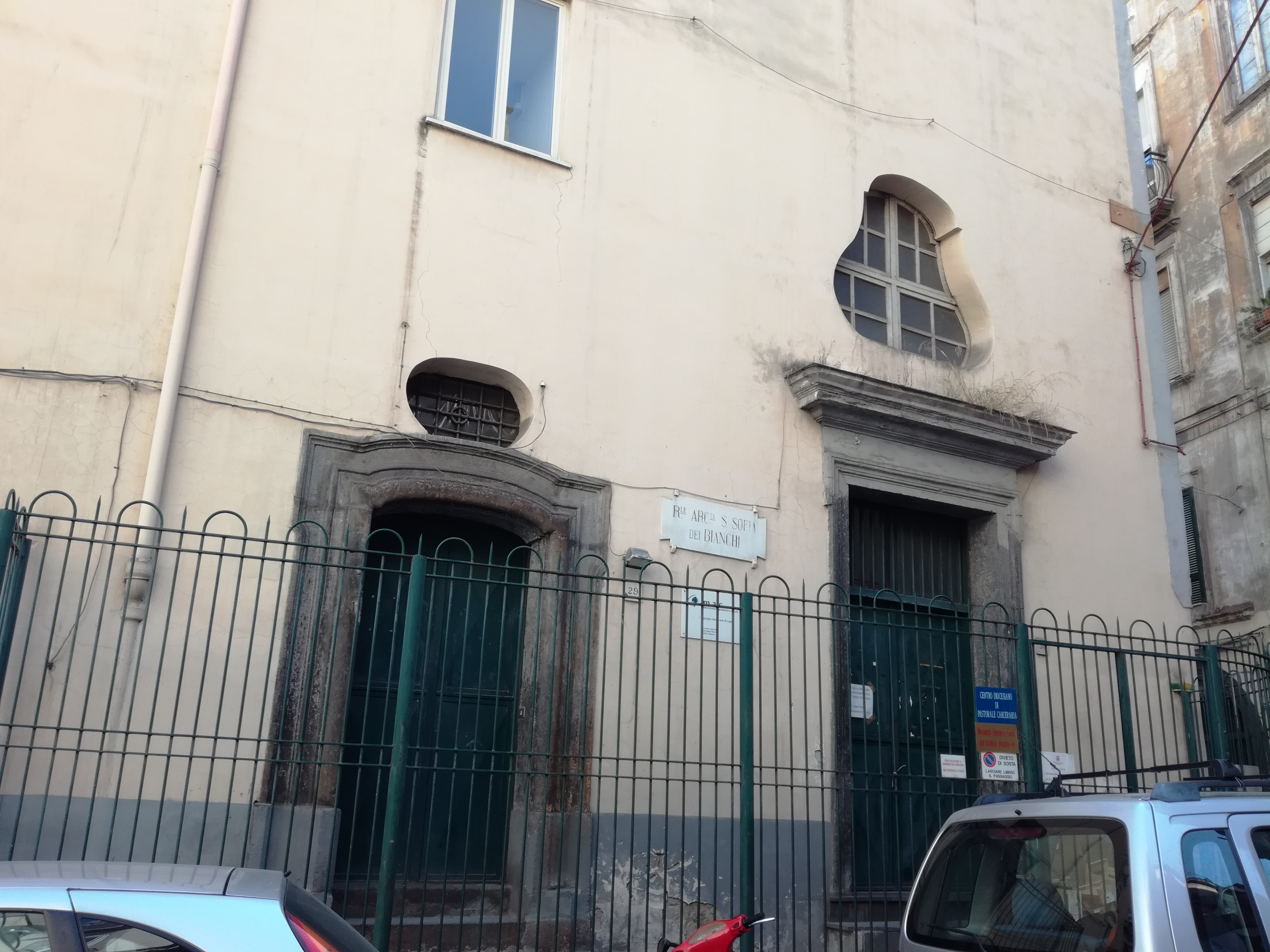
Facade

Santa Sofia was a church on via Santa Sofia in the city of Naples, Italy, now deconsecrated.

It was founded around 308 by Constantine, though the present church was built in 1487 to house a congregation which worked to bury the poor. It has a 1754 maiolica pavement and its facade has two doors. It also contained paintings by Fabrizio Santafede and Marco Pino, but these were removed after the 1980 earthquake.
