= Girolamo D'Auria =

Italian sculptor (1577–1620)

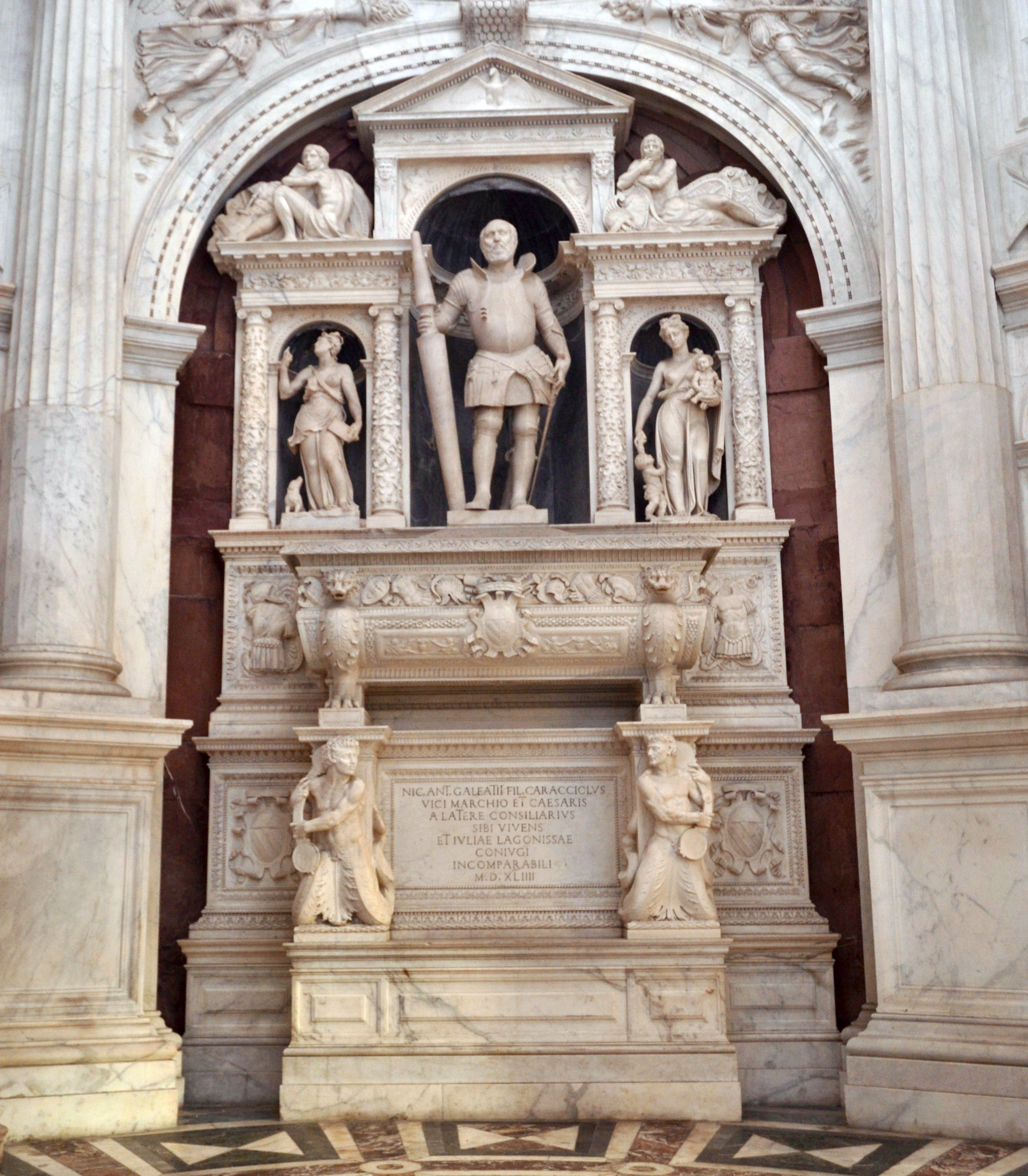

Girolamo D'Auria (1577–1620) was an Italian sculptor, active mainly in Naples, Italy. His first name is variously used as Hieronymus, Ieronimo, Hieronimo, Jeronimo, Geronimo or Gerolamo. Girolamo's father, Giovanni Domenico D'Auria, and Annibale Caccavello, were pupils of Giovanni da Nola. his main task was sculpting funereal monuments including some in Santi Severino e Sossio, the church of Santa Maria di Monteoliveto, and the monument of Giovanni Alfonso Bisvallo, sculpted in 1617 at San Severo al Pendino.
