= Basilica of Santa Maria a Pugliano =

Church in Ercolano, Italy

Coordinates: 40.8124°N 14.3527°E

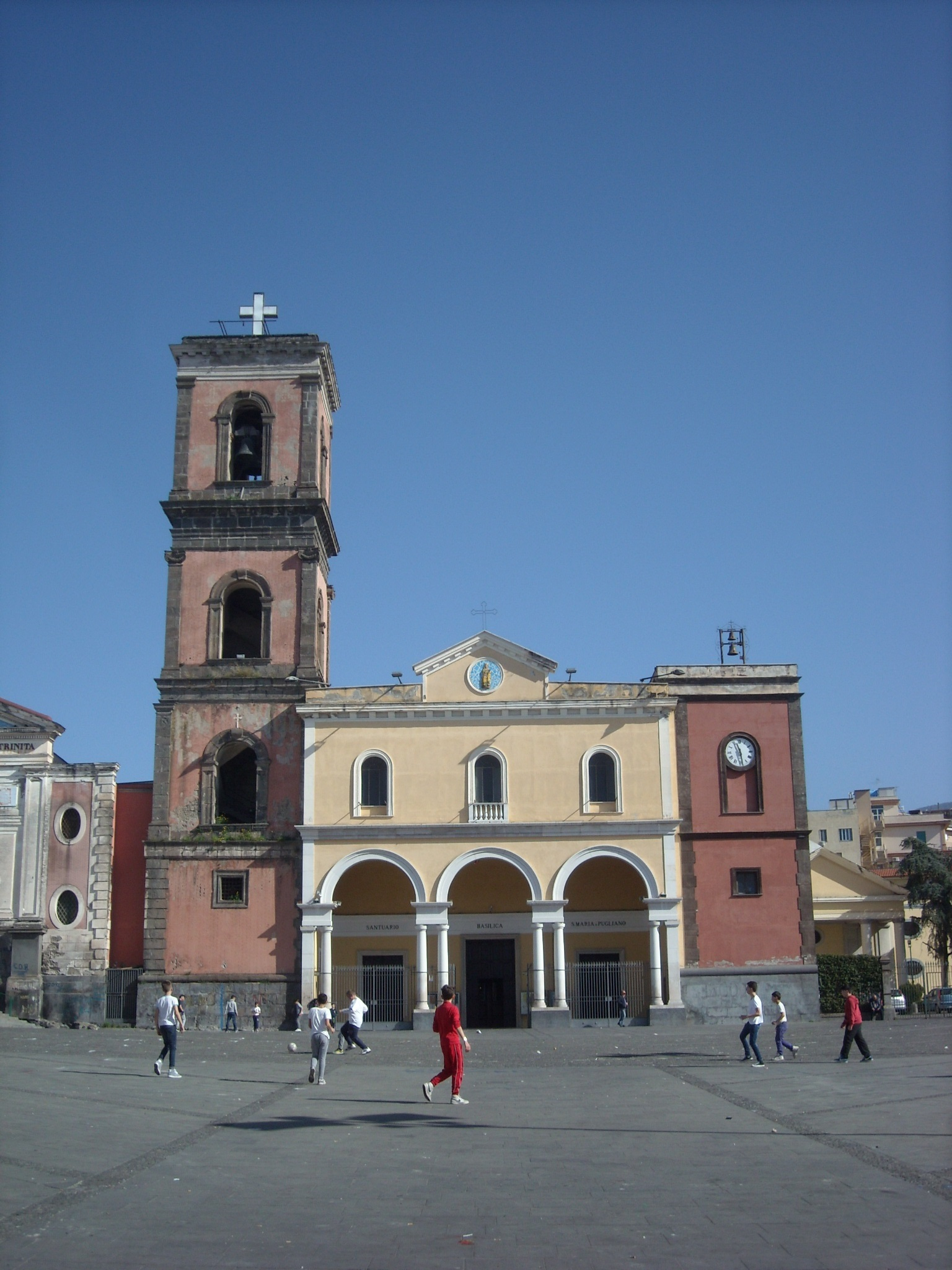
Exterior

The Basilica of Santa Maria a Pugliano is the main church in Ercolano and the oldest church in the area around Mount Vesuvius.

The church contains two pagan marble sarcophagi from the 2nd and 4th centuries AD, later adapted into Christian altars, probably in the 11th century. There are records of an oratory dedicated to the Virgin Mary in the 11th century on a hill called Pugliano, whose name probably derives from the 'praedium pollianum', a farm on the outskirts of Ercolano belonging to someone called Pollio or Pollione. One noblewoman in Naples in 1076 left legacies to various churches in the city as well as to 'S.Maria at Pugnanum tari 8'. Her will is the oldest document that confirms the existence and the high reputation of the church in the 11th century. During the following centuries the church's popularity increased and pilgrims flood here from everywhere. In the early years after the Council of Trent the church obtained formal acknowledgement of its eminence: in 1574 was first mentioned as "basilica"; two years later became the parish church of Resina and Portici and by papal bull on 13 June 1579 Pope Gregory XIII confirmed the plenary indulgences of his predecessors to the pilgrims visiting the church on the first Friday of March, Easter Day and 15 August, Assumption day. In that century main works were made to enlarge and embellish the church. During the eruption of 1631 the church was miraculously spared by the lava. Some years later a new street (via Pugliano) was built on the solidified lava to easily reach the church from the town centre. On 18 October 1849 Pope Pius IX, hosted in the royal palace of Portici by the king of Naples during his exile from Rome, visited the basilica.

The church's long history is proven by its art and architecture: the massive 36-meter high belfry from the end of the 16th century is one of the oldest of the area. Inside the church, there are sarcophagi from the 2nd and 4th centuries AD, that prove the existence of inhabitants in the area of Herculaneum in the aftermath of the eruption in AD 79; the wooden statues of Madonna di Pugliano and Black Crucifix, both of the 14th century; the font of 1425, one of the oldest outside the cathedral of Naples; the high altar, of the 16th century; the wooden bust of St. Januarius of the 17th century, the wooden pulpit of 1685, coeval to the wooden choir and behind the altar. Most of the paintings were made by local artists in the 16th and 17th centuries.

The Madonna di Pugliano is since worshipped, but before the statue of the 14th century the painted Byzantine-like Madonna di Ampellone was venerated. The main patronal festival is on 15 August, Assumption Day. A special worship is dedicated to St. Januarius, that is co-patron of Ercolano; the statue of the saint has always been carried in procession during the eruptions of Mt. Vesuvius toward the lava front. A bust of St. Januarius facing Mt. Vesuvius was frequently erected in villas and buildings to protect them by the fury of Mt. Vesuvius.

== Bibliography ==
- Giovanni Guida, La Basilica di Santa Maria a Pugliano in Ercolano, 2016, Nicola Longobardi Editore ISBN 978-88-8090-465-6
- Raffaele Oliviero, S.Maria a Pugliano, Ercolano, Edizioni Pro Ercolano, 1983.
- Mario Carotenuto, Ercolano attraverso i secoli, Napoli, Edizioni del Delfino, 1980.
- Carlo Celano, Notitie del bello, dell'antico e del curioso della città di Napoli, Napoli, 1692.
- Giovanni D'Angelo, 'A Maronna 'e mmiez 'Austo, Ercolano, 2000
