= Archbishop's Palace (Naples) =

Coordinates: 40°51′12.8″N 14°15′34.4″E

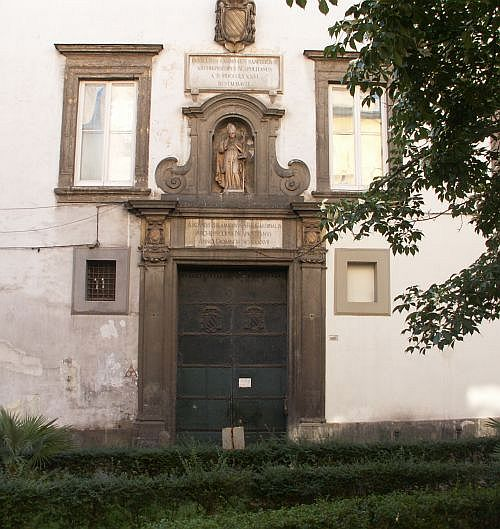
Detail of the facade of the Archbishop's Palace in Naples.

The Archbishop's Palace (Italian: Palazzo Arcivescovile) is a building in Naples, Italy. It is the official residence of the Archbishop of Naples. The building is located on the square largo Donna Regina one block north of the Cathedral of Naples directly across from the church of Donna Regina Nuova. Together, the cathedral and the Archbishop's Palace form a vast, connected complex.

The original structure was built in 1389 at the wishes of Cardinal Archbishop Enrico Capece Minutolo on the site of an old early Christian basilica. The building seen today, however, is largely the result of reconstruction and expansion of the premises under Cardinal Archbishop Ascanio Filomarino, completed in 1654. That reconstruction was most probably the work of architect Bonaventura Presti. The expansion included the clearing of the area directly in front of the building to create a small open square between the Archbishop's Palace and the church of Donna Regina Nuova. The building has an elongated shape and is marked by three stone portals.
