= Santa Maria delle Grazie Maggiore a Caponapoli =

Church building in Naples, Italy

Coordinates: 40.853040°N 14.254000°E

Santa Maria delle Grazie Maggiore a Caponapoli or Santa Maria delle Grazie Maggiore is a church located in the historic center of Naples, Italy.

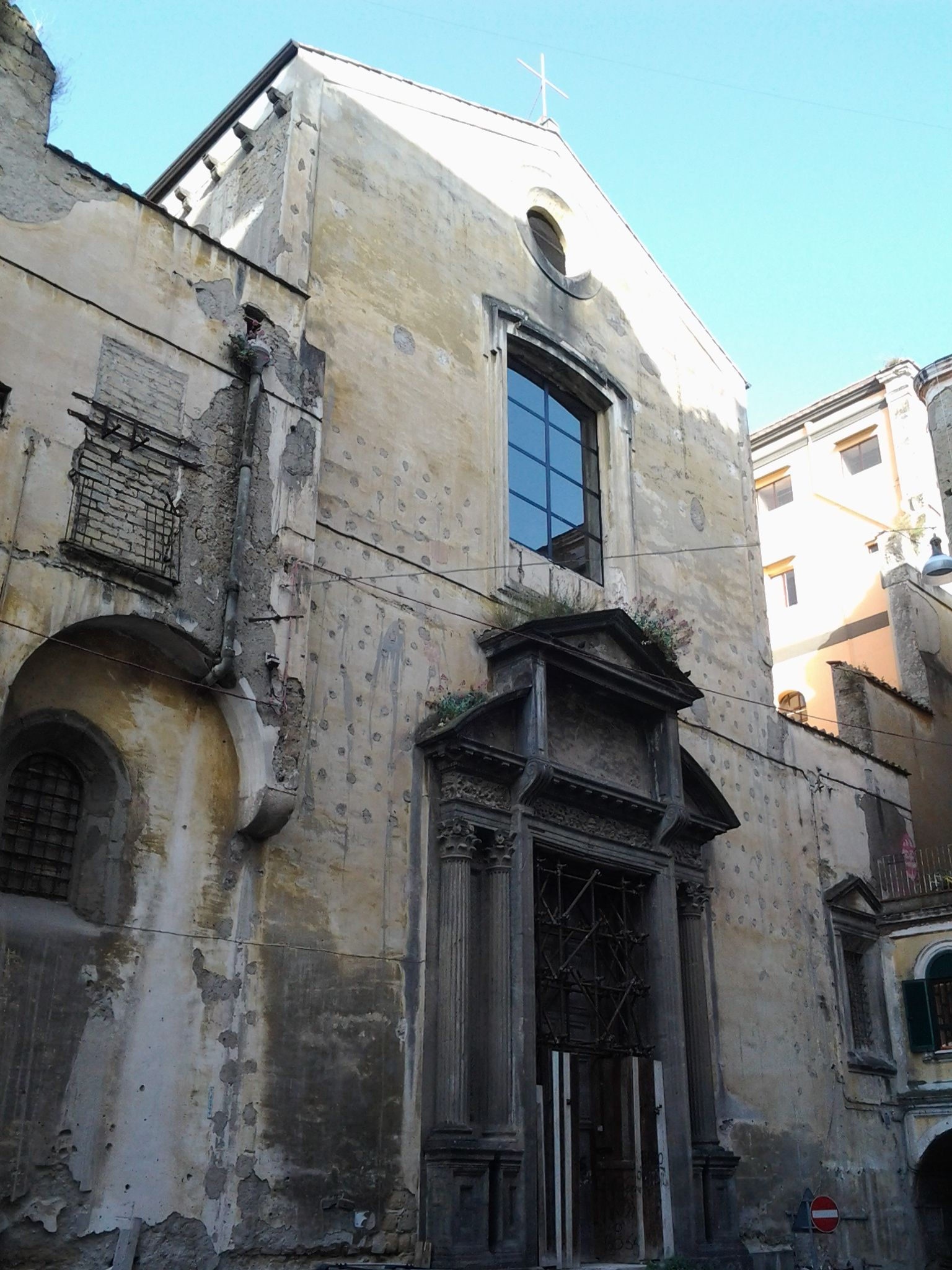
Facade

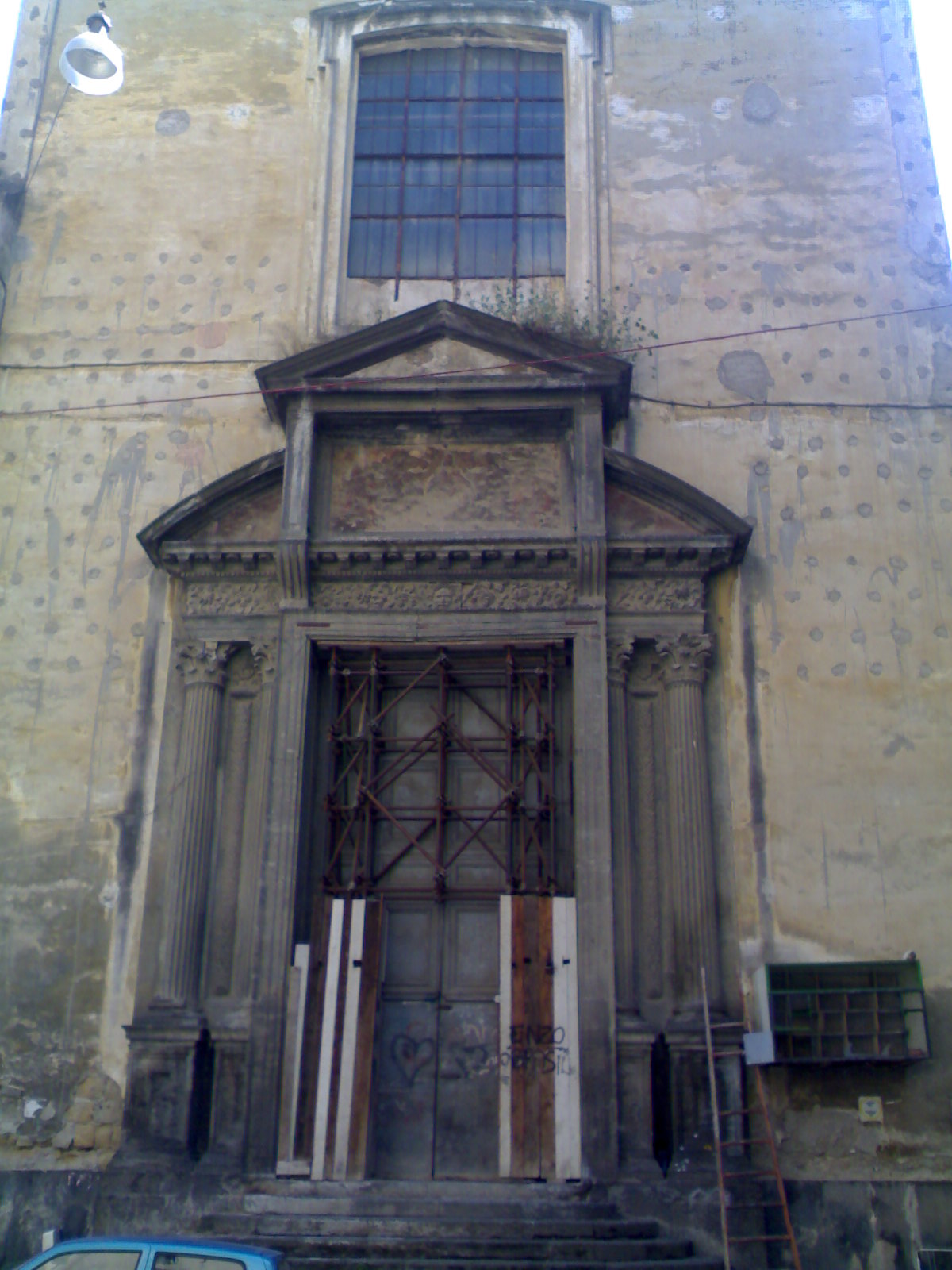
Detail of Entrance portal.

== History ==
Work on the church and adjacent monastery began in 1447, inspired by the beatified Pietro da Pisa. The church was completed in 1473, but from 1516 to 1535 it underwent reconstruction, including the portal by Giovanni Francesco di Palma. Further reconstruction occurred in the 18th century. During the second half of the 18th century, it was a secret meeting place for members of Free Masonry, supposedly sponsored by the monk Serafino Pinzone (who was accused of revolutionary Jacobin leanings in 1794). In 1809, the church was suppressed, and in 1933 joined to the Hospital of Incurables (Ospedale degli Incurabili) under the original order of the monastery. But by the 1970s, the church was in poor state of conservation.

The interior is laid out as a Latin cross with chapels, and houses paintings by Domenico Antonio Vaccaro, Girolamo D'Auria, and a Madonna statue and a Deposition bas-relief by Giovanni da Nola. Among the masterworks in the church is the Renaissance burial monument of the Giovanniello de Cuntco and his wife, Lucrezia Filangieri di Candida (1517), sculpted by Giovanni Tommaso Malvito. Giovanello, secretary to the King of Aragon, reclines above in three dimensions, while his wife sleeps below in an elegant but simple bas-relief.

The presbytery and apse decorated with frescoes by Giovanni Battista Beinaschi and Lorenzo Vaccaro. The right arm of the transept has a Sant'Antonio di Padova by Andrea da Salerno; in the 6th chapel on left, in relief the Incredulity of St Thomas by Girolamo Santacroce, while the first chapel has both the Deposition bas-relief by Giovanni da Nola and a Burial of Galeazzo Giustiniani by an unknown 16th-century artist.

== Bibliography ==
- Vincenzo Regina, Le chiese di Napoli. Viaggio indimenticabile attraverso la storia artistica, architettonica, letteraria, civile e spirituale della Napoli sacra, Newton e Compton editor, Naples 2004.
- Mario Buonoconto, Napoli esoterica: an itinerario nei misteri napoletani, Rome 1999.
