= Santa Maria di Portosalvo, Naples =

Church in Naples, Italy

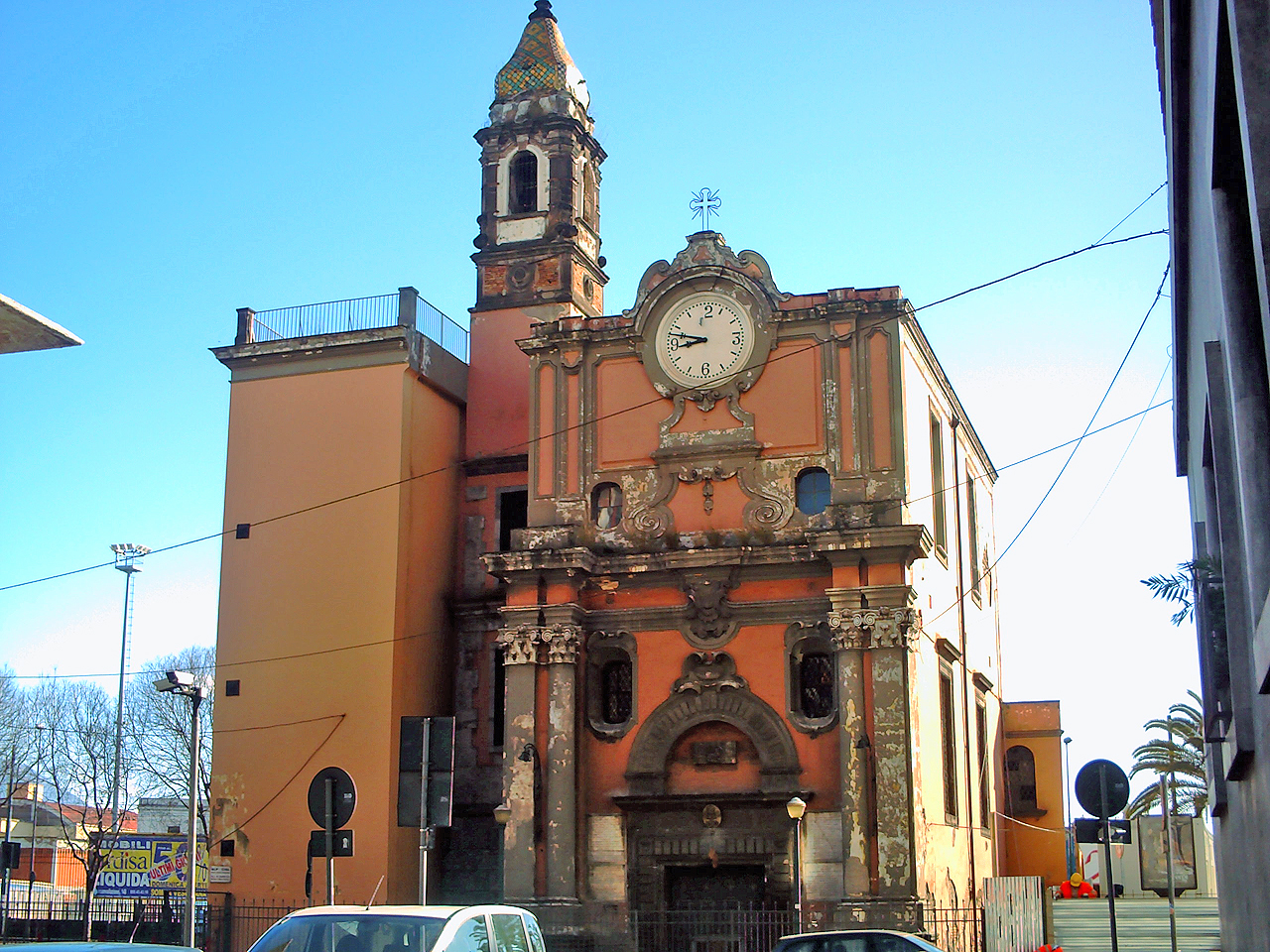
Facade

Santa Maria di Portosalvo or Santa Maria fuori le mura is a former Roman Catholic church in Naples, Italy. It is situated on via Alcide De Gasperi, at the start of via Marina, near the harbour and outside the city walls.

It was founded by the sailor Bernardino Belladonna, who had escaped a shipwreck and wished to set up a lay congregation with a chapel, consisting of himself and other sailors and shipowners. On 31 May 1554, the cardinal gave him permission to do so and on 1 June, Belladonna, Nardo Calvanico, Annibale De Pronillo and brother Albano, were elected governors of the congregation. The site that they chose for their chapel was originally a narrow peninsula outside Porta di Massa. A few months later, work started on the congregation's chapel, which lasted until 1564. The building was then generally decorated between 1564 and 1565 at the cost of 150 ducats - one master Battista built a spiral staircase in the choir.
