= Domenico Auria =

Italian sculptor

Domenico Auria (active 16th century) was an Italian architect and sculptor of the Renaissance period, active in Naples. He was a pupil of Marliano da Nola. He is also known as Giovanni Domenico or Giovan Domenico Auria, or Domenico d'Auria.

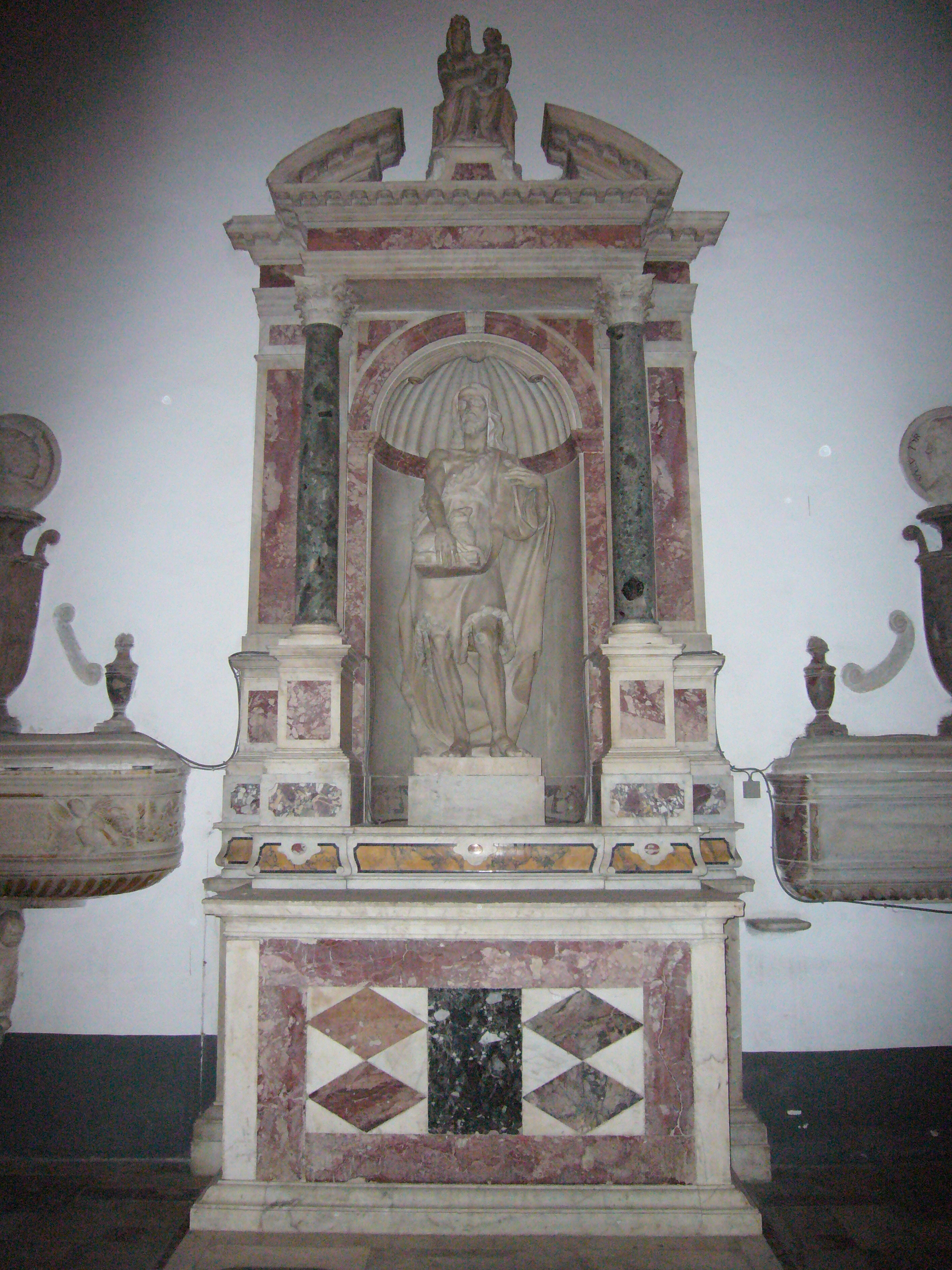
St John the Baptist at San Domenico Maggiore, Naples

== Bibliography ==
- Ticozzi, Stefano (1830). Dizionario degli architetti, scultori, pittori, intagliatori in rame ed in pietra, coniatori di medaglie, musaicisti, niellatori, intarsiatori d'ogni etá e d'ogni nazione' (Volume 1). Milan: Gaetano Schiepatti. p. 91.
