= Sant'Agostino alla Zecca =

Coordinates: 40.849242°N 14.262928°E

Sant Agostino alla Zecca
- Chiesa di Sant' Agostino alla Zecca
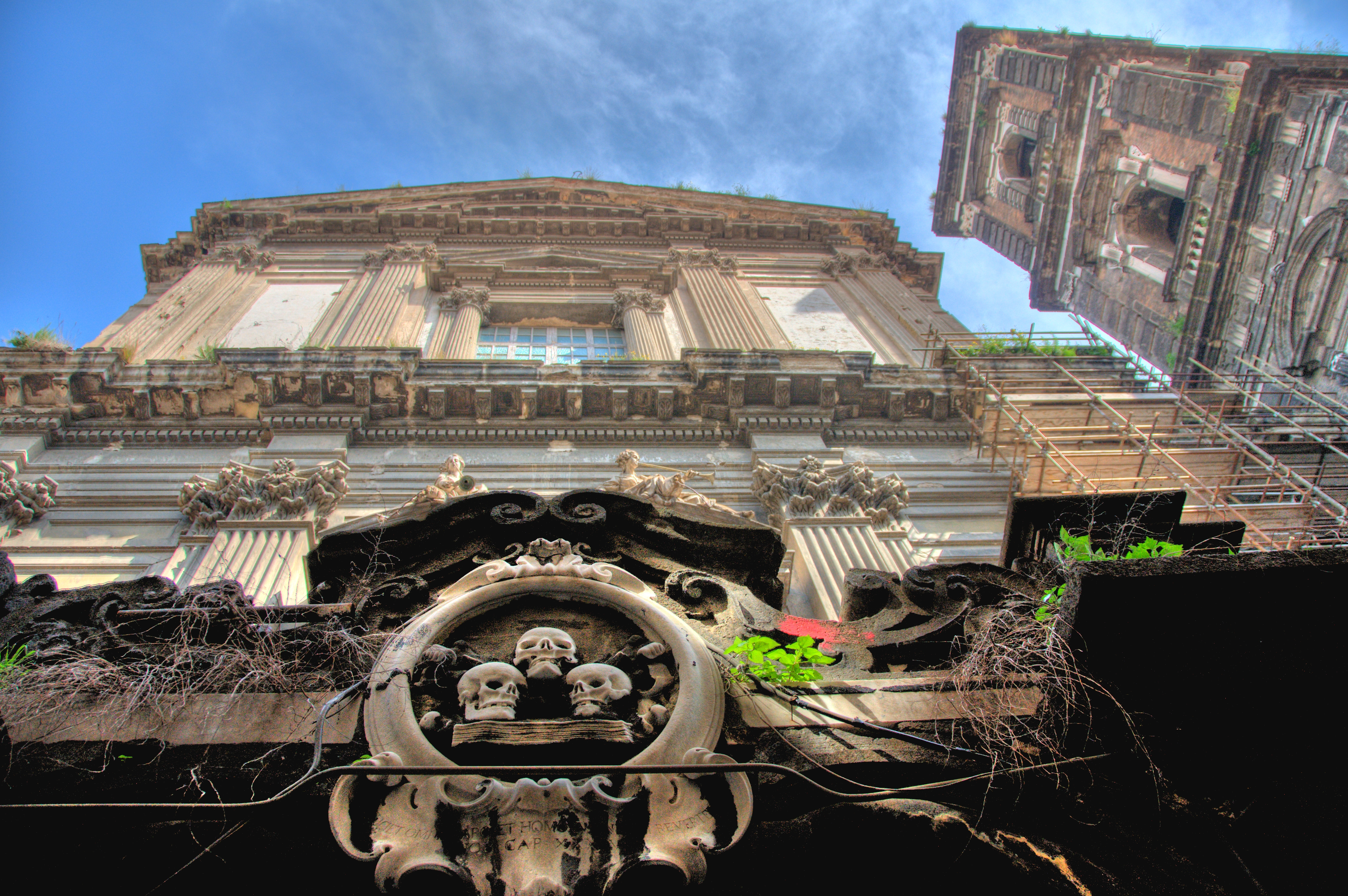
- The façade with skulls
- Sant Agostino alla Zecca
- Location: Naples
- Country: Italy
- Denomination: Roman Catholic

Architecture
- Architectural type: Church

Administration
- Diocese: Roman Catholic Archdiocese of Naples

Sant Agostino alla Zecca, also known as Sant'Agostino Maggiore, is a church in central Naples, Italy.

Originally granted to the Augustinian monks by Robert I of Anjou in 1259. The church underwent extensive reconstruction in the Baroque period by Bartolomeo Picchiati. Its name derives from its location near the former mint. Since the 1980 Irpinia earthquake, it has been closed and is in a poor state of conservation. The interior has frescoes of Giacinto Diano in the Sacristy.

== Sources ==
- entry on church
- Degrading interiors
