= Nicola Vaccaro =

Italian painter

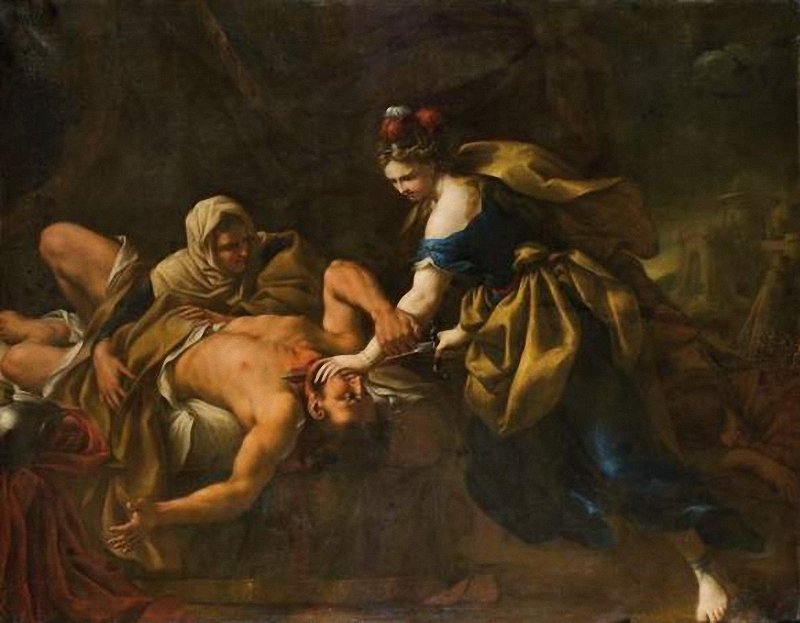
Judith and Holofornes

Nicola Vaccaro (Naples, 13 March 1640 – Naples, 25 May 1709) was an Italian painter, theatre director and opera librettist in Naples. He was known for his religious and allegorical paintings who created easel paintings as frescos. He was a specialist figure painter who regularly collaborated with specialist still life painters on decorative Baroque still lifes and garland paintings. Vaccaro attempted to adapt the stylistic features of 17th-century Neapolitan tradition to the new Classicist and Baroque trends towards increasing Arcadian tendencies. He proposed his own specific form of Academism, aimed at revitalizing the figurative culture in Naples.

== Life ==
He was born in Naples as the son of Andrea Vaccaro and Anna Criscuolo and baptised with the name Tomaso Domenico Nicola. His father was a prominent history painter in 17th century Naples. He first studied drawing with his father. According to the Italian biographer Filippo Boni, Vaccaro liked the palette of Salvator Rosa's landscape paintings and was so successful in mimicking Rosa's style that some of his works were sold as works by Rosa.

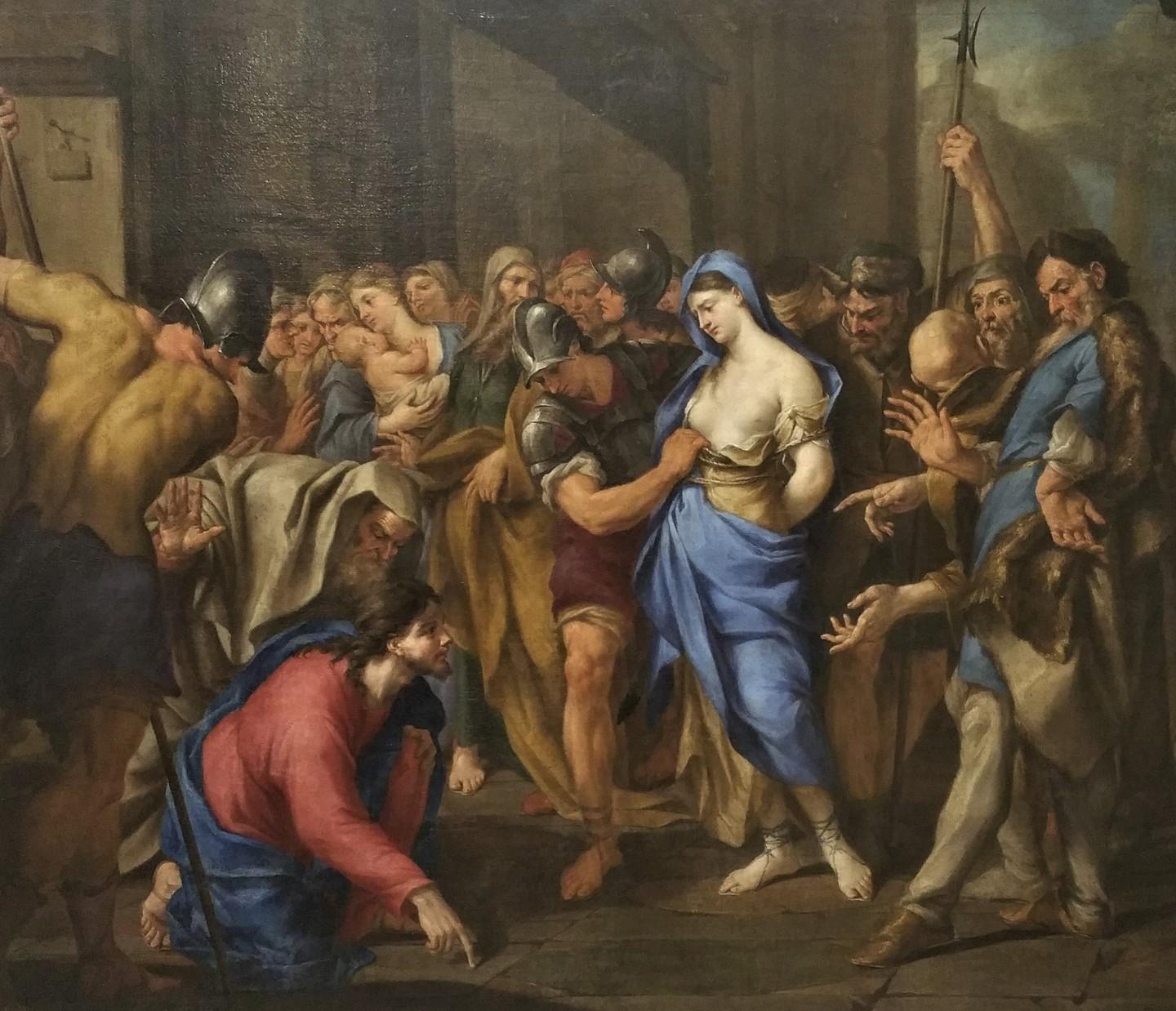
Christ and the adulteress

He went for some time to Rome where he joined the studio of Nicolas Poussin. Nicola Vaccaro married Anna Maria Manecchia, daughter of the painter Gian Giacomo Manecchia, on 10 October 1657. His wife was also active as a painter. Through this marriage, he forged strong ties with well-known artists of the time such as Andrea Malinconico, Giovanni Do and Giacinto de Popoli, for whom he appears often as a witness at weddings or as a godfather at the baptism of their children. The couple's second son Andrea became also an artist and inherited his father's precious collection of drawings. Nicola attended the drawing classes of the Accademia del Nudo (Academy of the Nude), established in Naples in 1664 and of which his father, Andrea, was director and, at the same time, treasurer. Through these classes Nicola acquired good expressive ability in the representation of the anatomy of the human body, gestures and physiognomy.

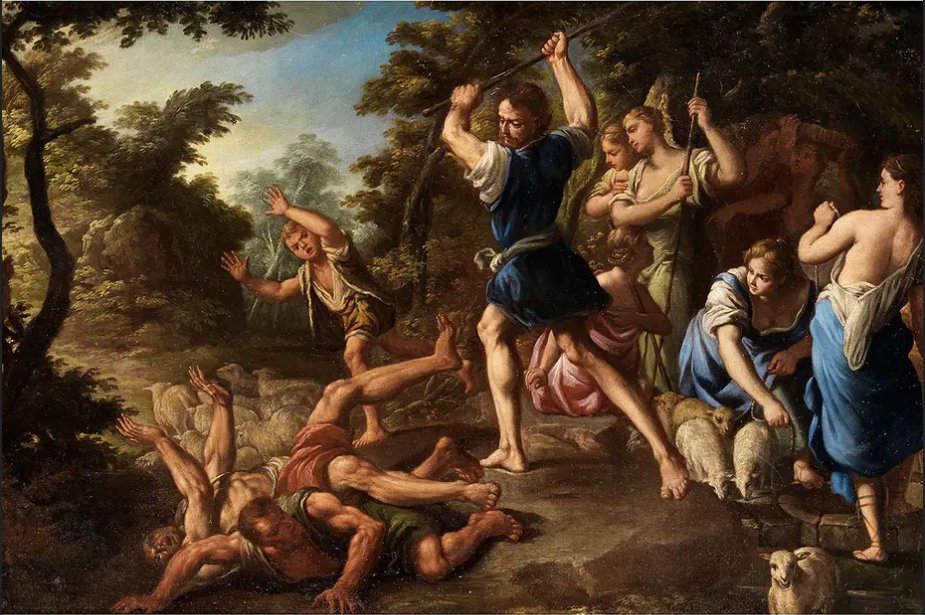
Moses defending the daughters of Jethro

He later fell in love with Giulietta Zuffi, a singer of the theater with whom he had a scandalous relationship. To please her he took up the position of manager at the Teatro di San Bartolomeo, an opera house in Napels, active mainly in the 17th and 18th centuries. He was the administrator, librettist and set designer of the theatre from 1683 to 1689. His mistress Zuffi was during this period the protagonist of the theater seasons. His activity in the field of theater was not separate from his artistic and existential trajectory, but was inseparable from the rest of his pictorial production. He wrote libretti for the theatre productions. He designed the theatre sets for which he likely also painted some of the decorations. He devised a new system for changing the sets. The theatrical activity of Nicola Vaccaro coincided with the famous season of Alessandro Scarlatti, an important moment for the history of music in Naples. Vaccaro ensured the collaboration of the great musician throughout the course of his management, thus demonstrating a modern managerial sensitivity. Vaccaro produced 18 shows during his tenure. All the works were first performed at the Royal Palace and then at the public Teathre of San Bartolomeo. He was kept so busy that his output as a painter was significantly reduced. Despite his hard work his tenure as manager of the theatre was not successful.

Vaccaro's first wife died around 1690 and he married a second time.

== Work ==
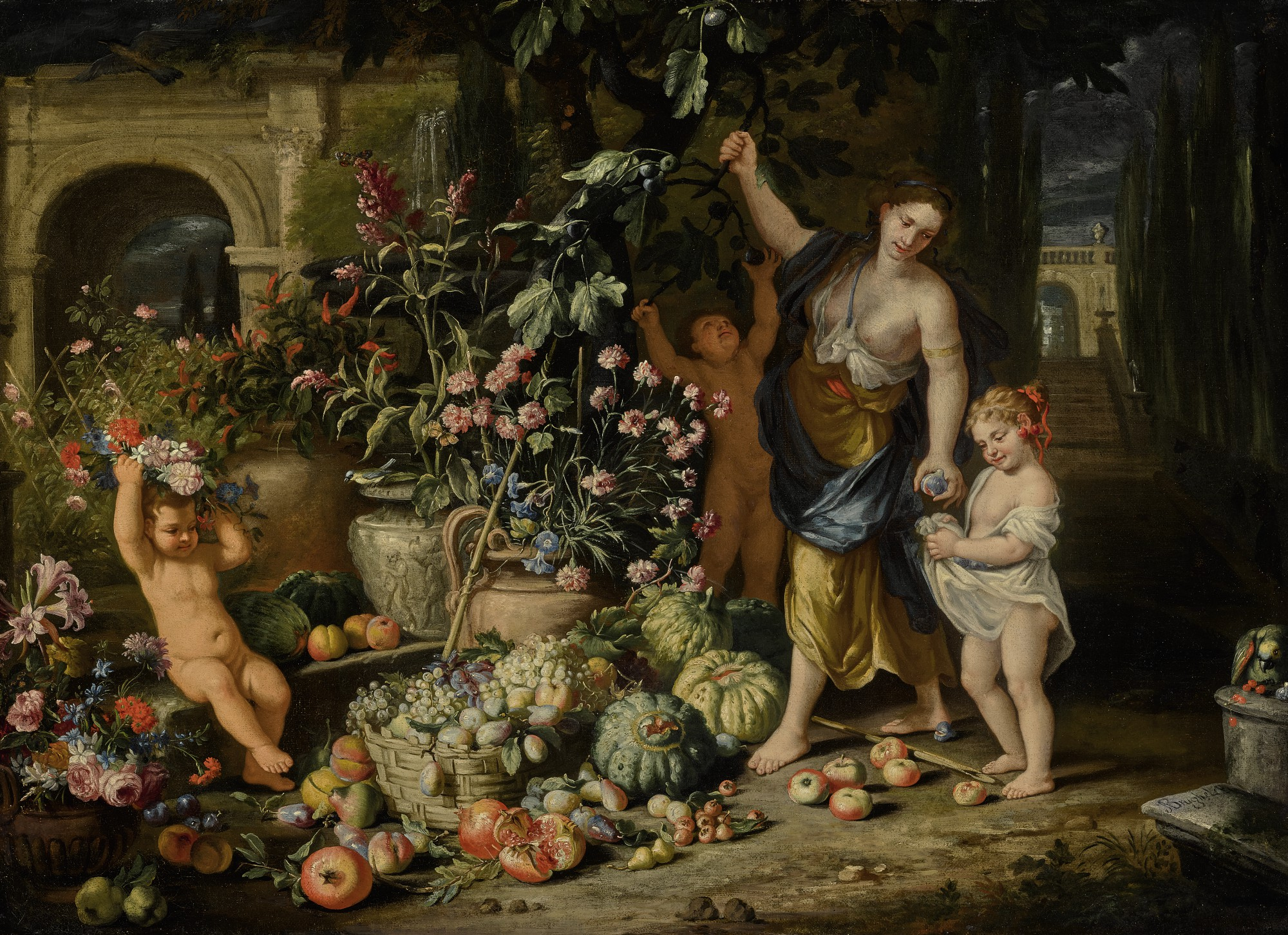
Young woman picking figs with three children in a terraced garden

Nicola Vaccaro was a versatile painter, who covered a wide range of subjects including religious, historical and mythological themes. He was also able to integrate still lifes and landscapes in his paintings in collaboration with specialist painters such as Abraham Brueghel, Francesco Della Quosta, Aniello Ascione and Andrea Belvedere. He painted on various carriers including wood panels, copper, brass and crystal, and also practised fresco painting.

Like his father, his work is characterised by its eclecticism. Among the Neapolitan artists, he can be regarded as an alternative to the trends represented respectively by Luca Giordano and Francesco Solimena. Vaccaro attempted to adapt the stylistic features of the 17th-century Neapolitan tradition to the new Classicist and Baroque trends with their emphasis on Arcadian landscapes.

His work can be regarded as an expression of a new academism in art. With Francesco Di Maria, Giacomo Farelli and Andrea Malinconico, he regarded the starting points of their working method as the practice of drawing, the knowledge of human anatomy and the study of the great masters of the past. In addition they relied on their thorough knowledge of the classics, to achieve an original interpretation of their subjects. His style gradually lost its initial formal rigidity and academic composure of the beginnings in favor of a language based on the grace of gestures, the serenity of the mood, on the studied compositional proportions.

His clientele was of two kinds: the religious institutions of his region and private clients.
