= Francesco di Maria =

Italian Baroque painter (1623–1690)

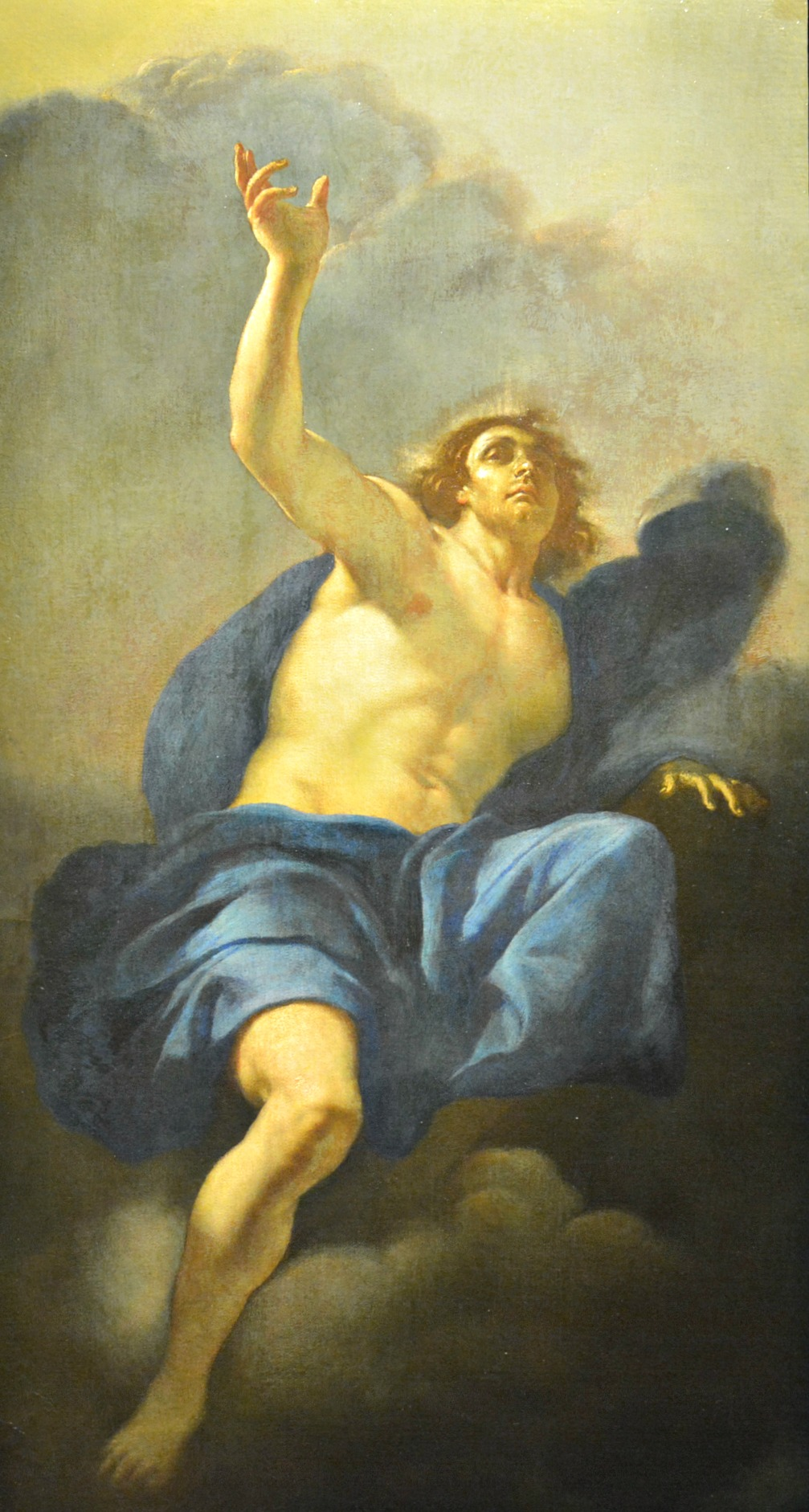
- Christ the Saviour, Palazzo Zevallos, Naples
- Born: 1623; Naples, Kingdom of Naples
- Died: 23 May 1690 (aged 66–67); Naples, Kingdom of Naples
- Education: Domenichino
- Known for: Painting
- Movement: Baroque
- Patrons: John Cecil, 5th Earl of Exeter

Francesco di Maria (1623–1690) was an Italian painter of the Baroque period, active mainly in Naples. A dedicated pupil of Domenichino, di Maria became the most fervent champion and defender of classicism, strict draftsmanship (disegno), and rigorous composition in Naples during the second half of the 17th century. Di Maria is famous for his fierce academic rivalry with his contemporary, Luca Giordano. While Giordano championed a rapid, brilliant, and color-driven early Rococo style, di Maria defended his master's Baroque classicism.

== Biography ==
Francesco de Maria was born in Naples in 1623. He was taught by his father, but later became a follower of Domenichino (in Naples 1630–41). After Domenichino's death, di Maria moved to Rome, where he met Andrea Sacchi and Nicolas Poussin and formed close ties with Salvator Rosa and Pietro del Pò. His interest in the Old Masters was encouraged by Salvator Rosa. Yet di Maria also responded to the more painterly art of Giovanni Lanfranco, Luca Giordano and Mattia Preti, and his art unites the colour of Giordano with an emphasis on disegno and on intellectual complexity.

His early works include a St. Anne (1640–53; Girolamini, Naples) and The Drummer (Cefalù, Museo Mandralisca). A series of altarpieces included the Calvary and the Ecstasy of St. Teresa of Avila (both 1660; Naples, San Giuseppe delle Scalze a Pontecorvo) and the monumental St. Gregory Thaumaturgus (c. 1660) for San Gregorio Armeno, where di Maria also frescoed a chapel with scenes from the Life of St. Gregory Thaumaturgus (1660–70). These works suggest the influence of Charles Mellin (in Naples 1643–7), Simon Vouet and the Bolognese school of the Carracci and Giovanni Lanfranco.

In 1666, alongside Andrea Vaccaro, di Maria founded an influential academy of the nude (Accademia del nudo) in Naples to preserve classical anatomical drawing principles. The academy focused on figure drawing (disegno dal nudo), human anatomy, proportions, perspective, optics, history, and mythology. It served as a vital training ground for the next generation of Neapolitan painters, most notably Francesco Solimena, Giacomo del Pò, ed Andrea Malinconico, who studied directly under Di Maria. After Vaccaro's death in 1670, Di Maria succeeded him as the academy's rector.

Di Maria enjoyed a high reputation as a portrait painter. In this field, he surpassed his fierce rival, Luca Giordano. Bernardo de' Dominici compared him to Carlo Sellitto and Battistello Caracciolo, considered the foremost Neapolitan portrait painters of the Baroque period. Only a few of his portraits survive, the most notable of which is that of Cardinal Ascanio Filomarino (Florence, Palazzo Corsini). Di Maria was a close friend of the scholar Giuseppe Valletta, who introduced him to Neapolitan intellectual circles and members of the local and foreign nobility, including John Cecil, 5th Earl of Exeter, who commissioned him portraits, biblical scenes and mythological pictures. Among di Maria’s last works were frescoes (1684) in San Luigi di Palazzo, Naples. Di Maria died in Naples on 23 May 1690, aged 67, and was buried in San Giuseppe Maggiore dei Falegnami. Despite his style being less fashionable than Giordano's sweeping Baroque frescoes at the time, di Maria served as a mentor to the next generation of masters – including Francesco Solimena, Giacomo Farelli, and Paolo de Matteis – who eventually integrated his classical restraint into 18th-century Neapolitan art.

== External link ==
- "Maria, Francesco di". Benezit Dictionary of Artists. Oxford: Oxford University Press. 2011. doi:10.1093/benz/9780199773787.article.B00116645.
