= Malinconico =

Malinconico can refer to:

- Malinconico (music), performance direction in music meaning melancholy
- Nicola Malinconico (1663–1721), Neapolitan painter
- Andrea Malinconico (1624-1698), Neapolitan painter

== See also ==
- Melancholic Autumn (Italian: Malinconico autunno), a 1958 Italian-Spanish melodrama film
