= Spanish quarter =

Spanish Quarter may refer to:

- Quartieri Spagnoli, a historic district of Naples, Italy
- Spanish Quarter (Erice), a 17th-century barracks in Erice, Sicily
