= Fattoruso =

Fattoruso is a surname of Italian origin. Notable persons with that surname include:

- Francisco Fattoruso (born 1979), Uruguayan musician
- Giuseppe Fattoruso, Italian painter of the Baroque period
- Hugo Fattoruso (born 1943), Uruguayan musician
- Osvaldo Fattoruso (1948–2012), Uruguayan musician
- Rodolfo M. Fattoruso (born 1953), Uruguayan literary critic
