= San Giuseppe delle Scalze a Pontecorvo =

Church in Naples, Italy

Coordinates: 40.849531°N 14.247200°E

San Giuseppe delle Scalze a Pontecorvo is a church, located in Salita Pontecorvo, in the historical center of Naples, Italy.

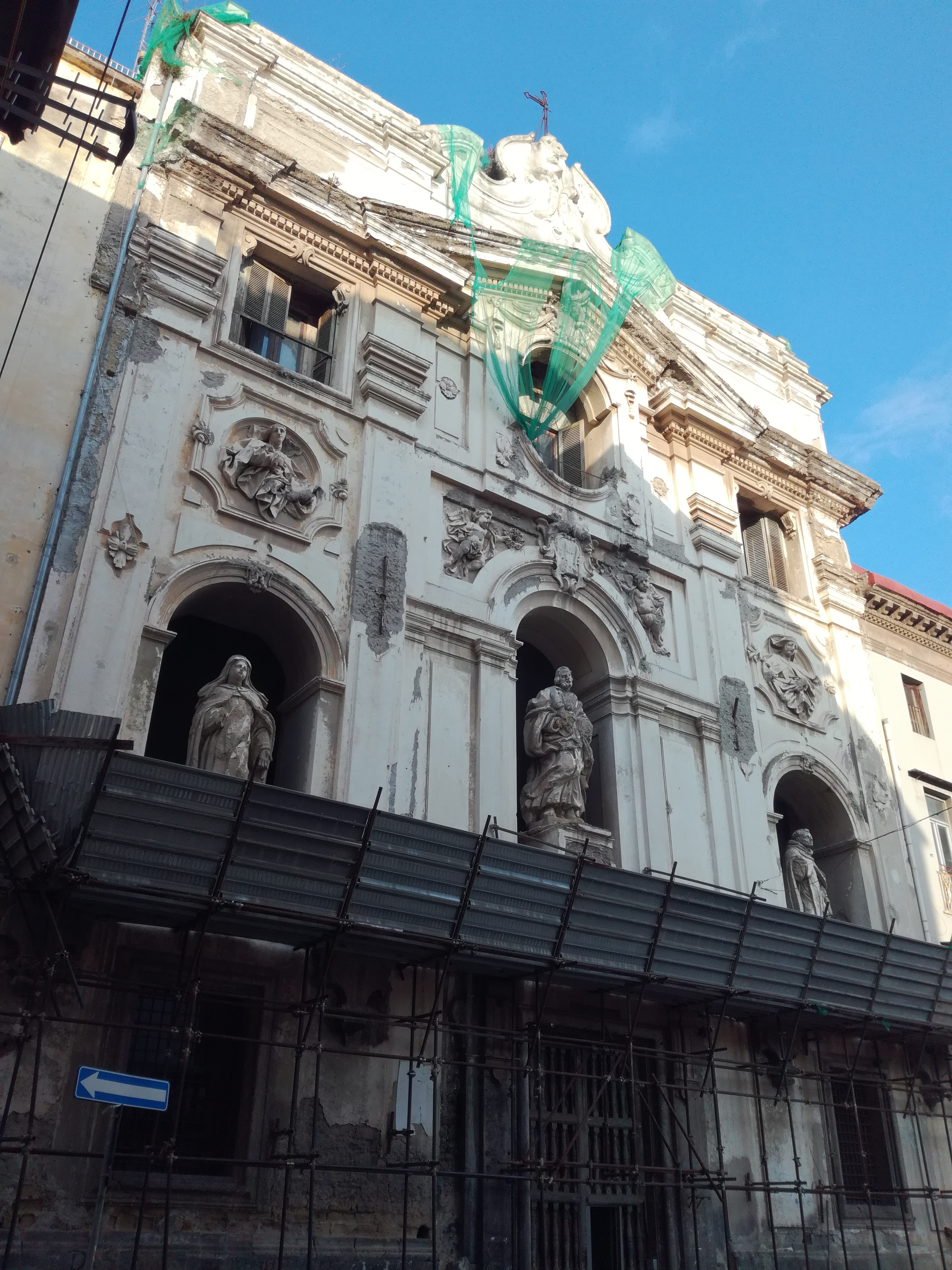
Facade

The church was built in 1619 in the site where the Palazzo Spinelli a Pontecorvo stood, and was rebuilt in 1643 and 1660 by Cosimo Fanzago. Decoration in the exterior and interior were added in 1709 by Giovanni Battista Manni. The church first was linked to Tersian monks, and then to Barnabite priests. The earthquake of 1980 brought down the frescoed ceiling, and failure to protect the fragments led to their degradation, as well as the interior. Vandalism further despoiled the interior or marble and balustrades. The building has not been reconstructed or deconsecrated.

The interior has a Greek cross plan with four corner chapels. Much of the interior artwork has been removed, including a St Joseph and Young Jesus (1660) by Luca Giordano, and now in the Museo di Capodimonte. A Calvary and a St Teresa and St Peter of Alcantara by Francesco di Maria are now kept in the Museum of San Martino.

== Bibliography ==
- Antonio Terraciano, Andrea Russo, Le chiese di Napoli. Censimento e brevi recensioni delle 448 chiese storiche della città di Napoli, Lorenzo Giunta Editor, 1999.
