= Pontano Chapel =

Chapel in Naples

Coordinates: 40.850124°N 14.254516°E

The Pontano Chapel or Cappella dei Pontano is a Renaissance-style chapel in central Naples, Italy, on Via Tribunali, just in front of and obscuring the left lower façade of the church of Santa Maria Maggiore alla Pietrasanta.

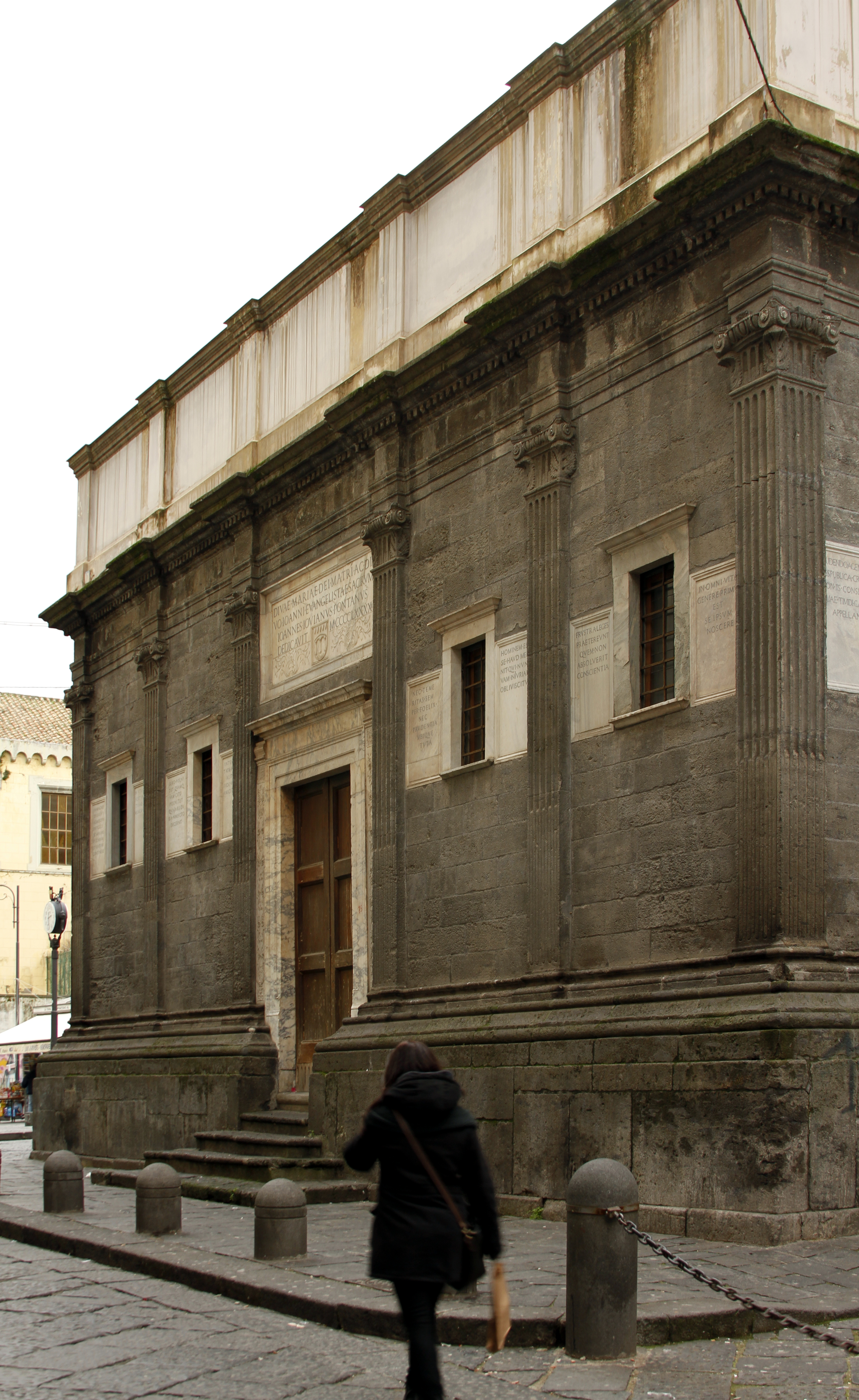
Façade of Pontana Chapel

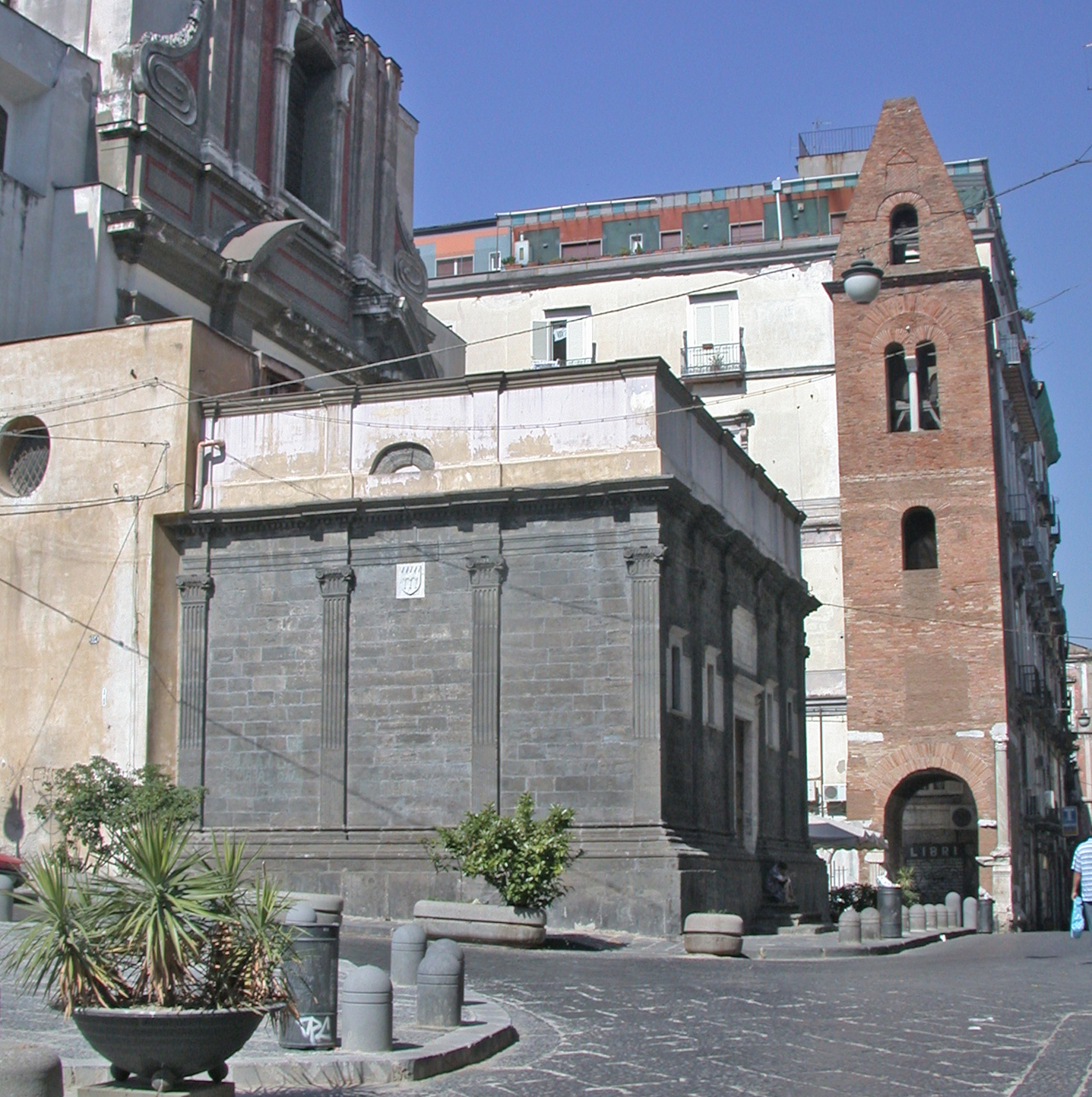
Chapel and bell tower.

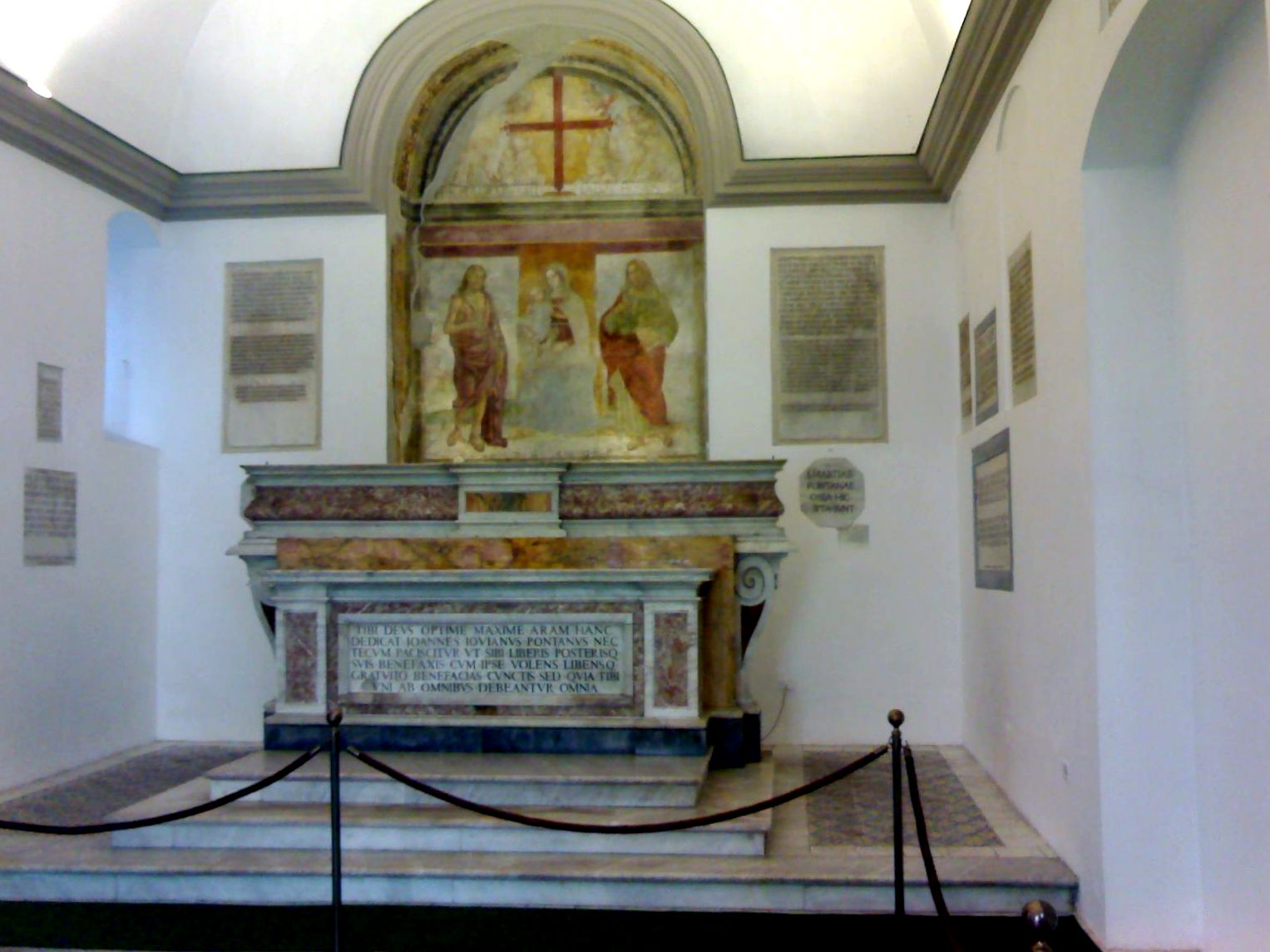
Altar of Cappella Pontano.

The chapel was built in 1492 by humanist Giovanni Pontano as funerary chapel for his beloved wife Adriana Sassone. The architects, the brothers Giocondo and Francesco di Giorgio, made the building have Vitruvian proportions for length and width. The serene façade, seemingly out of place with the bright dynamic façade of Santa Maria Maggiore, is constructed of grey piperno rock with pilasters. The interior has maiolica flooring. Behind the altar is a fresco of the Madonna with Saints John the Baptist and John the Evangelist (c. 1492) attributed to Francesco Cicino da Caiazzo.
