= Quartieri Spagnoli =

Part of the city of Naples in Italy

Coordinates: 40°50′27″N 14°14′47″E

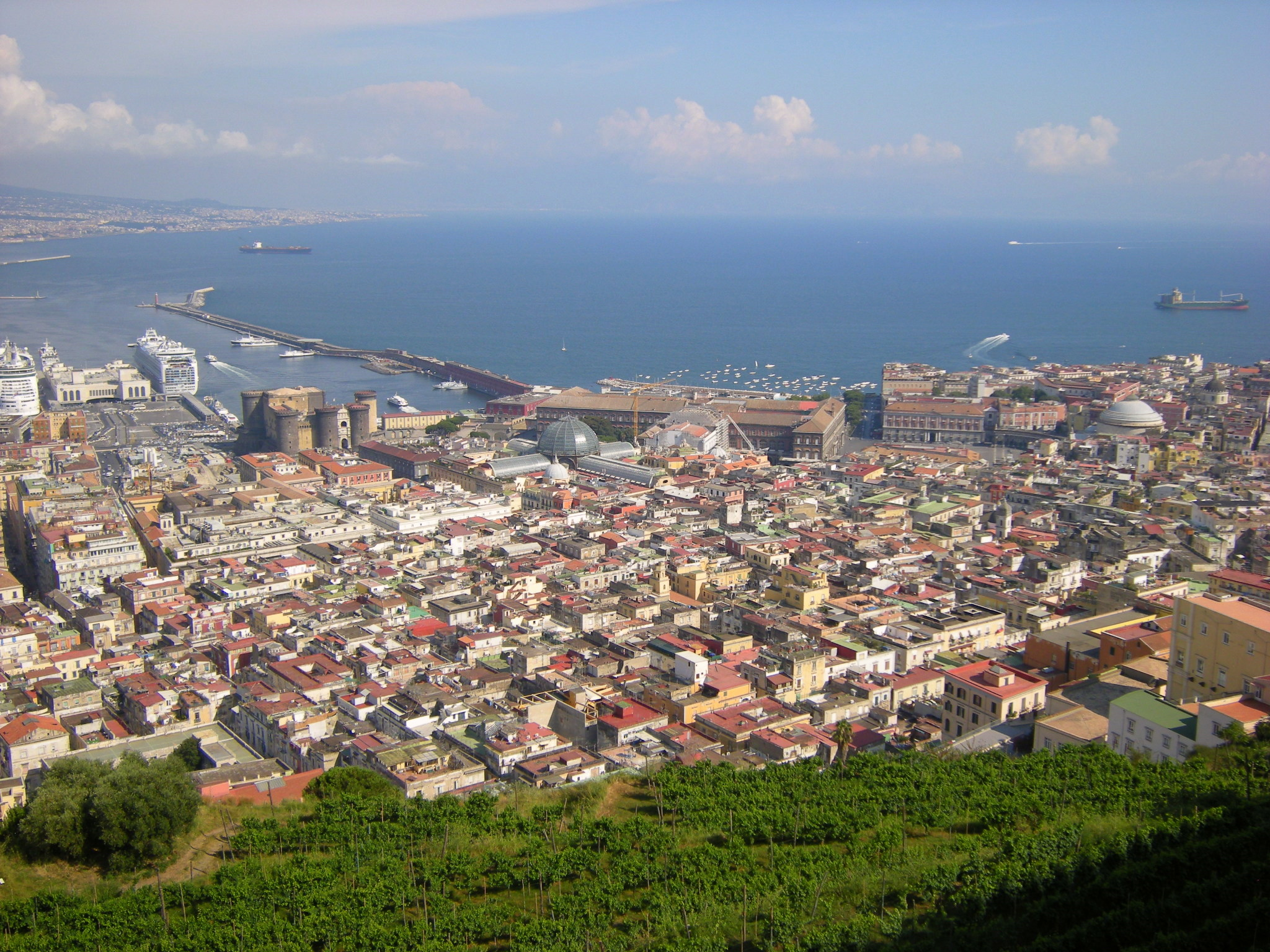
View from Certosa di San Martino, Vomero district

Quartieri Spagnoli (Neapolitan: Quartieri Spagnuoli; lit. 'Spanish Barracks') is an area of the city of Naples, Italy. The area, encompassing c. 800,000 square metres, consists of a grid of around eighteen streets by twelve, including a population of some 14,000 inhabitants.

The Quartieri were created in the 16th century to house Spanish garrisons, hence the name, whose role was to quench revolts from the Neapolitan population.

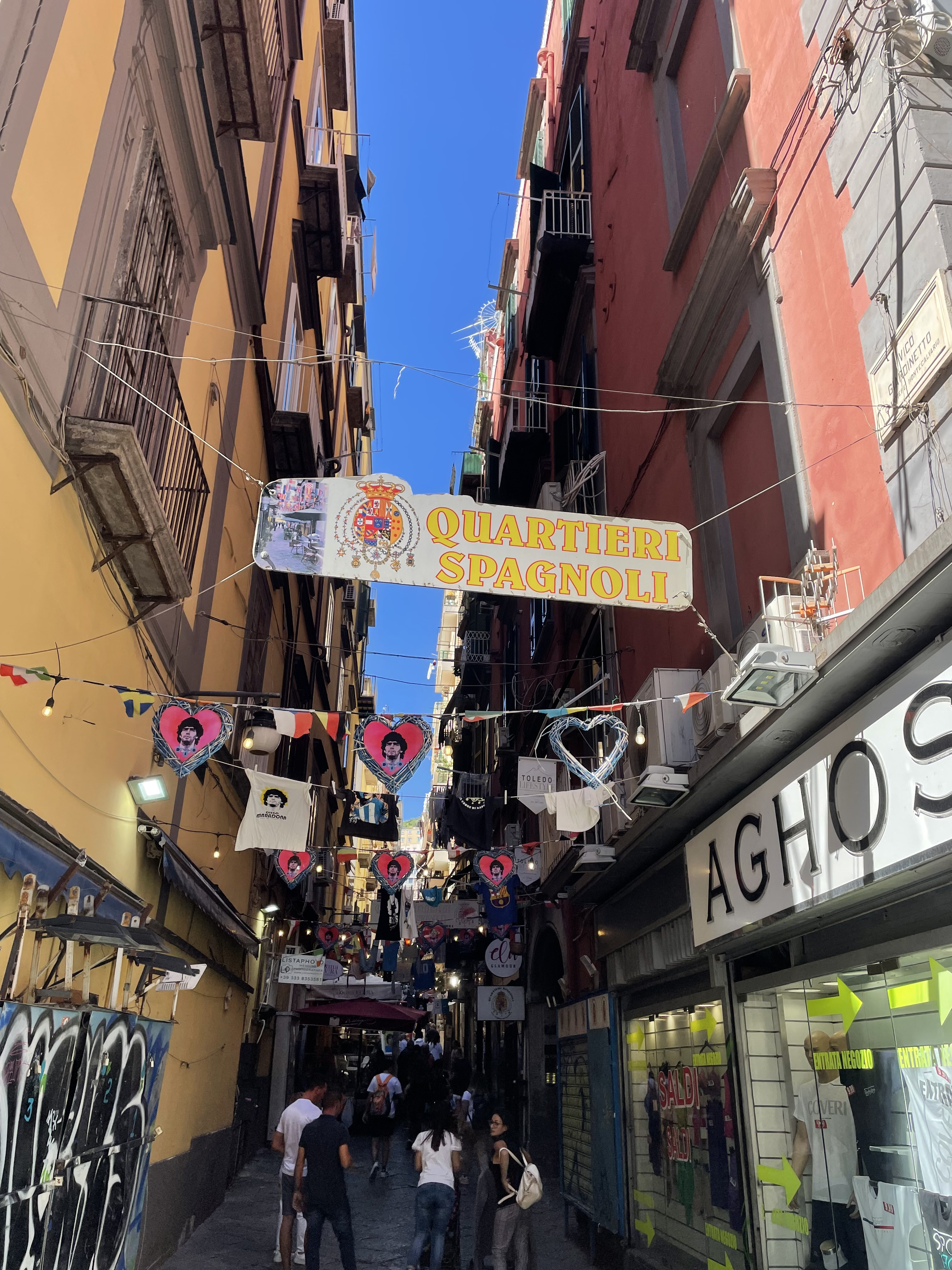
Entrance to the Spanish Quarter from via Toledo

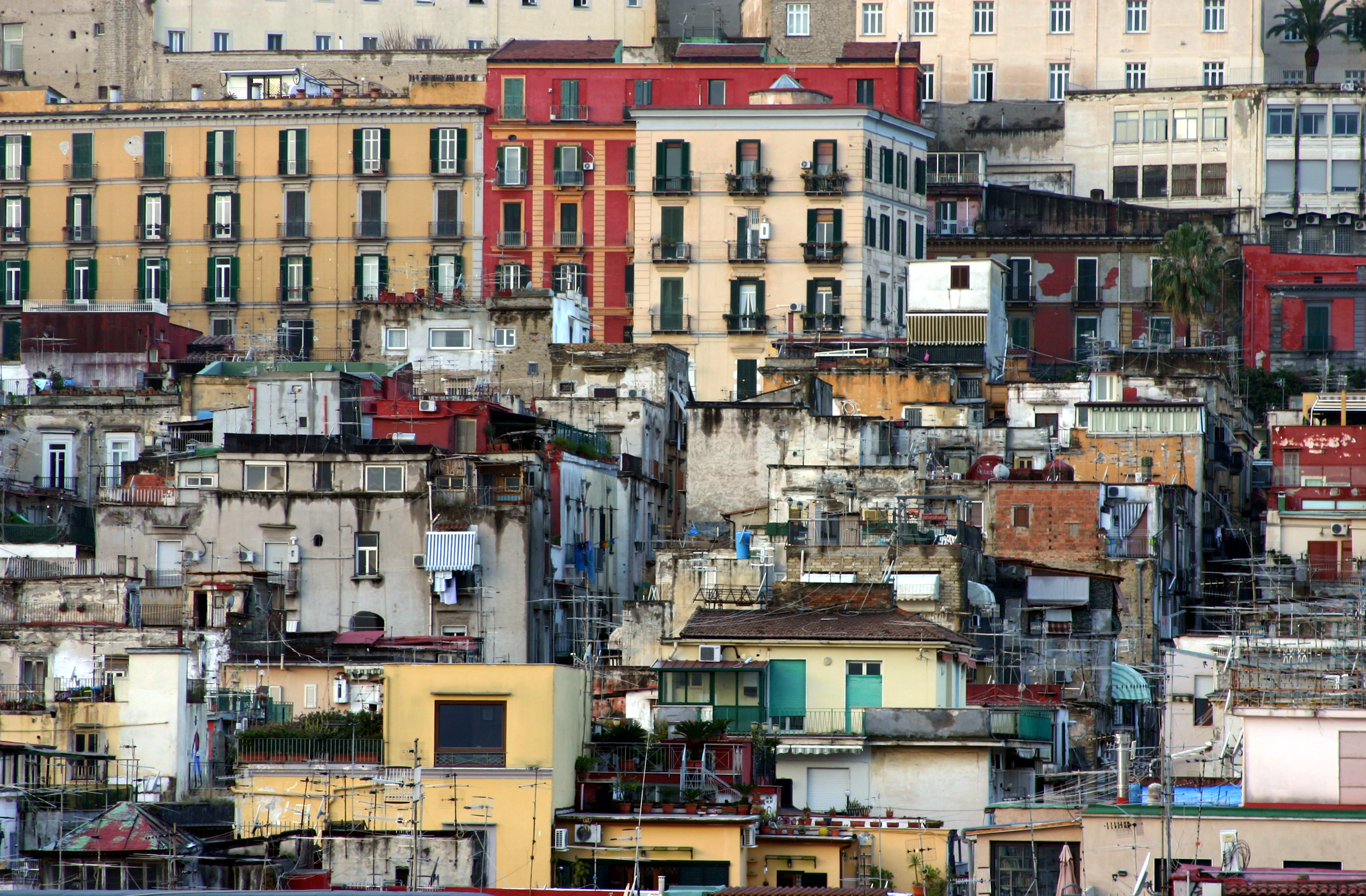
Spanish Quarter as seen from Renaissance Mediterraneo

== History ==
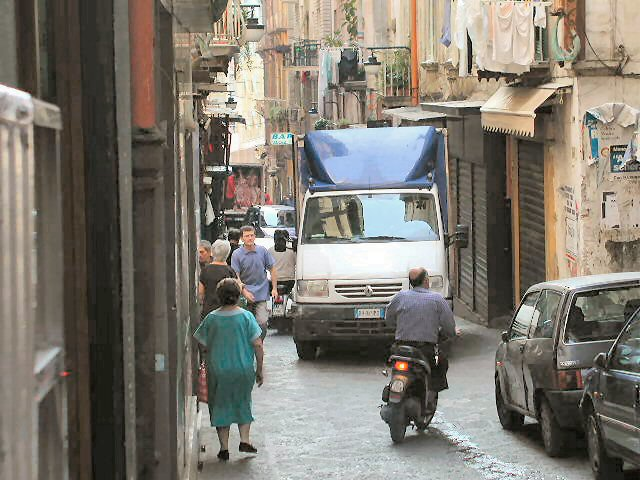
One of a network of busy, narrow streets that form the majority of thoroughfares traversing the historic Spanish Quarter of Naples.

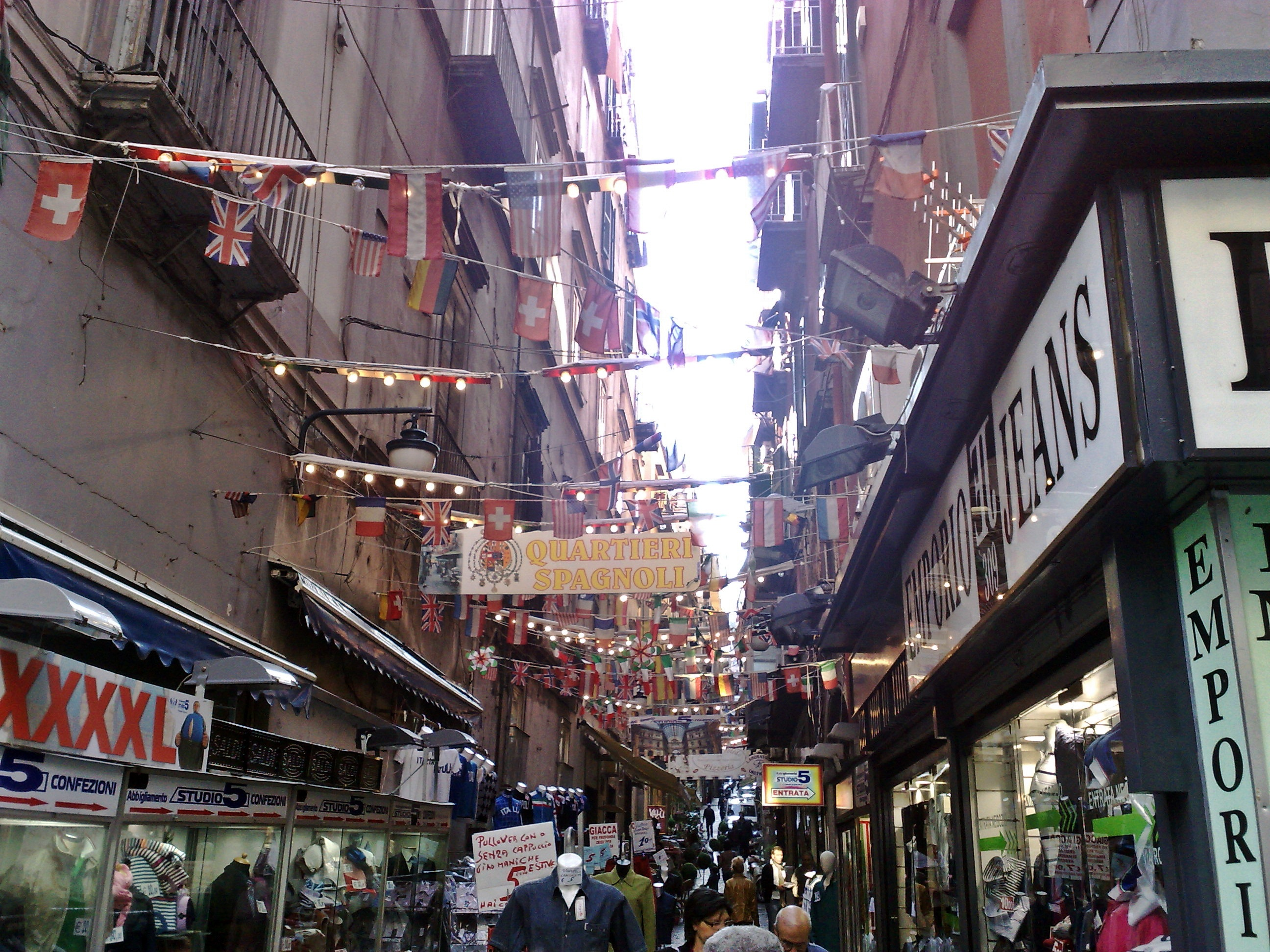
Quartieri Spagnoli

The urban area known as "quartieri" (referring to the military term) is characterized. from an urban standpoint, by a rectangular structure that descends from the above dominating St. Elmo's Castle, with the intent of creating of housing destined to host the guards of the fortress. It rose around the 16th Century, at the hands of Siena architect Giovanni Benincasa and the Napolitan Ferdinando Manlio, by the will of Pedro de Toledo, the Viceroy King at the time, to create a neighborhood of Spanish military garrisons destined to the repression of eventual revolts of the Neapolitan population, or as a temporary home for the soldiers that passed through Naples directed to other locations of conflict and, at the same time, as a popular structure equipped to give lodging to the many locals who, in those years, came from the surrounding countryside and settled in the reigning capital city.

From its inception, the area known as "Quartieri Spagnoli", equally due to an elevated density between the population and number of buildings, criminality, gambling, and above all prostitution were present, which was particularly tied to the offering of leisure activities uttered by the locals to the soldiers staying in the quarters or passing through. Even with the declaration by the Viceroy King of Naples don Pedro de Toledo, of some specific legal acts created to dismantle the leisure activities, the neighborhood remained as it was, shedding its original function, thus staying as an area of great social difficulty within the Parthenope city.

Throughout the anthropic evolution of the area, from 1500 to 1700, the military was progressively less present while a " high percentage of immigrants from surrounding areas, wove into the area, particularly from the service industry. Artisans, especially shoemakers and dressmakers, were present in droves". Beginning in the 18th Century, this urban area became characterized (as does the other areas of the city) by a strong fragmentation and disparity of labor and entrepreneurial activities. Until the 19th Century, the proximity with via Toledo, home of important administrative and financial offices (Banco delle Due Sicilie, Borsa, Gran Corte dei Conti), incised significantly on the social-professional composition of the inhabitants of the area, which took on the resemblance of a residential area, given the presence of nobles, laborers, owners of the middle class. With the unification of Italy, it became more proletariat in a general shift to a marginal legality, which in some ways prolonged during the course of the Century that followed.

Even with the propositions "to do away with" the neighborhood brought about in urban proposals of reclamation in the first half of the 20th Century, the area has stayed unaltered, and to this day, the neighborhood has 14.000 inhabitants in 4,000 families spread out over a surface area of about 80 hectares. Due to the particular structure of the ground, as in other historical neighborhoods of the city, it's possible, and not rare, for the ground to sink. During the night between the 22 and the 23 of September, 2009, in vico San Carlo, probably caused by torrential rains, the street sank. and a chasm of almost 20 meters in length formed. This provoked the immediate evacuation for some buildings and the closure of the San Carlo alle Mortelle church.

== Quartieri Spagnoli Today ==
In September 2012, next to Quartieri Spagnoli the Toledo metro station Line 1 Naples Metro Station opened During the excavation for the construction of the second exit of the station, Montecalvario Square, some traces of previous civilization were uncovered dating back to the Bronze Age from circa 1500 a.C. In Santa Maria degli Angeli Square, on the other hand, traces of Mediaeval Naples were found.

Following the station's opening, the district experienced a sharp increase in tourism, drawn by its historic street grid, open-air markets, and expanding restaurant scene . In recent years, the area has also attracted domestic and international university students due to its central location and proximity to several Neapolitan campuses .

== Historical sites ==
The Spanish Quarters constitute a historically and artistically significant nucleus of the city of Naples, offering various insights into local popular culture and Neapolitan lifestyle. Examples include the presence of small artisan workshops, the characteristic bassi Napoletani (traditional ground-floor dwellings), and narrow, dimly lit alleys featuring steep staircases and clothes hanging out to dry between buildings. Among the main monuments of interest in the district are:

- Church of the Immacolata Concezione e Purificazione di Maria de' nobili in Montecalvario
- Church of San Carlo alle Mortelle
- Church of San Mattia
- Church of Santa Maria della Concezione a Montecalvario
- Church of Santa Maria della Lettera
- Church of Santa Maria della Mercede a Montecalvario
- Church of Santa Maria Francesca delle Cinque Piaghe
- Church of Sant'Anna di Palazzo
- Church of Santa Maria del Rosario a Portamedina
- Church of Santa Maria della Concordia
- Church of Santa Maria delle Grazie a Toledo
- Convent and church of Santa Maria dello Splendore
- Church of Santa Maria Ognibene
- Church of Santa Teresella degli Spagnoli
- Church of the Trinità dei Pellegrini
- Church of the Santissima Trinità degli Spagnoli

Palazzo Anastasio Palazzo Cattaneo-Barberini Palazzo D'Afflitto-Imperiali Palazzo Della Posta (via Pasquale Scura 8) Palazzo in via Speranzella 123 Palazzo in via Trinità degli Spagnoli n.5 Palazzo in vico Tre Re a Toledo n.60 Palazzo Majorana Palazzo di Magnocavallo Palazzo Petrone Palazzo Pisacane Palazzo Positano (via Pasquale Scura n.72) Palazzo Ruffo di Baranello Palazzo Sifola
