= Aniello Ascione =

Italian painter

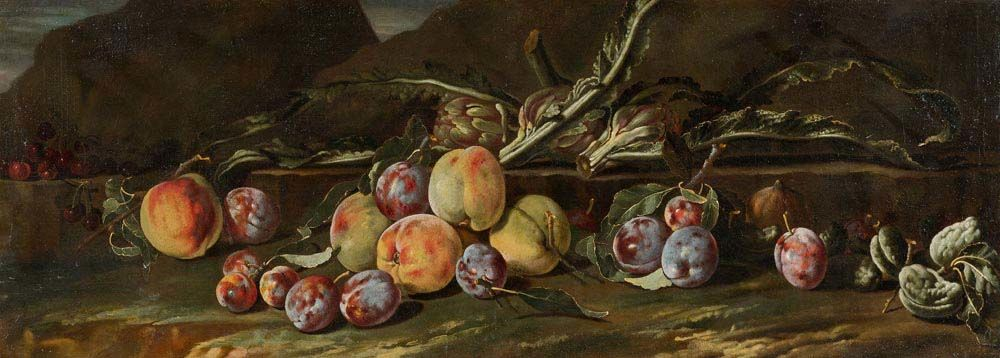
Still life in a landscape with peaches, plums and artichoke

Aniello Ascione (fl 1680 –1708) was an Italian painter of still lifes. He is regarded as an important representative of the Flemish style of Baroque still life painting and a follower of the Flemish painter Abraham Brueghel who worked in Naples in the final quarter of the 17th century.

== Life ==
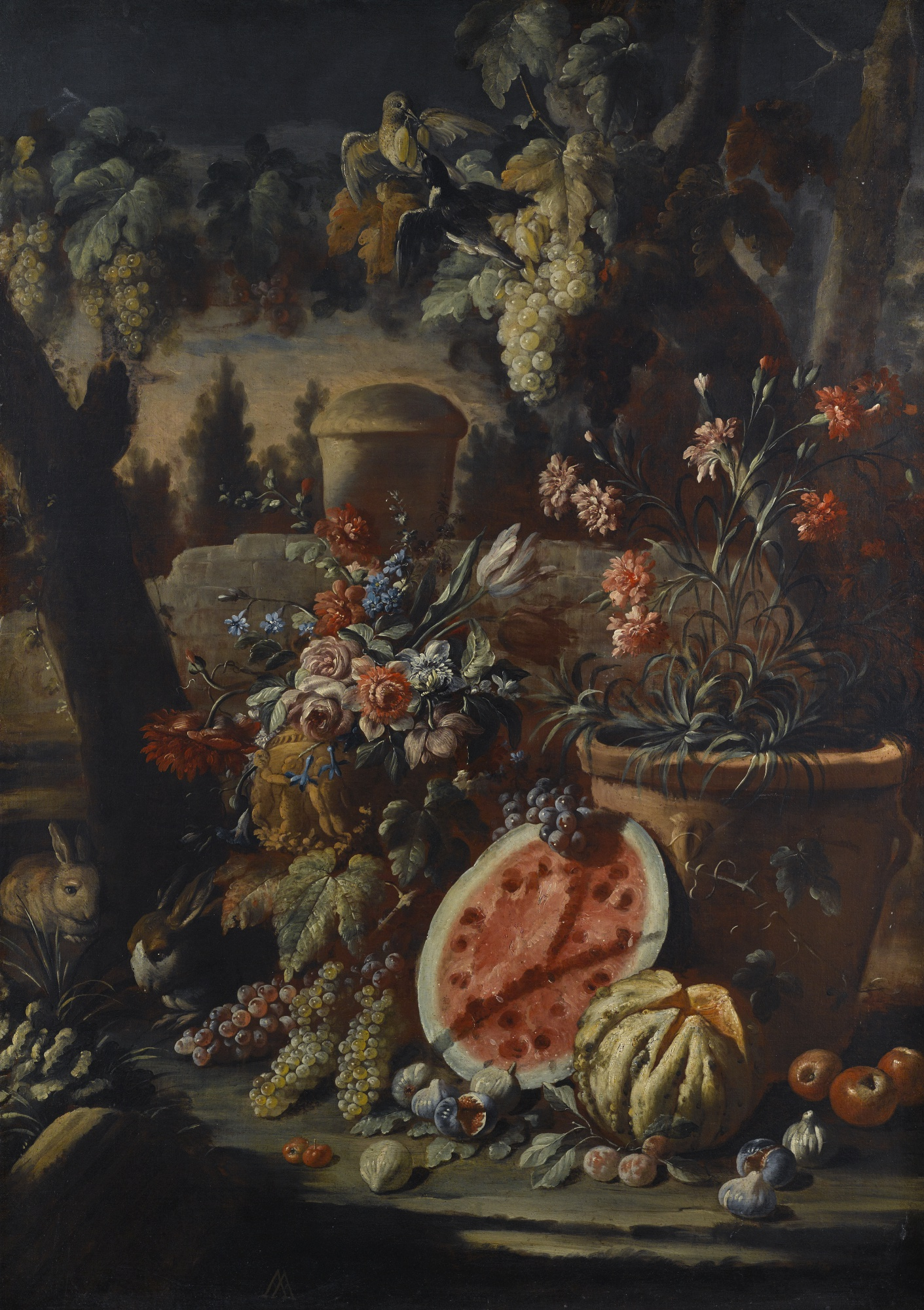
Carnations in a terracotta pot, with grapes, watermelon and other fruit in a landscape

Little is known about the early life of Ascione.

He was a pupil of Neapolitan still life painter Giovan Battista Ruoppolo. Ascione was among the protagonists of the Baroque still life in Naples. He imitated the most striking examples of Flemish Baroque still lifes. He was also among the late 17th century Neapolitan painters who were influenced by Luca Giordano. The Italian art historian and painter Bernardo de' Dominici stated that Aniello Ascione was very successful and that his works were in the collections of the lords and private individuals. His works were highly regarded in his time.

He is documented in Naples from 1680 to 1708.

== Work ==
Aniello Ascione was a specialist still life painter. He painted still lifes of fruits and flowers, but mostly fruits, in particular of grapes. He signed his paintings with the monogram AA in ligature. His painted small and large-scale canvases.

He initially painted in the style of his master Ruoppolo, which was characterised by its flashy Baroque effects. In his mature period he was influenced by the work of the Flemish painter Abraham Brueghel. Abraham Brueghel is especially known for his still life paintings of southern fruits and flowers, which were typically assembled in front of a landscape. They are frequently enhanced by a precious vase, an antique monument or fragments of Roman sculpture. Brueghel's style was characterised by its chiaroscuro, muted colors, and strong plastic forms as well as an ability to render textures realistically and create illusionistic effects confidently.

Ascione's mature works are made up of decorative still lifes of fruits and flowers placed in a landscape in semi-darkness. Some of his works reach a very high level, through their warm chromatic intonation and successful decorative effect. The identification of his oeuvre is based on the two large canvases kept at the Castello Ursino in Catania, the Still life with fruit, flowers, sculpted vase, fountain and architecture in the Museo di Capodimonte, Naples and a series of the Four Seasons in the Museum Correale in Sorrento. A rarity in his oeuvre is the Kitchen with a skinned lamb in the Castellino collection in Naples. It demonstrates that the theme of the kitchen scene also appealed to him.

He was also able to integrate still lifes with figures in compositions created in collaboration with specialist figure painters. An example is the Flower cartouche with the Adoration of the Magi made in collaboration with Nicola Vaccaro who painted the cartouche.

== Gallery ==
Works of Aniello Ascione

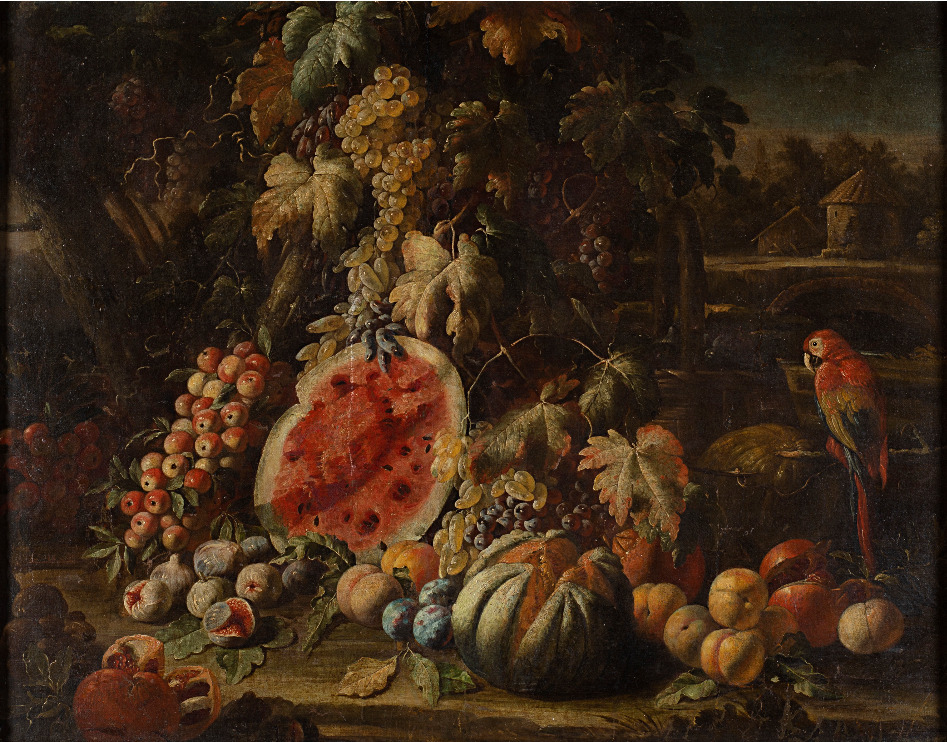
Still life with Apples, Watermelon, Grapes, Figs, Peaches, Plums, Melon, Pomegranates and Parrot

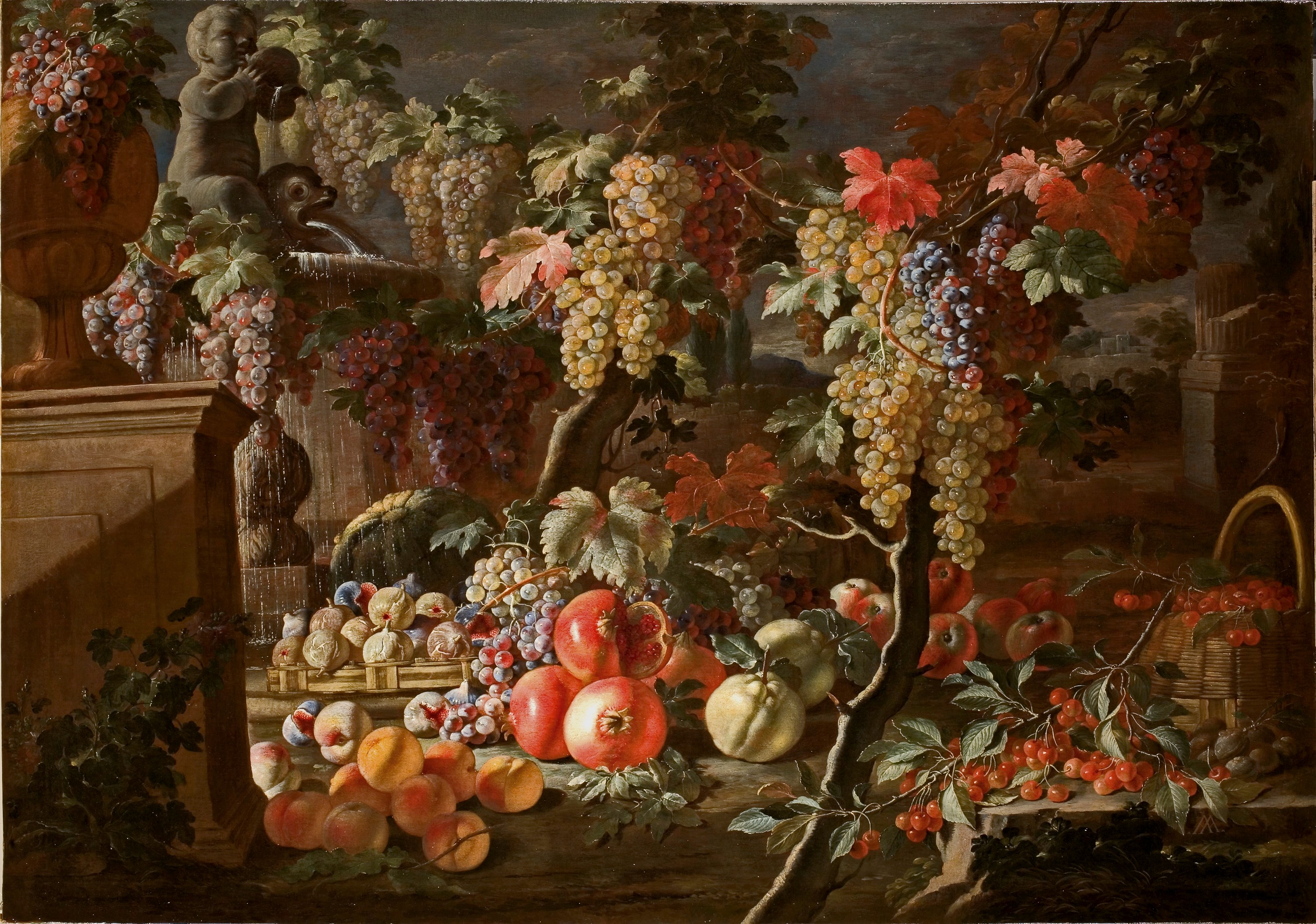
Still life of fruit on an entablature in a landscape

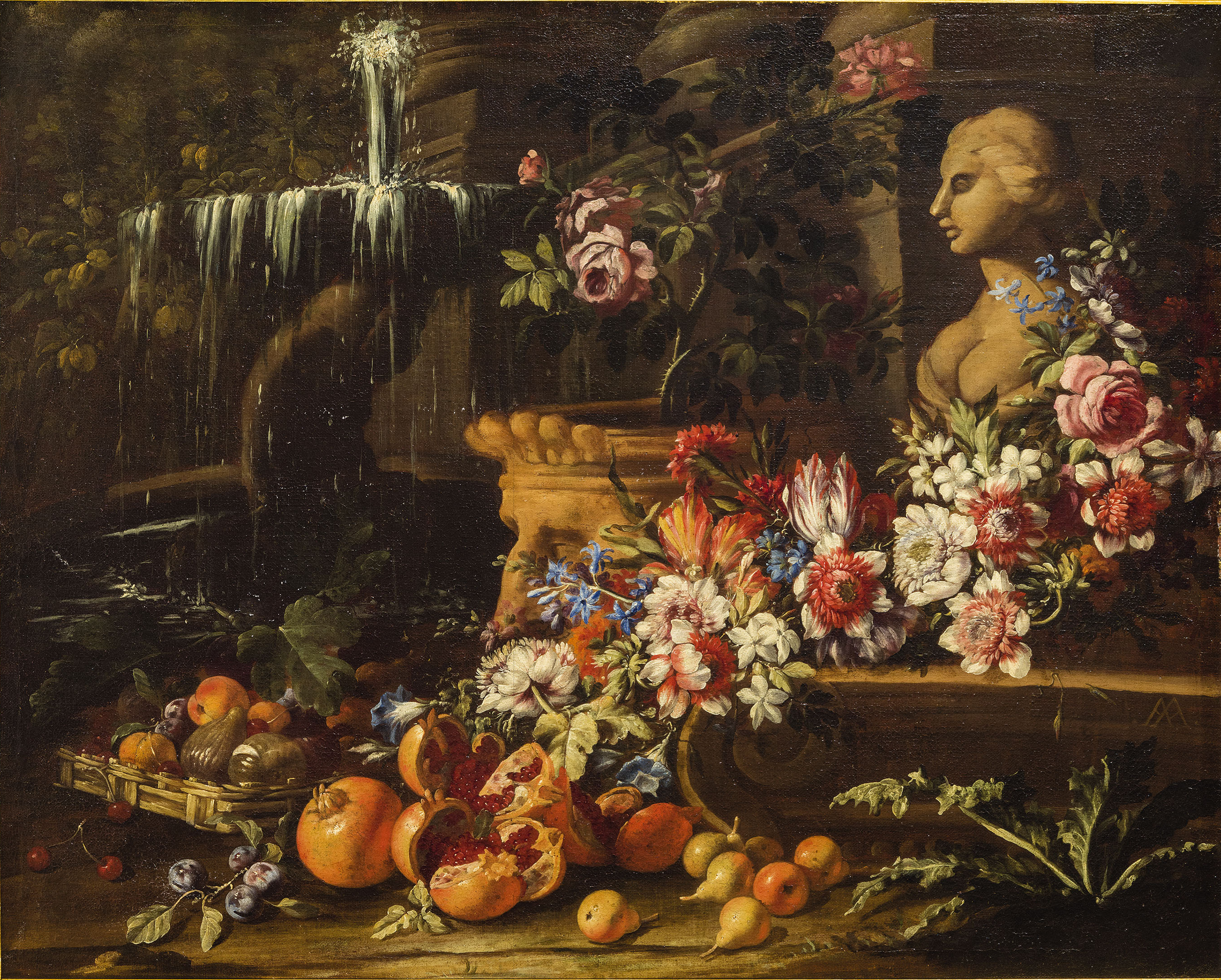
Still life with flowers, fruits and a fountain
