= Giacomo Farelli =

Italian painter

Giacomo Farelli (1629 in Naples – 26 June 1706) was an Italian painter active in Naples.

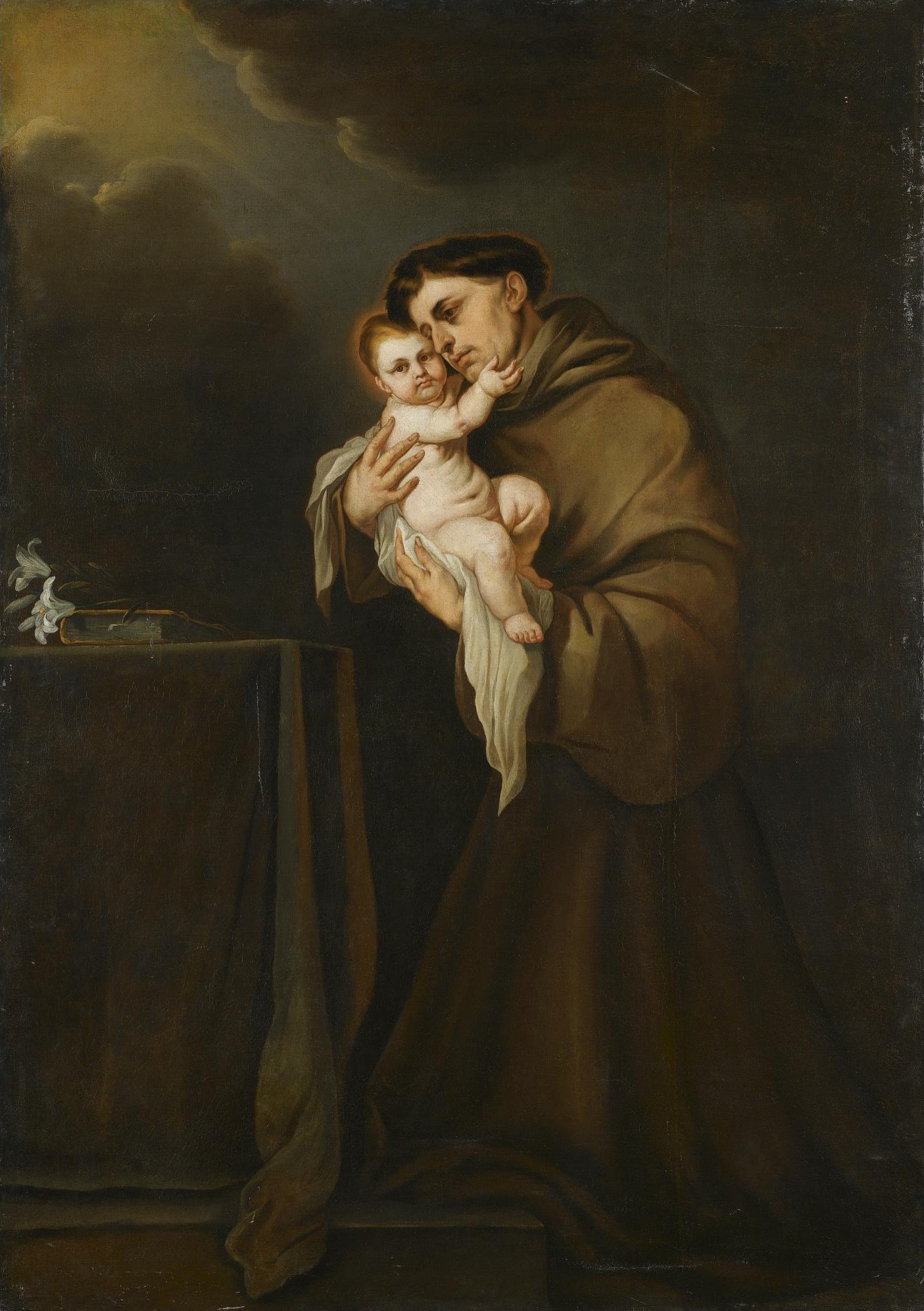
St Antony of Padua

== Biography ==
He trained under Andrea Vaccaro, whose style he at first followed, but he afterwards imitated with more success that of Guido Reni and Luca Giordano.

He painted a The Fall of the Angels, and The Ascension for the church of Santa Maria Maggiore of Naples. He also painted for the church of Santi Apostoli and the church of the Redenzione dei Cattivi.

He also painted for Pietà dei Turchini, Gesù Nuovo, Santi Apostoli and for the Congregation of Sette Dolori in Naples. He returned to Abruzzo, and painted a large fresco in the Palazzo Ducale of Jove fights the Giants and Life of Hercules. He also painted medallions with portraits of the Ducal family for the Acquaviva family. He also painted for Giovanni Girolamo II in the palazzo ducale of Atri. Domenici describes these frescoes on the Life of Hercules as poetic conceits, with a brave ideation that leads to great works.
