= Santa Maria del Rosario a Portamedina =

Church building in Naples, Italy

Coordinates: 40.846221°N 14.245857°E

Santa Maria del Rosario a Portamedina (also known as the church of Santa Giovanna d'Arco or Rosariello a Portamedina) is a church located on Via Rosario in Portamedina in the Quartieri Spagnoli of the historic center of Naples, Italy.

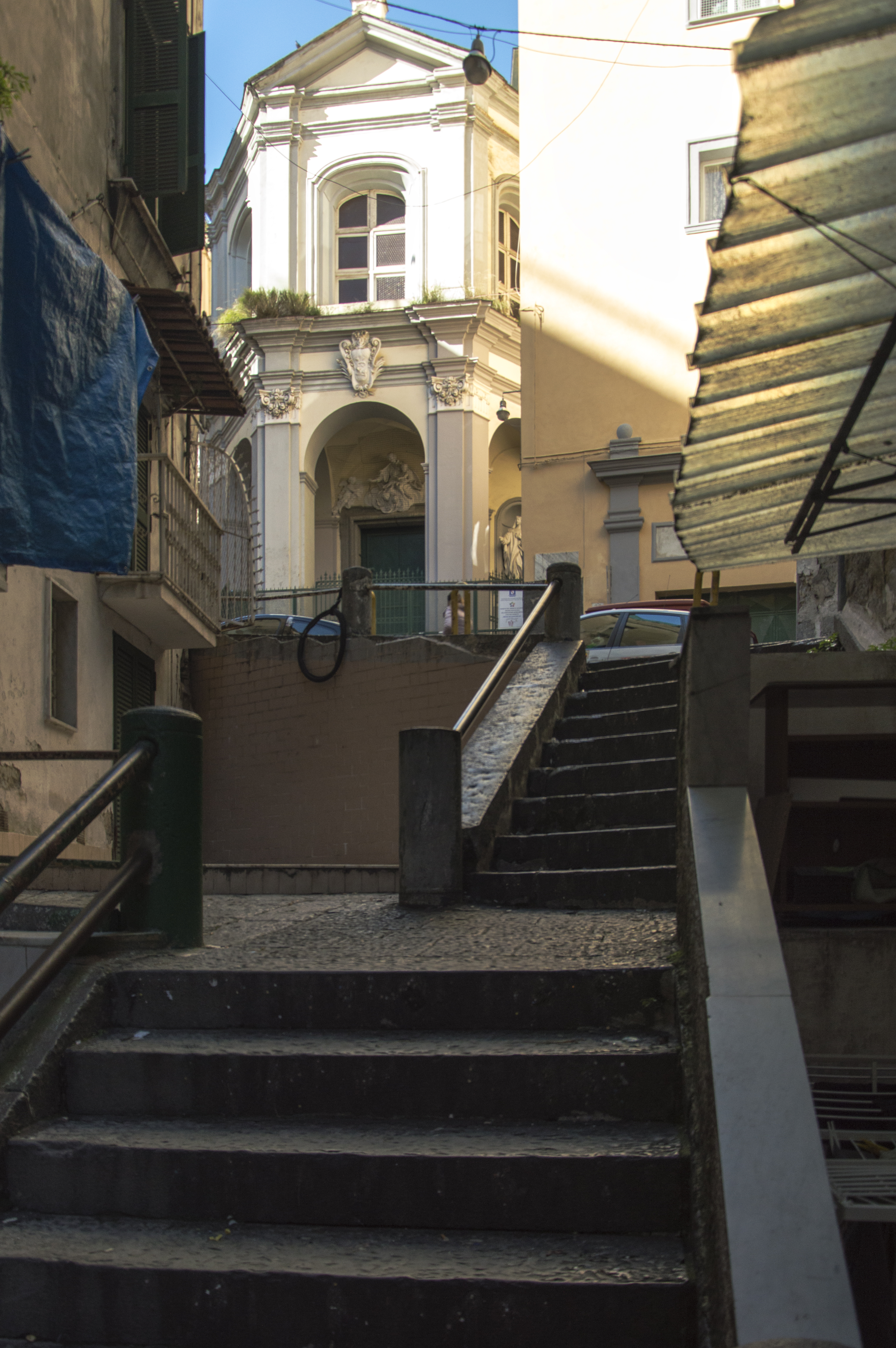
Facade

The church was founded in 1568 by the Congregation of the Holy Spirit, and church and cloister were completed in the 17th century. From 1724 to 1742, the complex underwent reconstruction, which gives the site its present shape, external rococo decoration, and internal stucco details. This was likely carried out by either Domenico Antonio Vaccaro or his followers. In 1929, the conservatory of the Dominican order was transferred to nuns of the Compagnia di Maria and in 1937 it was recognized legally as a school. During the twentieth century, the complex was enlarged and altered.

The facade facing a narrow street, has an ornate stucco portico. The interior is a centralized with two chapels, a rectangular apse, and no dome. At present, the church is closed to the public.

== Bibliography ==
- AA.VV. Napoli: Montecalvario questione aperta, Clean edizioni, Naples, Italy
