= Santissima Trinità degli Spagnoli =

Church building in Naples, Italy

Church of Santissima Trinità degli Spagnoli
- Chiesa della Santissima Trinità degli Spagnoli
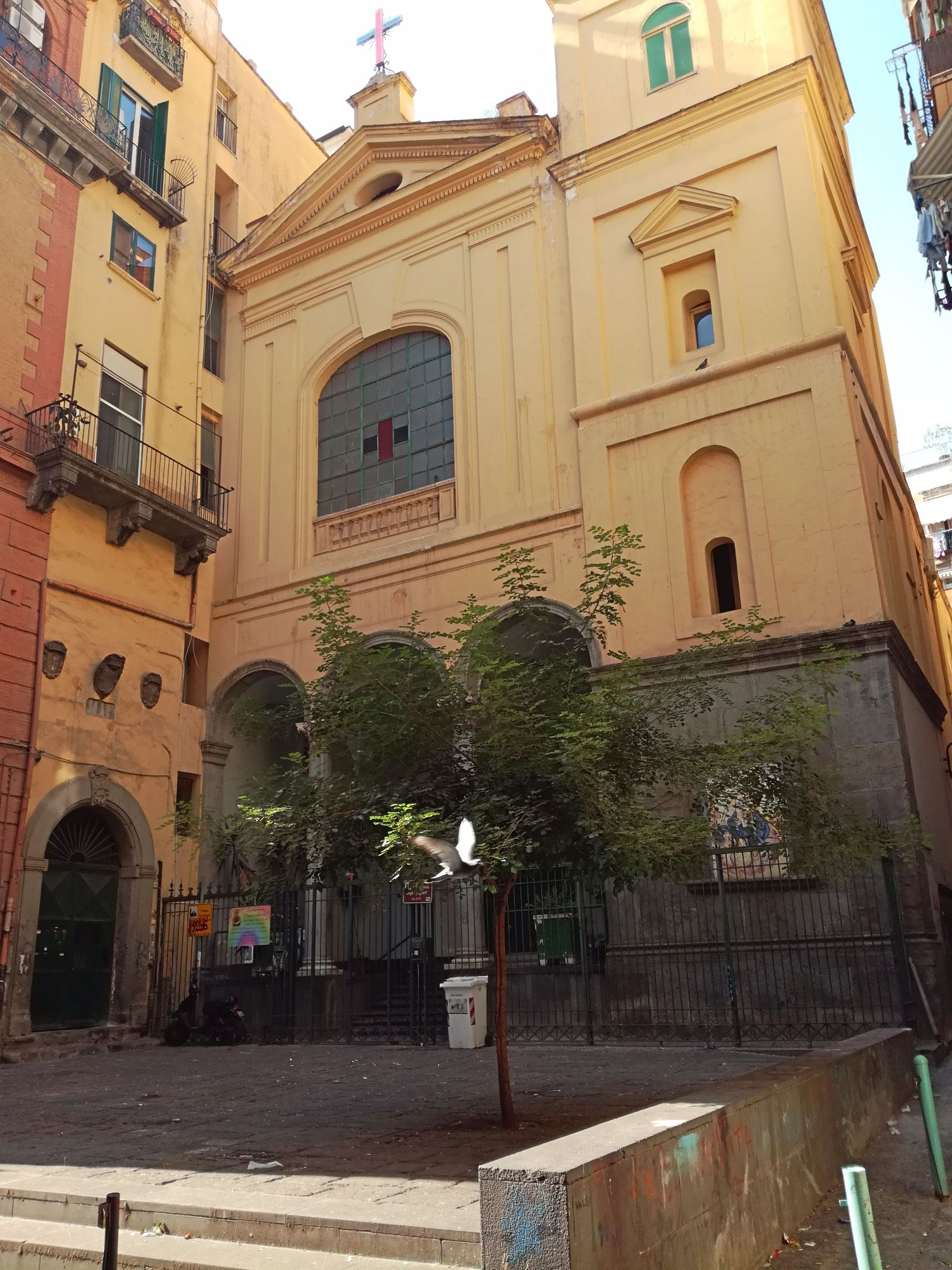
- Lower façade of church.
- Church of Santissima Trinità degli Spagnoli
- 40.839988°N 14.246474°E
- Location: Via dei Tribunali; Naples; Province of Naples, Campania
- Country: Italy
- Denomination: Roman Catholic

History
- Status: Active

Architecture
- Architectural type: Baroque architecture
- Groundbreaking: 1573

Administration
- Diocese: Roman Catholic Archdiocese of Naples

The church of the Santissima Trinità degli Spagnoli is a religious building in Naples, Italy, located in the piazza of the same name.

The structure was first built in 1573 and was ceded to the Spanish residents of the Quartieri Spagnoli. Later it passed to the Order of the Santissima Trinità della Redenzione dei Cattivi, an order dedicated to the redemption of captives held in Muslim lands. This order had been instituted by Pope Innocent III. The church was rebuilt and the interior redecorated by the Trinitarians in 1788. The portico dates from the mid-17th century.

The church and convent were suppressed during the Napoleonic occupation. At the time a 17-century altarpiece of the Santissima Trinità con la Madonna del Rimedio was looted.

== Bibliography ==
- Napoli e dintorni, Touring club Italia, Touring Editor, 2001.
