= Santa Maria della Concordia =

Church building in Naples, Italy

Coordinates: 40.839540°N 14.244753°E

Santa Maria della Concordia is a baroque-style, Roman Catholic church, located on the Piazza of the same name in Naples, region of Campania, Italy.

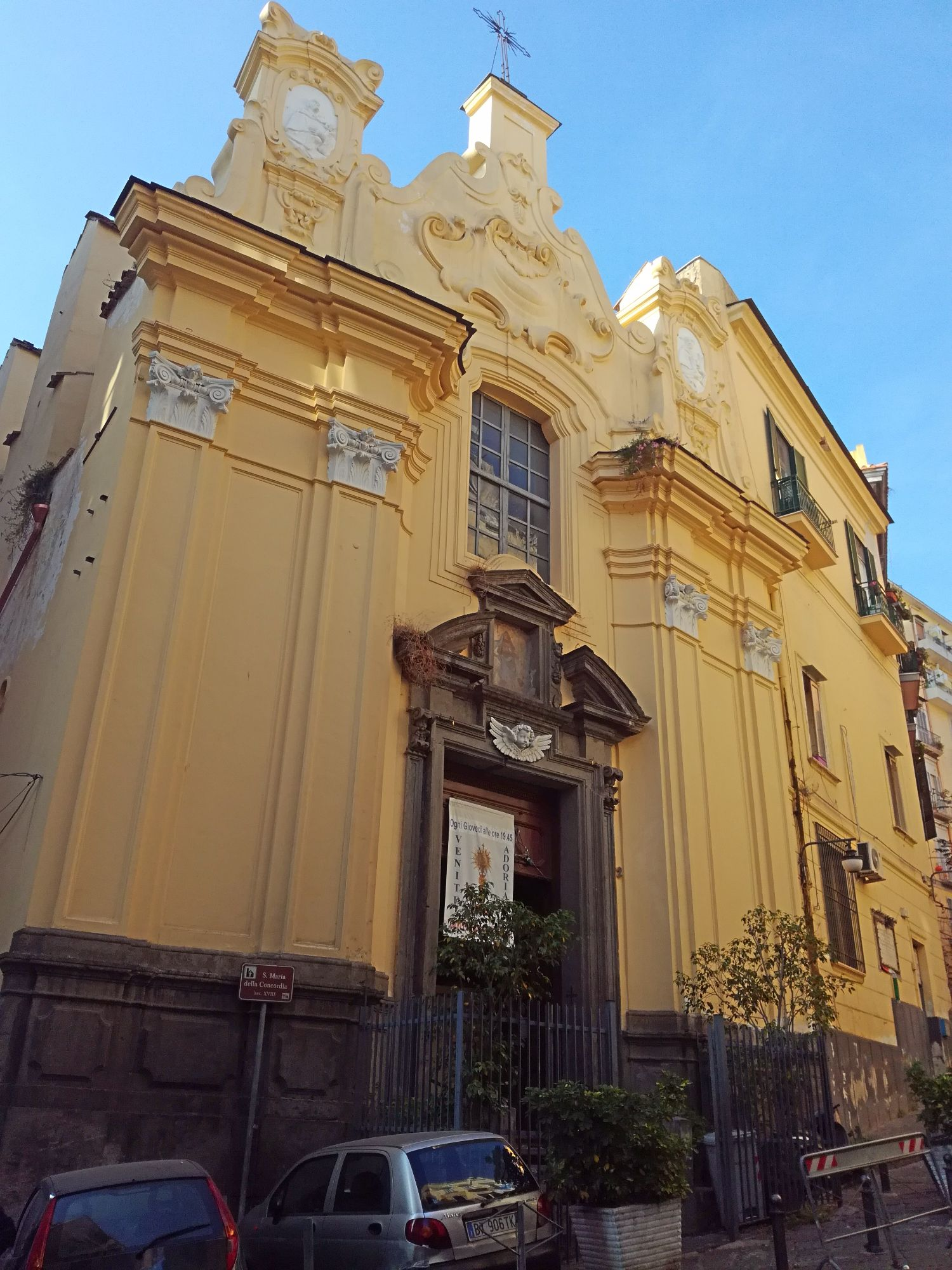
Façade

== History ==
The church was erected in 1556 using designs by the Carmelite priest Giuseppe Romano. It was restored in the 18th century by the architect Giovan Battista Nauclerio. In 1735, Nicola Tagliacozzi Canale was involved in the refurbishment of the interiors.

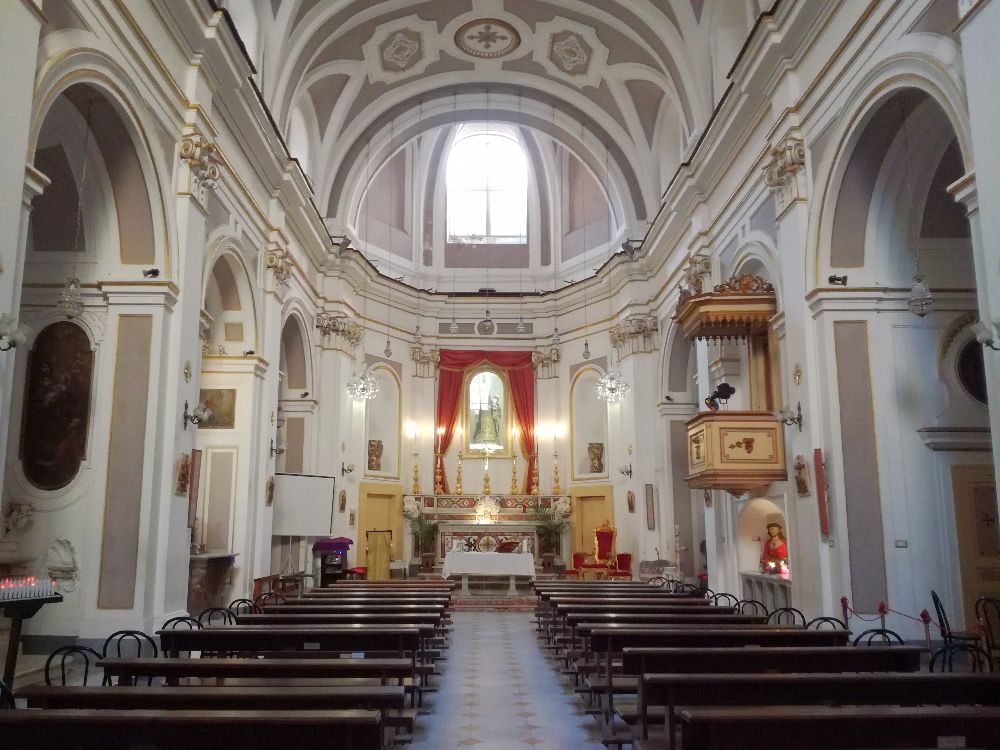
Interior of church

The 18th-century facade is elaborate, built on a high plinth of piperno dominated by two pairs of pilasters of composite order. Near the door of the sacristy, is a painting depicting a Virgin and St Michael, attributed to Jusepe de Ribera, though some attribute it to Bernardo Azzolino. To the left of the entrance is a tomb of Gaspare Benemerino, who died in 1641, and claimed to be son of the King of Fez. As mentioned in the inscription, he converted, and joining the armies of Philip III of Spain, he fought against his former countrymen.

The complex over the centuries hosted a boarding school and a conservatory, but the French suppressed the convent and in the 19th century it was converted into a famous prison for debtors, often those from the upper classes.

== Bibliography ==
- Vincenzo Regina, Le chiese di Napoli. Viaggio indimenticabile attraverso la storia artistica, architettonica, letteraria, civile e spirituale della Napoli sacra, Newton and Compton editor, Naples 2004.
