= Giuseppe Fattoruso =

Italian painter

Giuseppe Fattoruso (17th century) was an Italian painter of the Baroque period, active in his natal city of Naples. He was a pupil of Andrea Vaccaro.
