= Santa Maria Maggiore della Pietrasanta =

Church of Santa Maria Maggiore della Pietrasanta
- Chiesa di Santa Maria Maggiore della Pietrasanta
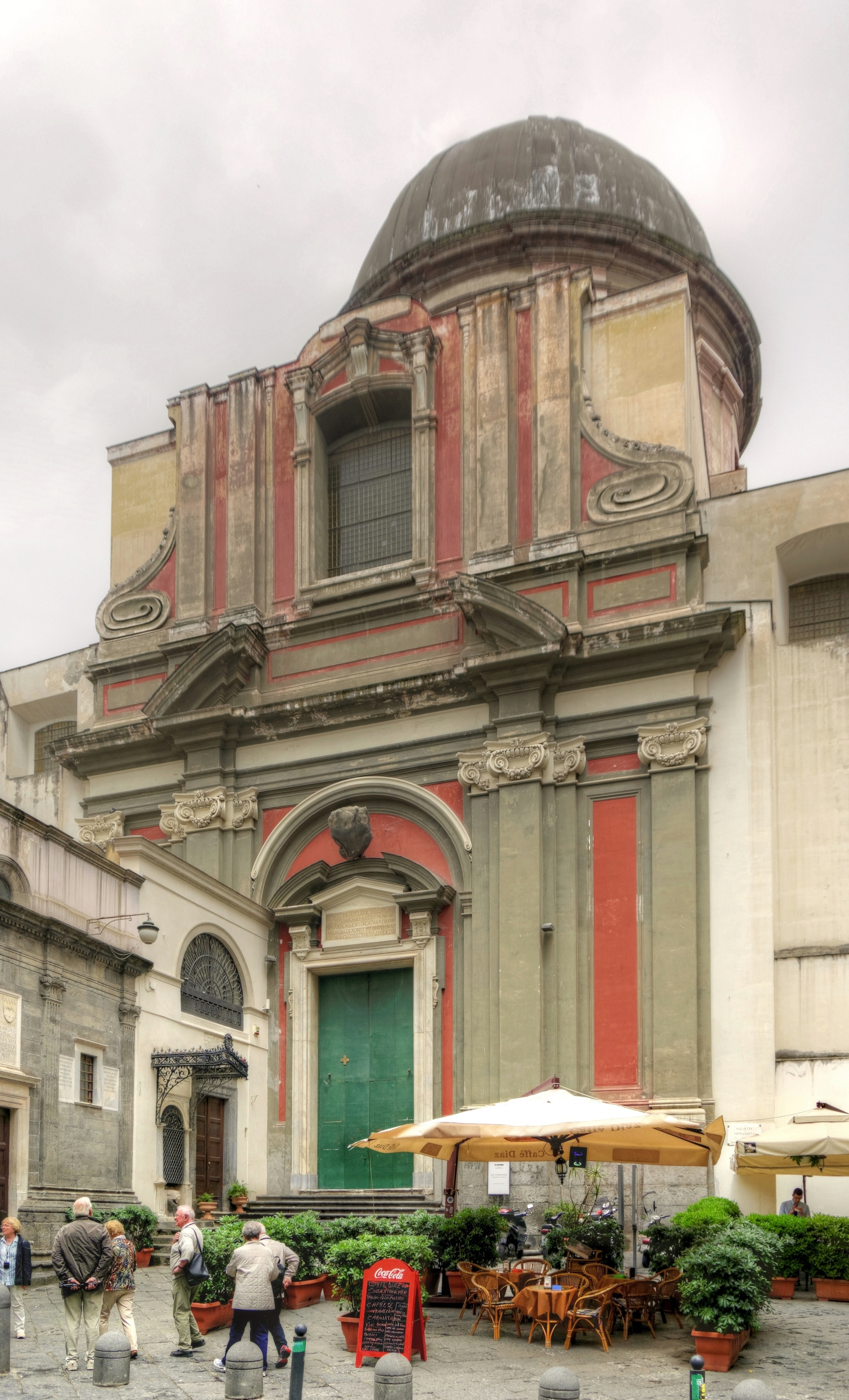
- The façade of Santa Maria Maggiore della Pietrasanta in Naples .
- Church of Santa Maria Maggiore della Pietrasanta
- 40.8504°N 14.2544°E
- Location: Naples; Province of Naples, Campania
- Country: Italy
- Denomination: Roman Catholic

History
- Status: Active

Architecture
- Architectural type: Baroque architecture
- Groundbreaking: 1653
- Completed: 1678

Administration
- Diocese: Roman Catholic Archdiocese of Naples

The church of Santa Maria Maggiore della Pietrasanta is a Roman Catholic religious edifice located on Via Tribunali in central Naples, Italy.

== History ==
Tradition holds the church was erected in 533 atop the ruins of a Temple of Diana; construction was instigated by the Bishop Pomponio of Naples, a relative of Pope John II. A church at the site, dedicated to Santa Maria Maggiore, was consecrated in 535. It was soon titled a minor basilica church.

By 1654, the old church was threatening collapse, and reconstruction was pursued under the designs of Cosimo Fanzago, which led to the domed church with a Greek cross layout we see today. Work was soon interrupted due to lack of funds. There is evidence of a paleochristian basilica in the crypt, and the finding of an old stone carved with a cross gave the church part of its name. The bell tower was constructed in the 11th century.

To the left of the entrance and obscuring the left lower facade, is in part, the Renaissance chapel: Capella Pontano, erected in 1492 by Giovanni Pontano, the Secretary to Ferdinand I of Aragon. To the right of the church and some meters distant is the medieval bell tower.

An inventory of the church in 1845 said the first chapel on the right had a dilapidated canvas depicting the Virgin and Sts Peter and Paul by Marco di Pino and a main altarpiece depicting a Virgin of the Annunciation by Giuseppe Bonito. The next chapel also had a canvas depicting a Guardian Angel by Bonito as well as a canvas by Vaccaro depicting a Madonna della Grazie, Bishop Pomponio, and St Anthony. Near the main altar, a chapel had a Archangel Raphael and Tobias by Bonito. The main chapel had altarpieces by Bonito (Choir of Angels) and by followers of Luca Giordano (St Michael Archangel). The last chapel on left had a Holy Family by Farelli. Adjacent to the church, the chapel of the Holy Sacrament had an altarpiece by Aniella di Rosa.

== Gallery ==
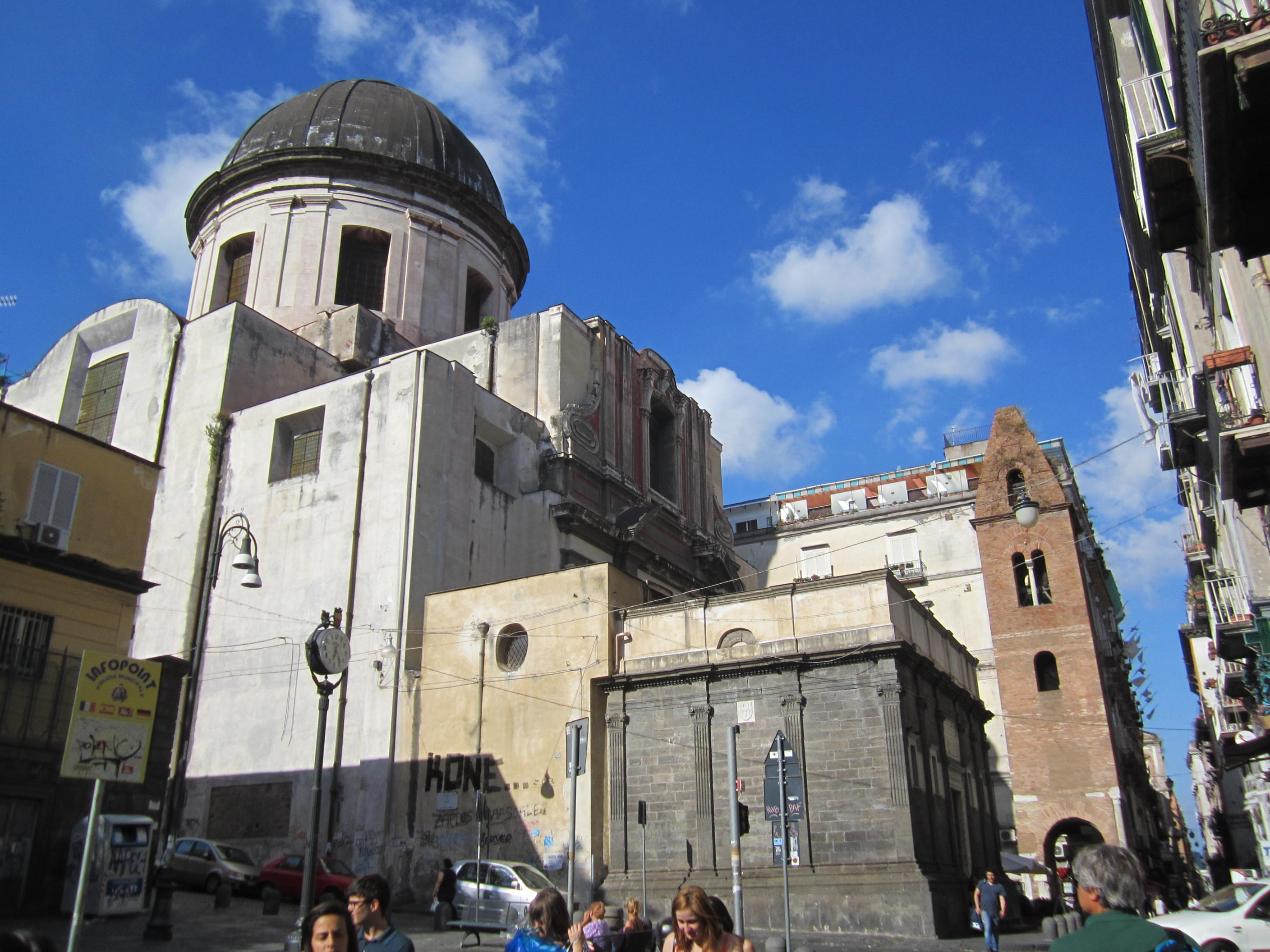
View from left flank, showing dome, Capella Pontano left of the facade, and the brick bell tower to right of façade

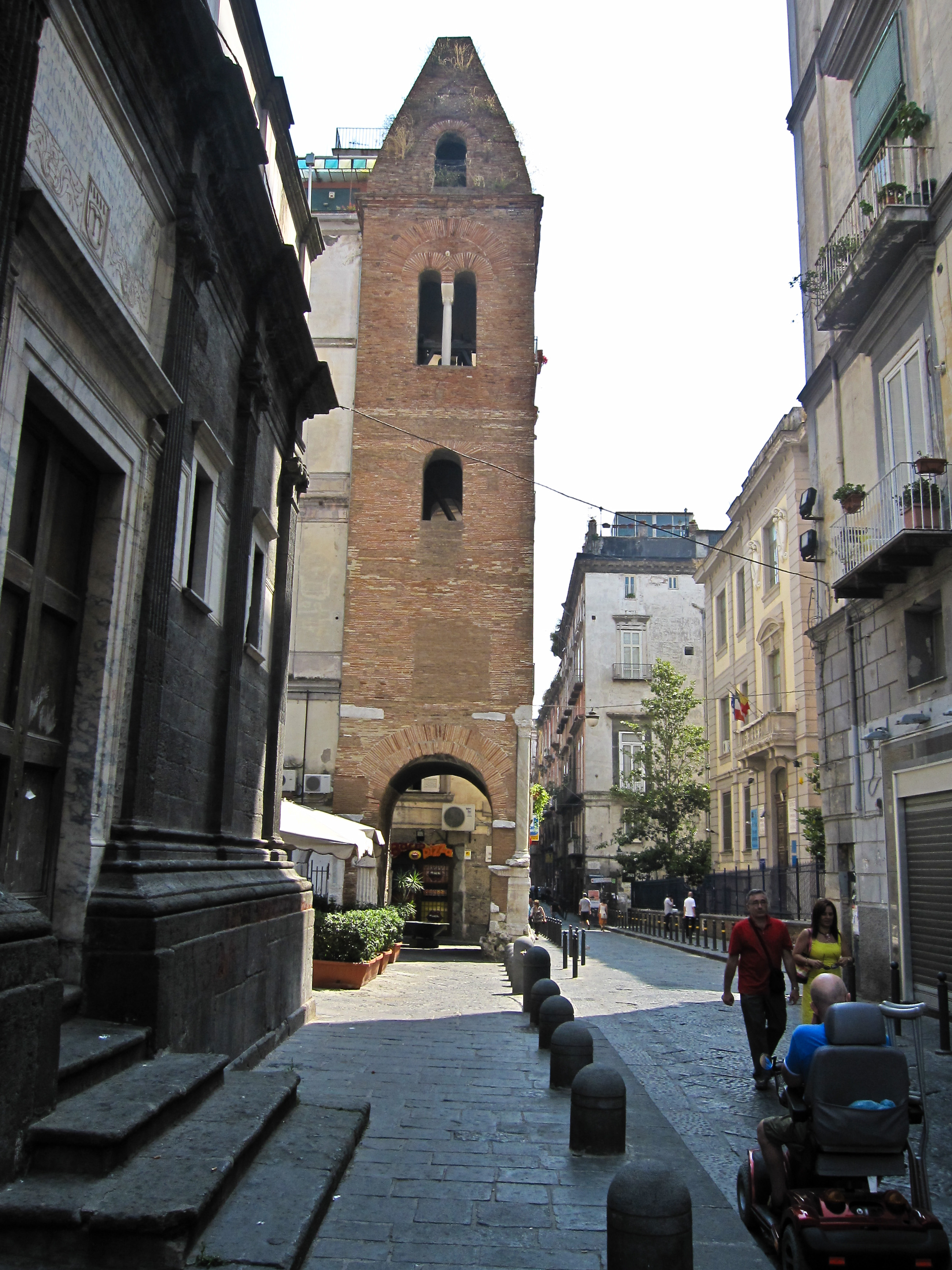
The bell tower

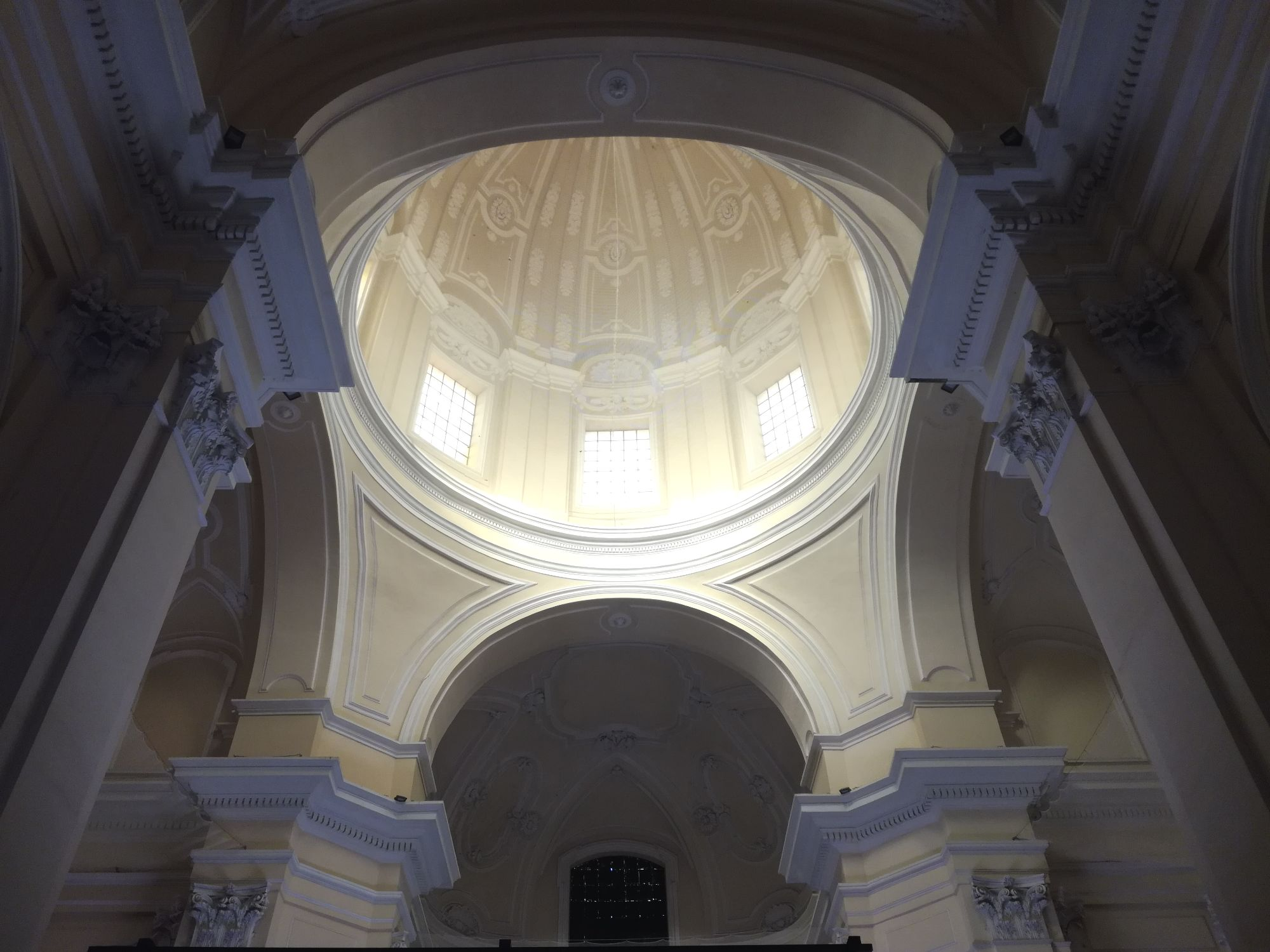
Interior of the dome

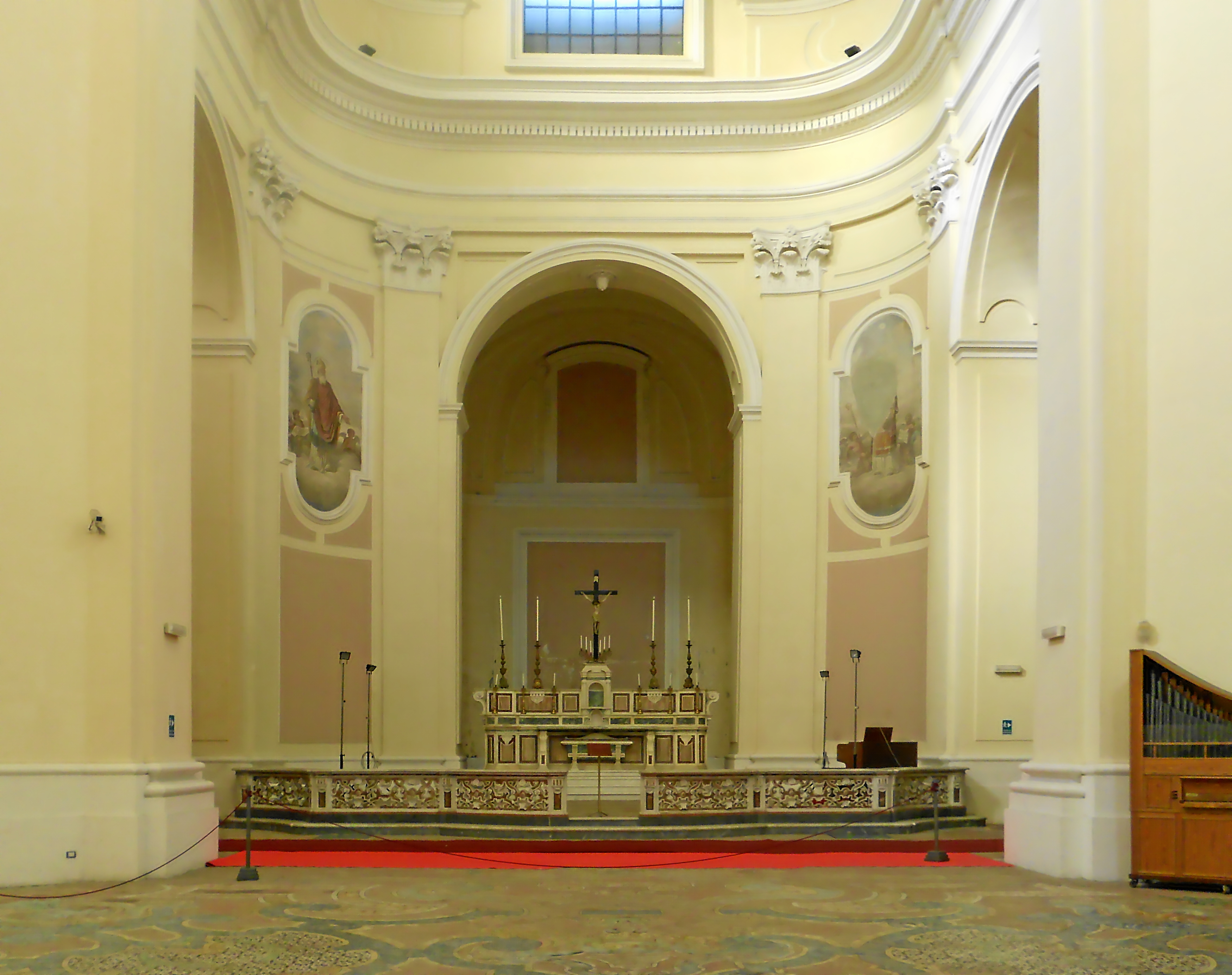
Main altar

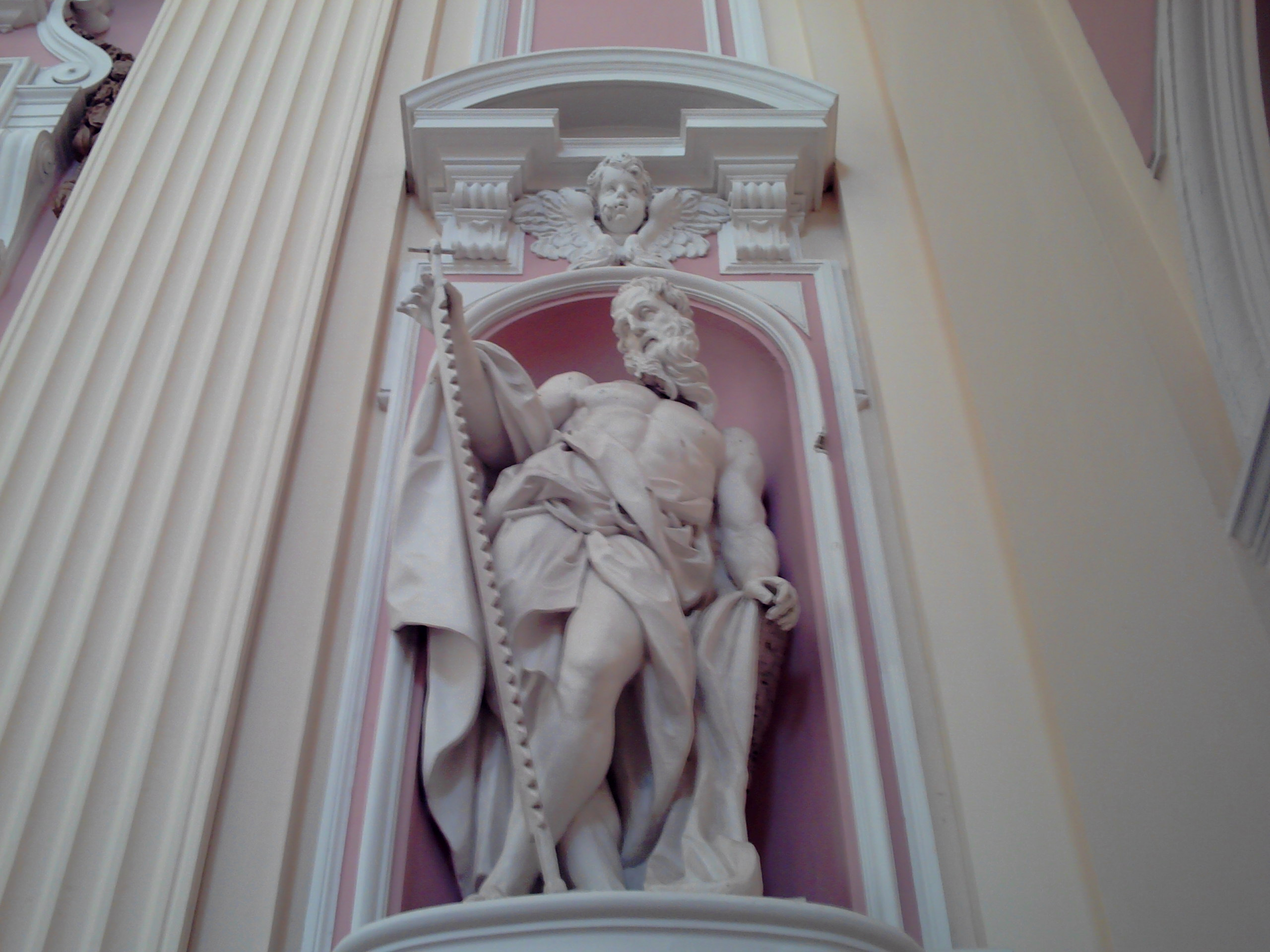
Sculptures
