= Andrea Vaccaro =

Italian painter

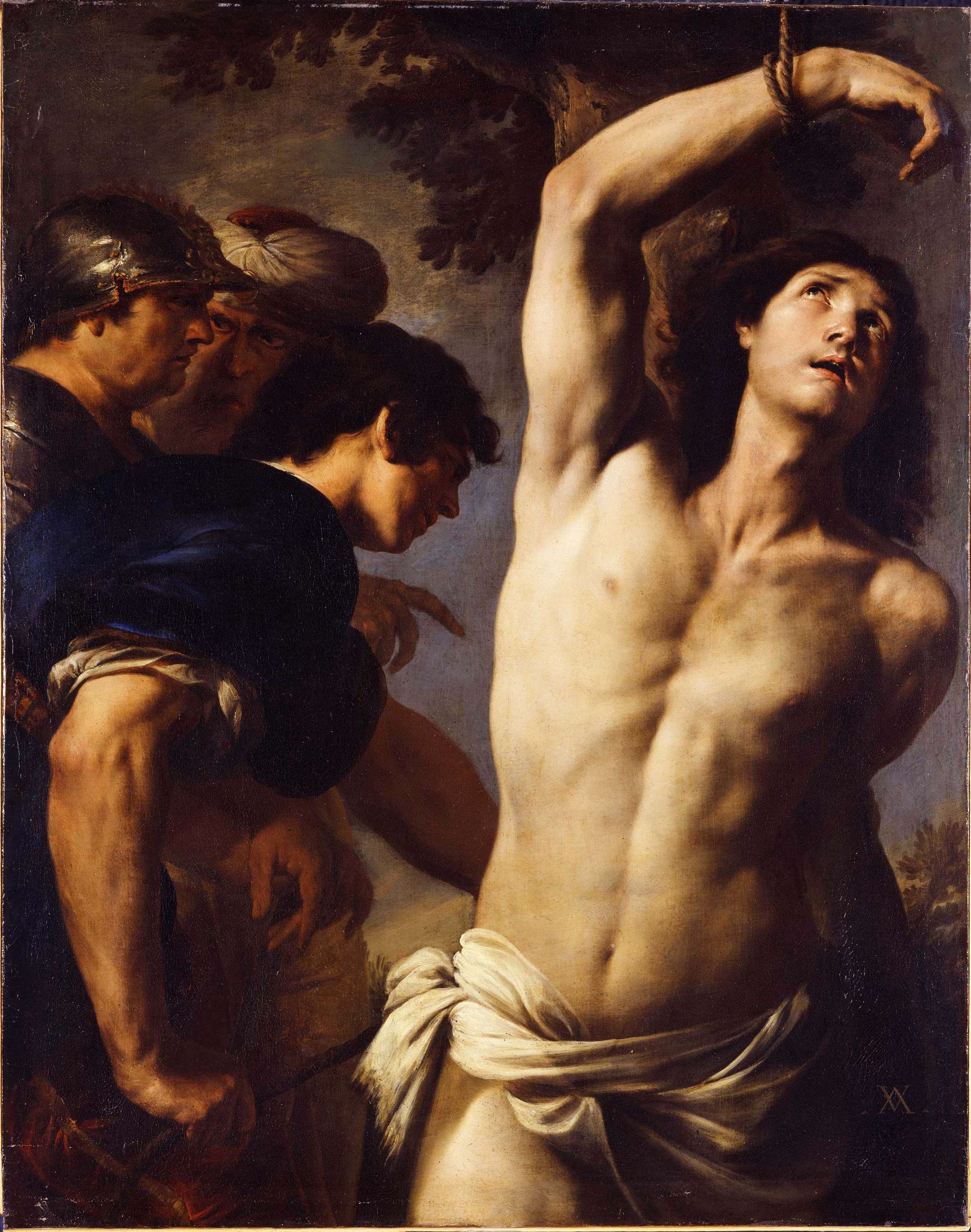
Martyrdom of St Sebastian (circa 1640)

Andrea Vaccaro (baptised on 8 May 1604 – 18 January 1670) was an Italian painter of the Baroque period. Vaccaro was in his time one of the most successful painters in Naples, a city then under Spanish rule. Very successful and valued in his lifetime, Vaccaro and his workshop produced many religious works for local patrons as well as for export to Spanish religious orders and noble patrons. He was initially influenced by Caravaggio, in particular in his chiaroscuro and the naturalistic rendering of his figures.

== Life ==
Very little is known for certain about Andrea Vaccaro's early life. Andrea Vaccaro was born in Naples as the son of Pietro Baccaro and Gioanna di Glauso. His father practiced a legal profession. Vaccaro first applied himself to the study of literature, then he turned to art. Where it was earlier believed that he apprenticed with the late-Mannerist painter Girolamo Imparato, it is now known that Imparato died in 1607 and could thus not have been his teacher. Andrea Vaccaro was at the age of 16 apprenticed to Giovanni Tommaso Passaro, a minor artist. No works from this early phase of his career have been preserved.

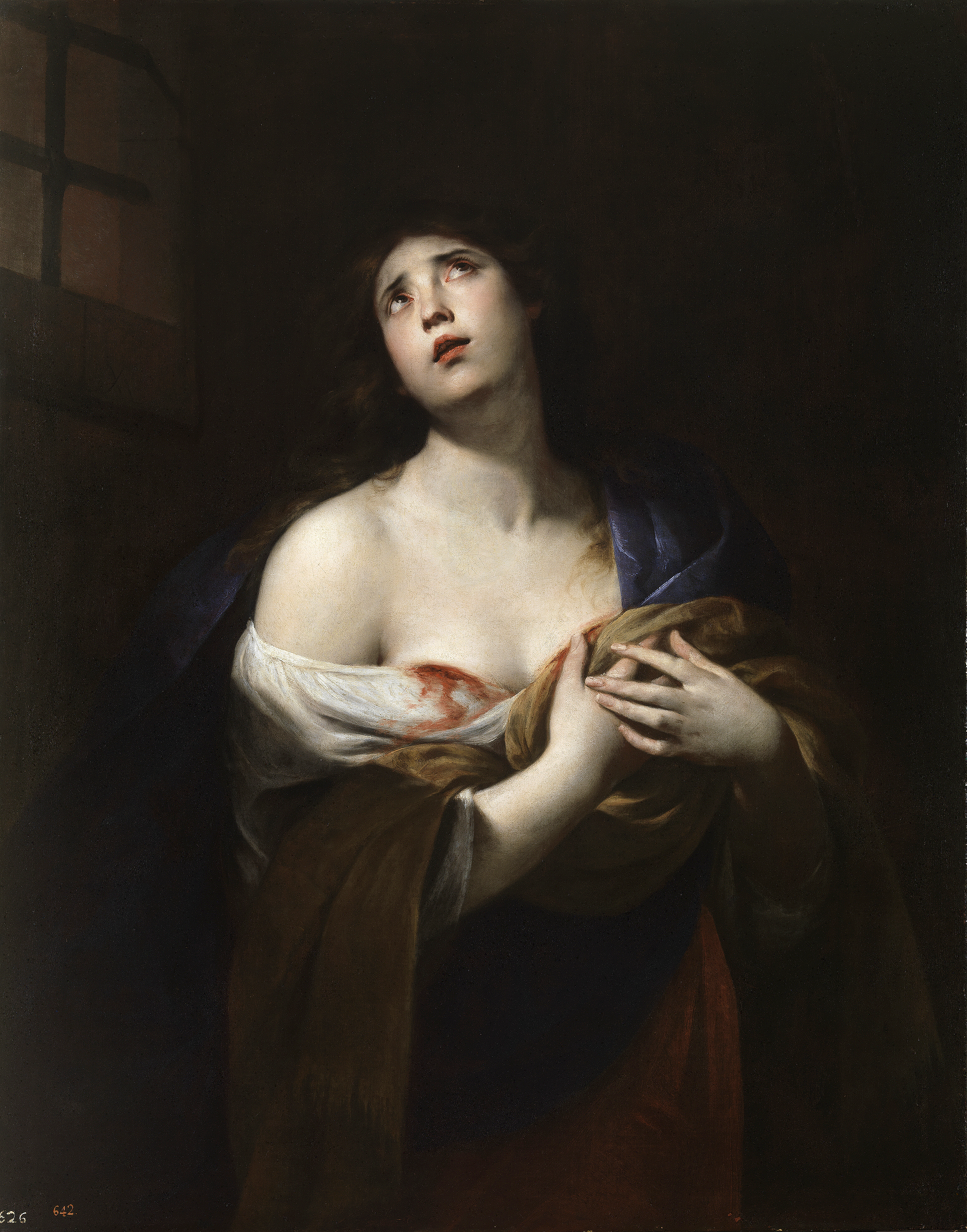
Saint Agatha (circa 1635)

On 16 February 1628, Angela Geronima, a child of the young artist and his first wife was baptized. This suggests that he had already established a family by this time. No further information about this first marriage is available.

His paintings from shortly after 1620 show the influence of Caravaggio and his Neapolitan followers. He reportedly painted a copy of Caravaggio's Flagellation (Galleria Nazionale di Capodimonte). At one time, both the copy and original hung together in San Domenico Maggiore. Not all scholars accept that the copy was in fact painted by Vacarro. After 1630 Vaccaro came into contact with the work of Guido Reni, Anthony van Dyck, and Pietro Novelli. He produced copies of the work of these artists for Neapolitan collectors and Flemish art dealers in Naples such as Gaspar Roomer and Jan Vandeneyden. It is believed he was also active as an art dealer, as was common among Neapolitan painters of the time.

Vaccaro contracted his second marriage to the 24-year old Anna Criscuolo on 17 April 1639. A year later, on 13 March 1640, their son Tomaso Domenico Nicola was born. He would later be known as the painter Nicola Vaccaro.

Vaccaro became very successful and almost every collection in Naples boasted at least one painting by him. Vaccaro also had patrons in other parts of Italy. From 1635 he started exporting religious canvases to Spain for religious orders and noble patrons. He was further patronized by the Spanish Viceroy of Naples, Gaspar de Bracamonte. The Viceroy gave the commission for the painting for the high altar of the Santa Maria del Pianto, Naples to Vaccaro. In 1656 the plague devastated Naples decimating half of the population, including the artists Bernardo Cavallino and Massimo Stanzione with whom Andrea Vaccaro had been closely linked. Vacarro continued to receive many commissions, including one for frescos in the Theatine church of San Paolo Maggiore in Naples, the sole fresco commission in his career.

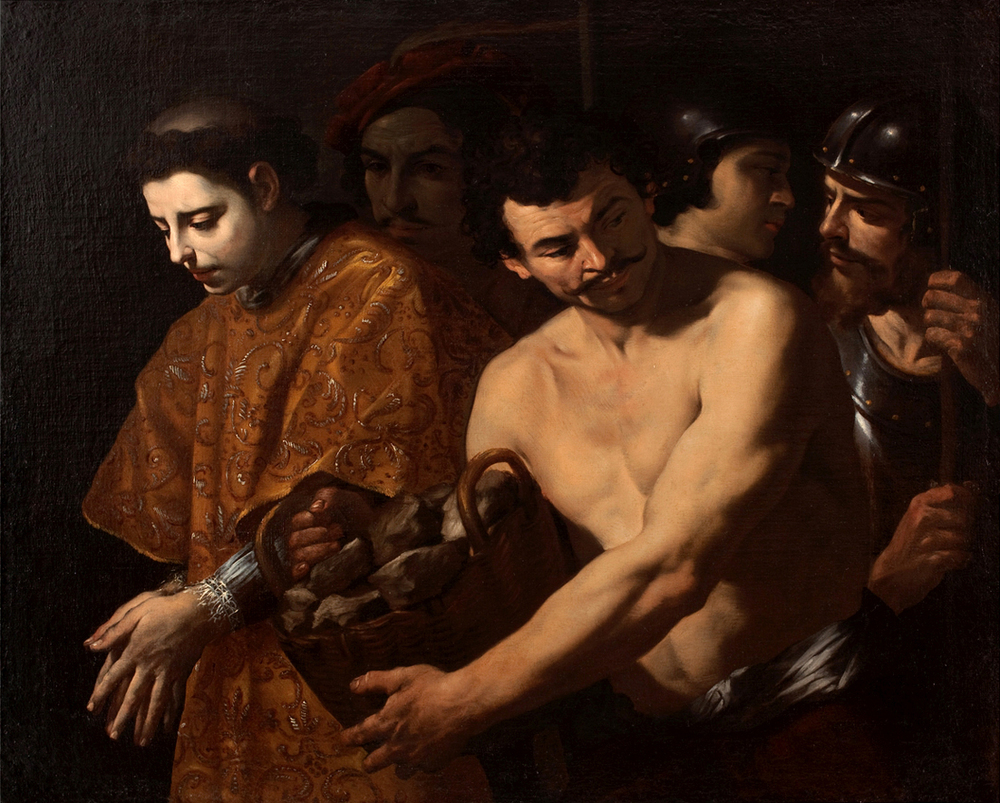
Saint Stephen taken to his Martyrdom

In 1665 Vacarro was one of the founders and head of the 'Congrega dei SS Anna e Luca', a form of painter's guild that likely had as its aim to promote the status of artists in Naples. Between 1650 and 1670, Vaccaro's art was highly influential on Neapolitan painting besides that of Massimo Stanzione, the leading artist at that time, and that of the young Luca Giordano, who was just making his mark.

In the latter part of his life Andrea Vaccaro was also active as an official in the confraternity called the 'Confraternita dei Bianchi of the Conservatorio of the Pietà dei Turchini' from 1657. He was also a Governatore of the 'Conservatorium and Church of Pietà dei Turchini'.

His pupils included Giacomo Farelli and Giuseppe Fattoruso.

== Work ==
Only two paintings by Andrea Vaccaro are known to bear a full signature: Saint Teresa’s Vision of the Golden Collar (Real Academia de Bellas Artes de San Fernando, Madrid) and Saint Luke Portraying the Virgin and Child painted for the Corporation of Neapolitan Painters. These signed paintings also include the year. Only one other painting, the Communion of Saint Mary of Egypt displays the year.

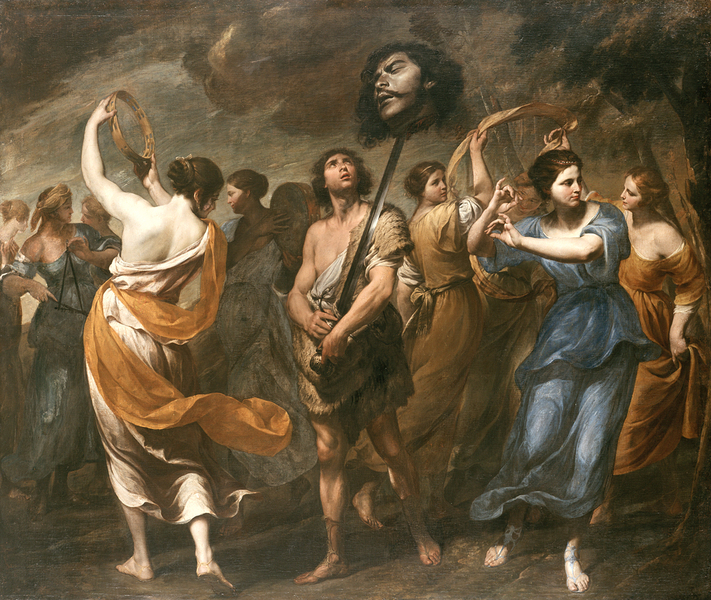
The Triumph of David

Vaccaro's monogram is present on a number of his paintings. It is composed of his initials A and V interlaced, with the left leg of the A over the left part of the V, and vice versa for the right parts. As the bar of the A is omitted, the center of the two letters creates a diamond shape. Sometimes a small triangle (delta) appears on both sides of the monogram, as found in Latin inscriptions for abbreviations and/or word divisions.

It has been difficult to attribute authentic works to Vaccaro as his stylistic development is not very well understood. As he operated a large workshop assisting in his works or creating copies of his work, attributions have been fairly difficult.

Vaccaro was initially influenced by Caravaggio, in particular in his use of chiaroscuro effects and the naturalistic rendering of his figures. From 1630 onwards he also drew inspiration from the works of artists such as Guido Reni, Anthony van Dyck and Pietro Novelli. His tenebrism became more illuminated and less harsh, influenced by the more sedate sources such as Pietro da Cortona. The elegant manner of Bernardo Cavallino, whom Vaccaro met and worked with in the second half of the 1640s, became an additional influence.

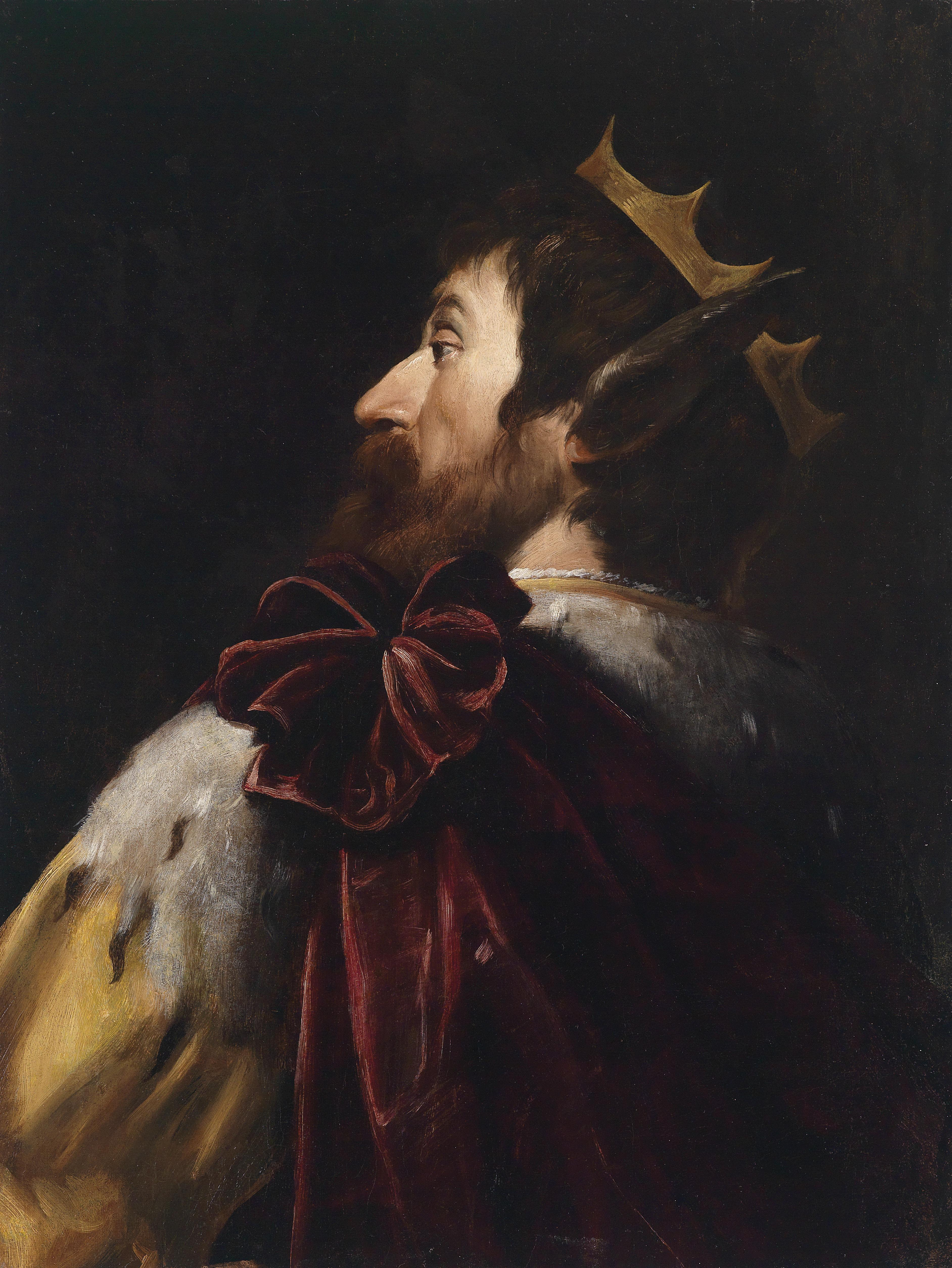
King Midas

Vaccaro endevored to remain neutral with the large contemporary artistic developments. Vaccaro's late work changes from Luca Giordano's palette and Mattia Preti's interplay of light and shadow.

Due to the great success he achieved in life, many of his works were exported to Spain, where a large part of his production is currently located.
