= Andrea Malinconico =

Italian painter

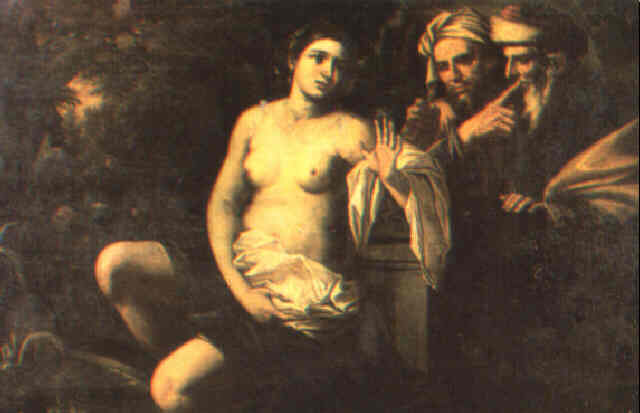
Andrea Malinconico, Susannah and the Elders, c.1650.

Andrea Malinconico (1624 in Naples – 1698) was an Italian painter of the Renaissance period, active near his natal city of Naples. He was a pupil of Massimo Stanzione.
