= Potito =

Potito may refer to:

- Potito (singer), a Spanish flamenco singer
- Potito Starace (born 1981), an Italian professional tennis player
- San Potito Ultra - town and comune in the province of Avellino, Campania, Italy
- San Potito Sannitico, a comune in the Province of Caserta, Campania, Italy
- San Potito (disambiguation)
