= Regina Coeli (disambiguation) =

"Regina Coeli" is a Latin antiphon to the Blessed Virgin Mary.

Regina Coeli may also refer to:

- Church of Regina Coeli (Hyde Park) in New York
- Regina Coeli Convent Church in Mexico City
- Regina Coeli Monastery in Bettendorf, Iowa
- Regina Coeli (prison) in Rome, Italy
- Santa Maria Regina Coeli, a church in Naples, Italy

== See also ==
- Regina caeli
