= Potitus =

Roman saint martyred in 160 AD

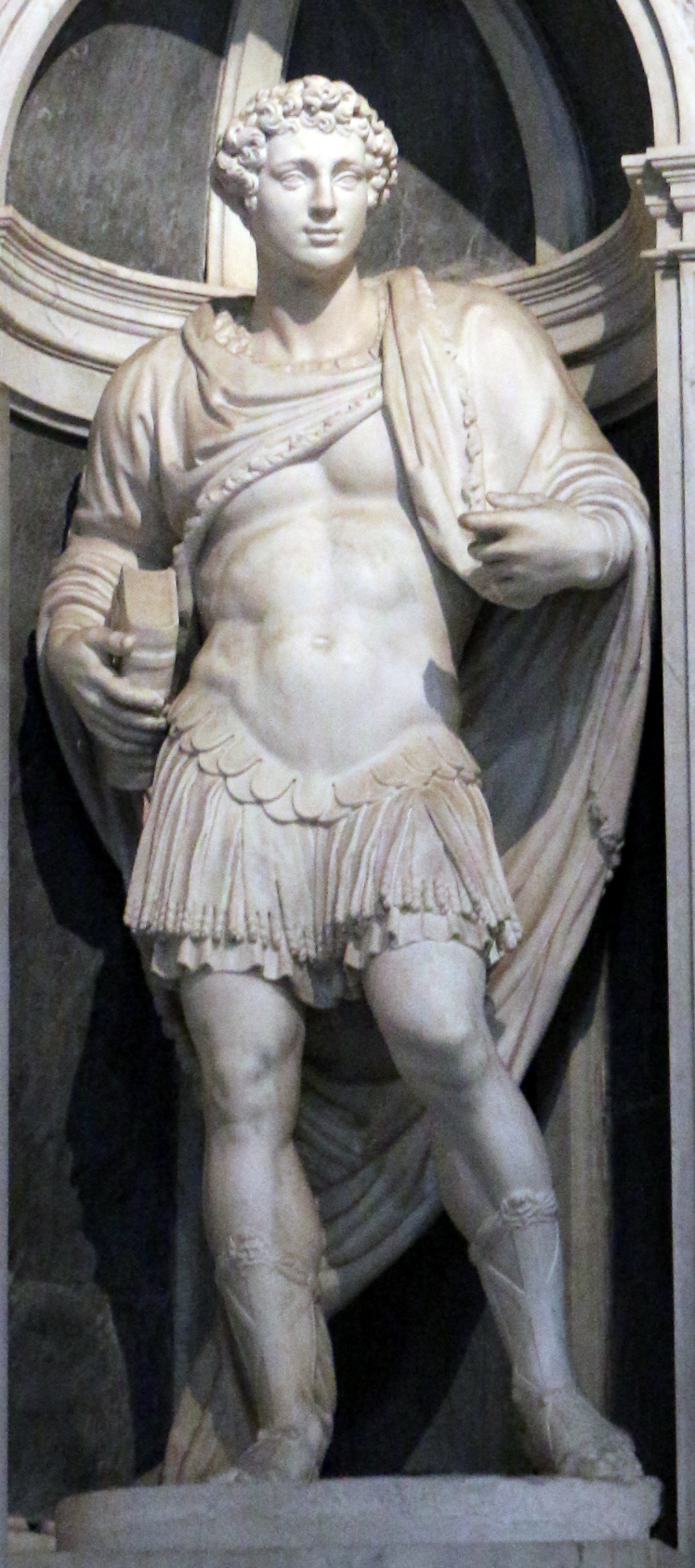
- Statue of Saint Potitus by Paolo Guidotti, San Ranieri altar, Pisa Cathedral.

Martyr
- Born: Sardica
- Died: c. 160 (as a teenager)
- Venerated in: Eastern Orthodox Church; Roman Catholic Church
- Major shrine: Tricarico Cathedral
- Feast: January 14
- Attributes: martyr's palm branch
- Patronage: Ascoli Satriano, San Potito Sannitico, San Potito Ultra, Tricarico, Diocese of Cerignola-Ascoli Satriano, Diocese of Tricarico

Potitus (died around 160) was an early Christian martyr, venerated as a saint by the Roman Catholic Church and the Eastern Orthodox Church on 14 January (or 13 January in the pre-2003 Roman Martyrology).

== Life ==
He was born in Sardica (now Sofia, capital of Bulgaria) in the Roman province of Thracia (established in 107 after the Second Dacian War and later renamed Dacia Inferior). He converted to Christianity and was martyred while still a teenager during the reign of Antoninus Pius. His hagiography states that he came from a very rich pagan family and attributes many miracles to him, especially the curing of the madness of Antoninus Pius' daughter Agnes, which is described in a 9th-century Passio Sancti Potiti. He refused to renounce Christianity and so was thrown to the lions, but they refused to attack and so he was instead thrown into boiling oil, but emerged unharmed. He was therefore pierced with a sword.

== Veneration ==
He is the main patron saint of Tricarico and its diocese and his main relics are sited in its cathedral. His cult spread widely during the Middle Ages, reaching Capua, Naples and Benevento. He is thus also the main patron saint of the town of Ascoli Satriano and its diocese. Ascoli Satriano has a church dedicated to him as well as a bust-reliquary containing part of his ulna in its former cathedral - this reliquary is carried round the town in procession between 18 and 20 August each year and at the end of the festival the ciuccio is burned. Naples also once had a church dedicated to him, San Potito, served by Benedictines, whom pope Clement XII granted a special office in the saint's honour, with hymns edited by the Bollandists.
