= San Potito =

San Potito may refer to:

== People ==
- Saint Potitus, a Bulgarian Catholic saint

== Places (Italy) ==
- San Potito Sannitico, a municipality in the Province of Caserta
- San Potito Ultra, a municipality in the Province of Avellino
- San Potito (Campotosto), a civil parish of Campotosto, in the province of L'Aquila
- San Potito (Lugo), a civil parish of Lugo, in the province of Ravenna
