= Santa Maria di Montesanto =

Santa Maria di Montesanto may refer to the following churches in Italy:

- Santa Maria di Montesanto, Naples
- Santa Maria in Montesanto, Rome
