= Molo San Vincenzo Lighthouse =

Molo San Vincenzo
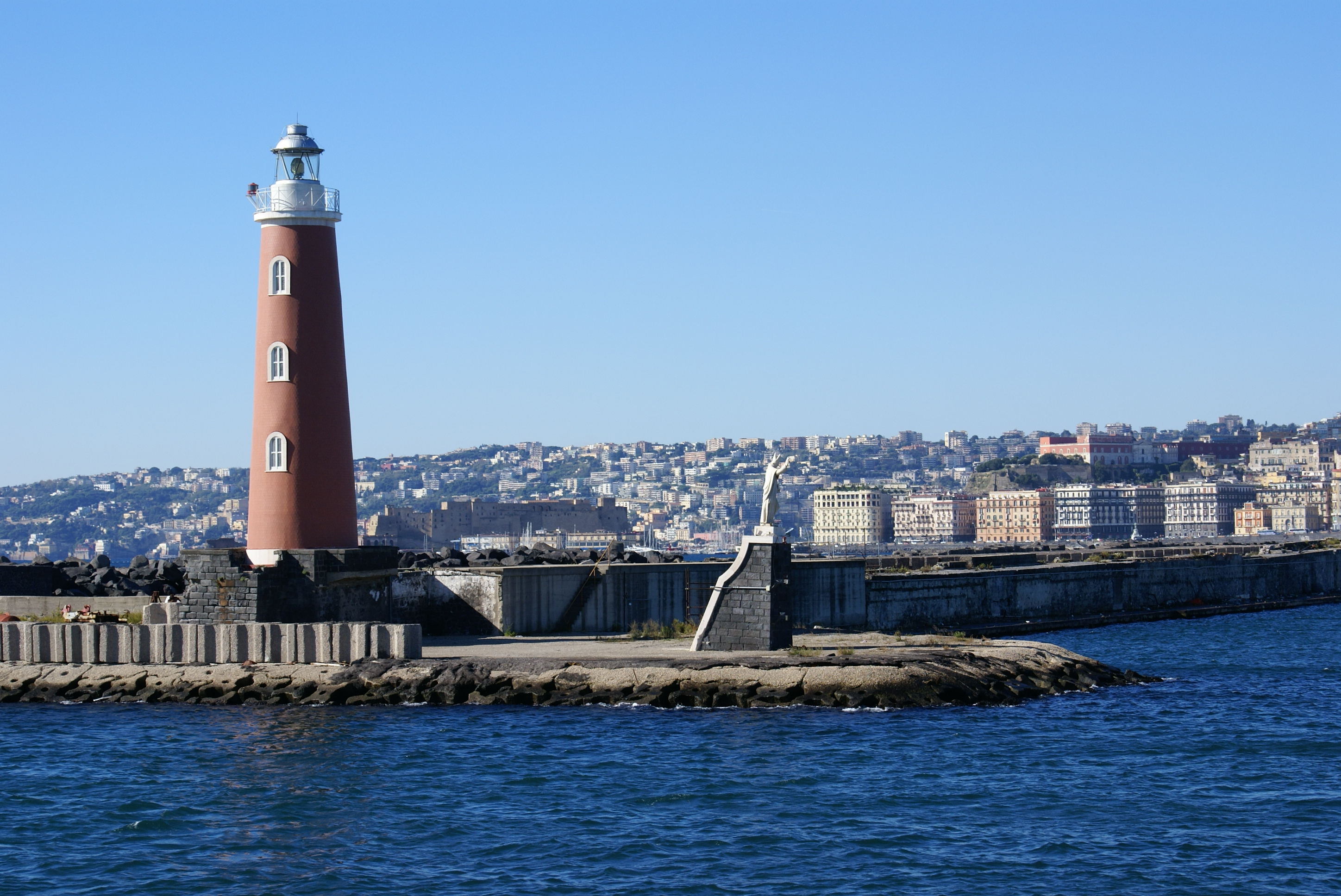
- Molo San Vincenzo Lighthouse
- Location: Naples; Campania; Italy
- Coordinates: 40°49′58″N 14°16′20″E

Tower
- Constructed: 1487(first); 1495 (second); 1843 (third)
- Foundation: stone base
- Construction: masonry tower
- Automated: yes
- Height: 24 metres (79 ft)
- Shape: cylindrical tower with balcony and lantern atop a concrete base
- Markings: red tower, white lantern, grey metallic lantern dome
- Power source: mains electricity
- Operator: Marina Militare

Light
- First lit: 1916 (current)
- Focal height: 25 metres (82 ft)
- Lens: Type OR250
- Intensity: main: AL 1000 W reserve: MBR-300L LED
- Range: main: 22 nautical miles (41 km; 25 mi) reserve: 10 nautical miles (19 km; 12 mi)
- Characteristic: Fl (2) W 15s.
- Italy no.: 2424 E.F.

Molo San Vincenzo Lighthouse (Italian: Faro di Molo San Vincenzo) is an active lighthouse located at the end of the western side to the entrance of the Port of Naples, Campania on the Tyrrhenian Sea.

== History ==
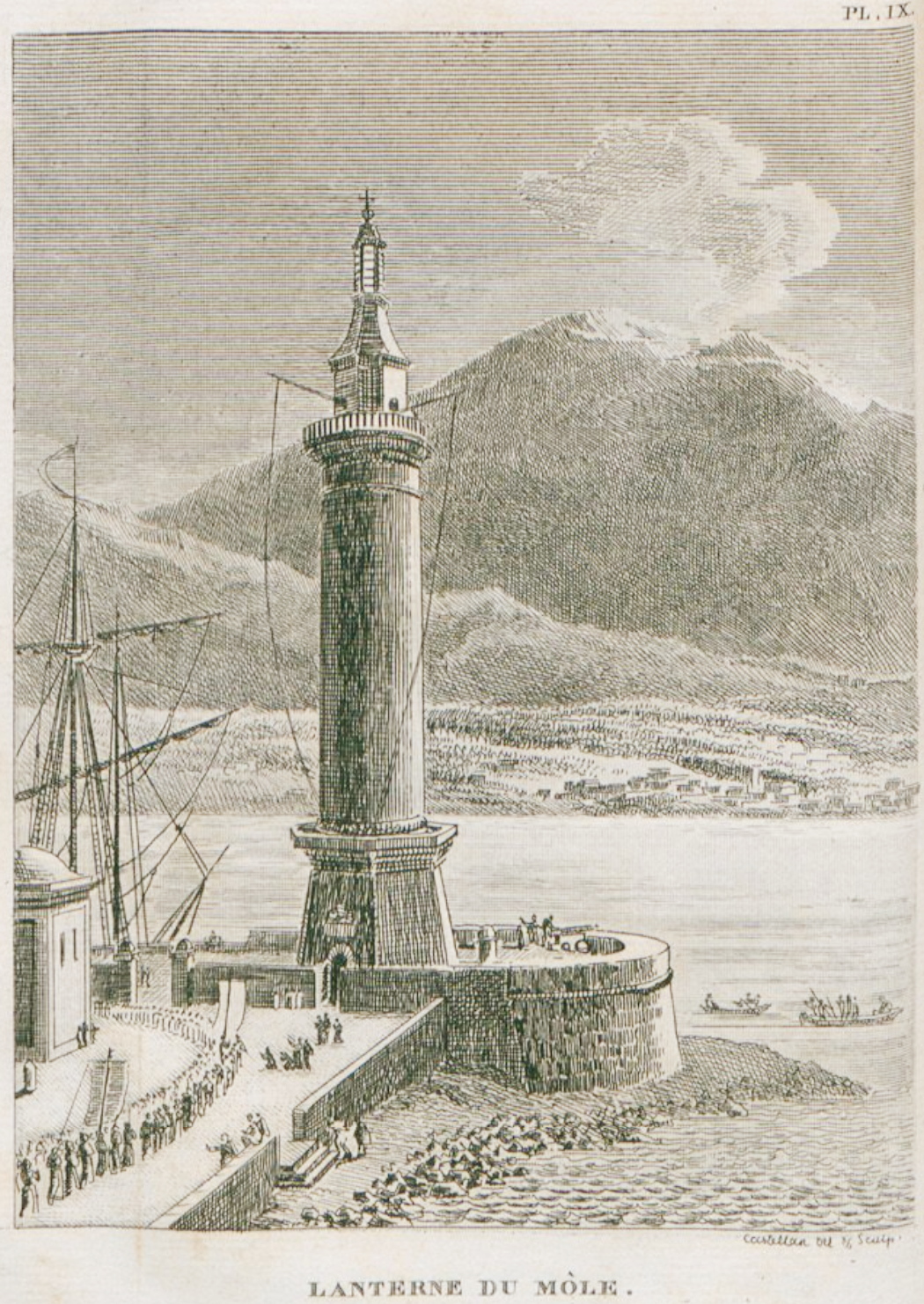
Lighthouse completed in 1626

The first lighthouse was built in 1487 under the reign of Ferdinand I of Naples on plan of Luca Bengiamo and was called Torre San Vincenzo, however the lighthouse was damaged in 1495 in the clashes between the Aragonese and the French and rebuilt under Frederick of Naples. In 1624 the lantern was destroyed by fire and the reconstruction, attributed to Pietro De Marino, was completed in 1626. In 1843 a lighthouse, 43 metres (141 ft) high, was built on the Molo Beverello and in 1933 it was destroyed in order to enlarge the harbour.

== Description ==
The current lighthouse was activated in 1916 and consists of a red masonry cylindrical tower, 24 feet (7.3 m) high, with balcony and lantern, mounted on a stone square prism block base. The tower is characterized by three windows framed in white. The lantern, painted in white and the dome in grey metallic, is positioned at 25 metres (82 ft) above sea level and emits three white flashes in a 15 seconds period, visible up to a distance of 22 nautical miles (41 km; 25 mi). The lighthouse is completely automated and is operated by the Marina Militare with the identification code number 2424 E.F.

== See also ==
- List of lighthouses in Italy
- Naples
