= Ignazio Oliva =

17th-century Italian painter

Ignazio Oliva (17th century) was an Italian painter of the Baroque period, active near his natal city of Orta di Atella. He was a pupil of Domenico Gargiulo. He is known for painting outdoor vedute: seascapes and landscapes.
