= Giuseppe Simonelli =

Italian painter

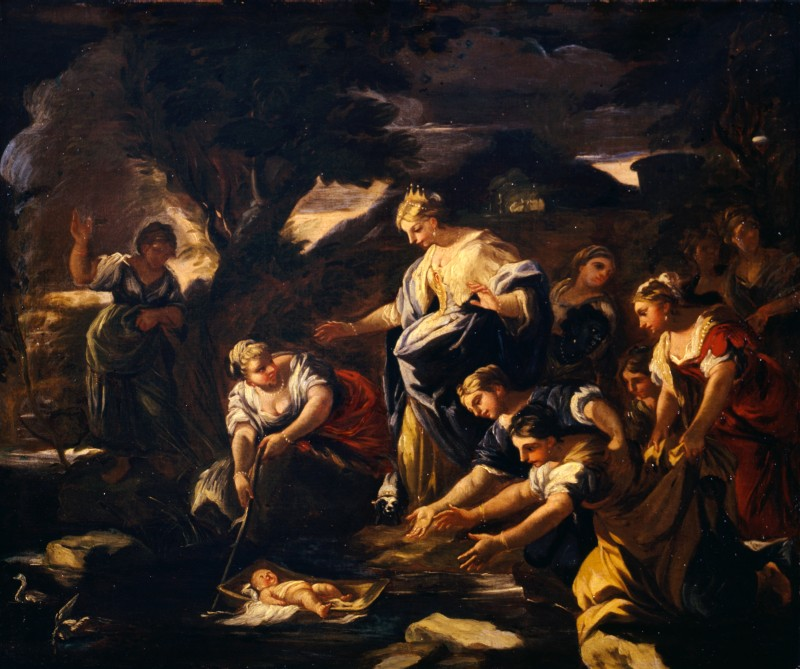
Mosè salvato dalle acque, 1675–1680 (Fondazione Cariplo)

Giuseppe Simonelli (Naples, c.1650–1710) was an Italian painter, active in a late-Baroque style.

== Biography ==
Born in Naples around 1650, Simonelli was one of the most important painters of the school of Luca Giordano. His early works were often retouched by Giordano to such a degree that some of them were confused with those of the master. He learned Giordano's art so well that when the master left Naples for the Spanish court in 1692, he was assigned the task of completing the unfinished Neapolitan works for delivery to clients. Reliable details of his own production are available as from 1686, when he received the final payment for a painting of Holy Martyrs for the Jesuit college in Trapani. His most celebrated works are the series of 28 paintings for the Church of the Annunziata in Aversa, produced between 1702 and 1703 together with his brother Gennaro. Giuseppe also painted an altarpiece for Santa Maria di Montesanto, Naples. He worked continuously right up to his death in 1710.

== Other projects ==
Media related to Giuseppe Simonelli at Wikimedia Commons
