= San Potito, Naples =

Church in Naples, Italy

Coordinates: 45°51′07.5″N 14°14′56.9″E

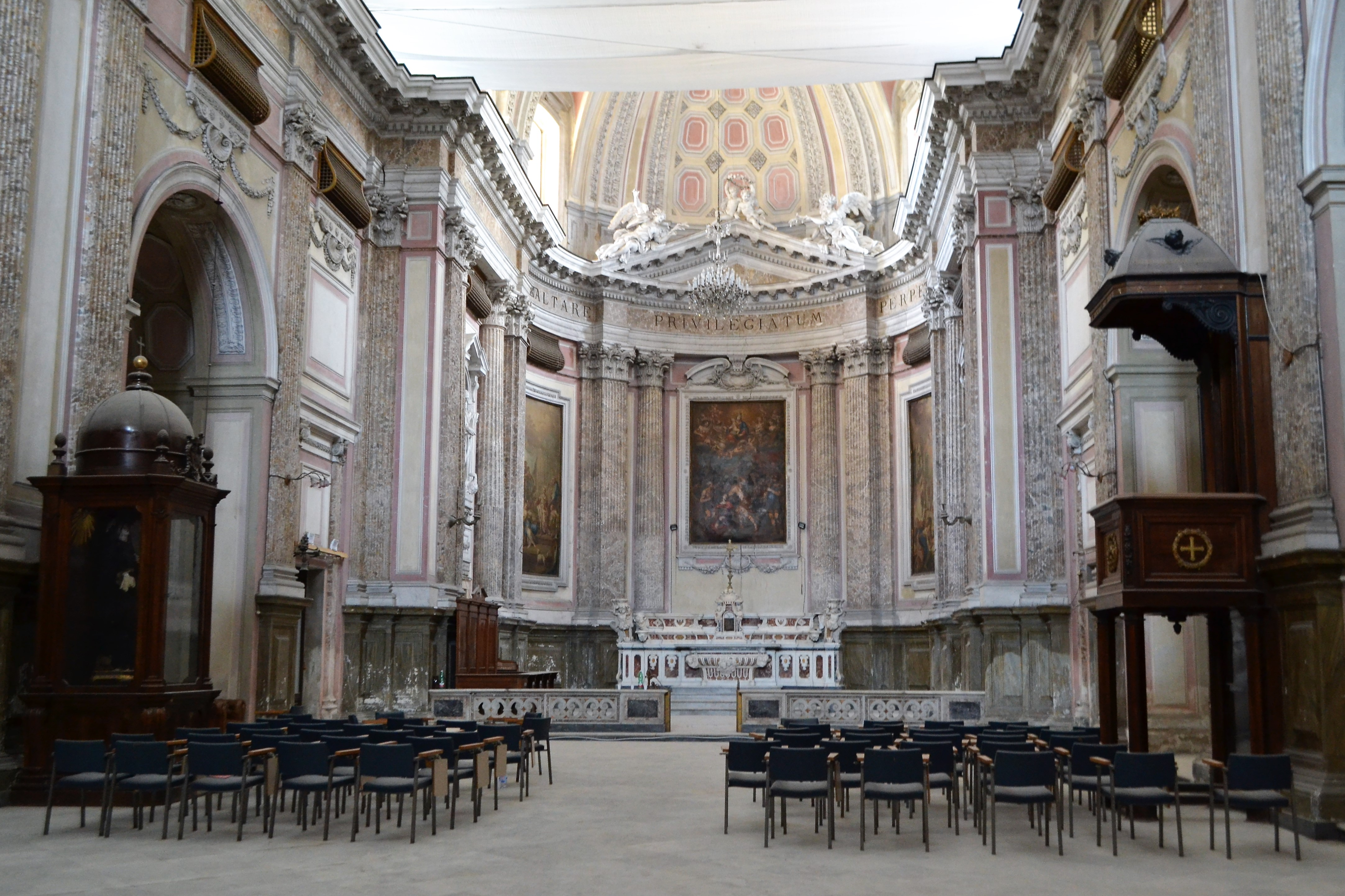
Interior

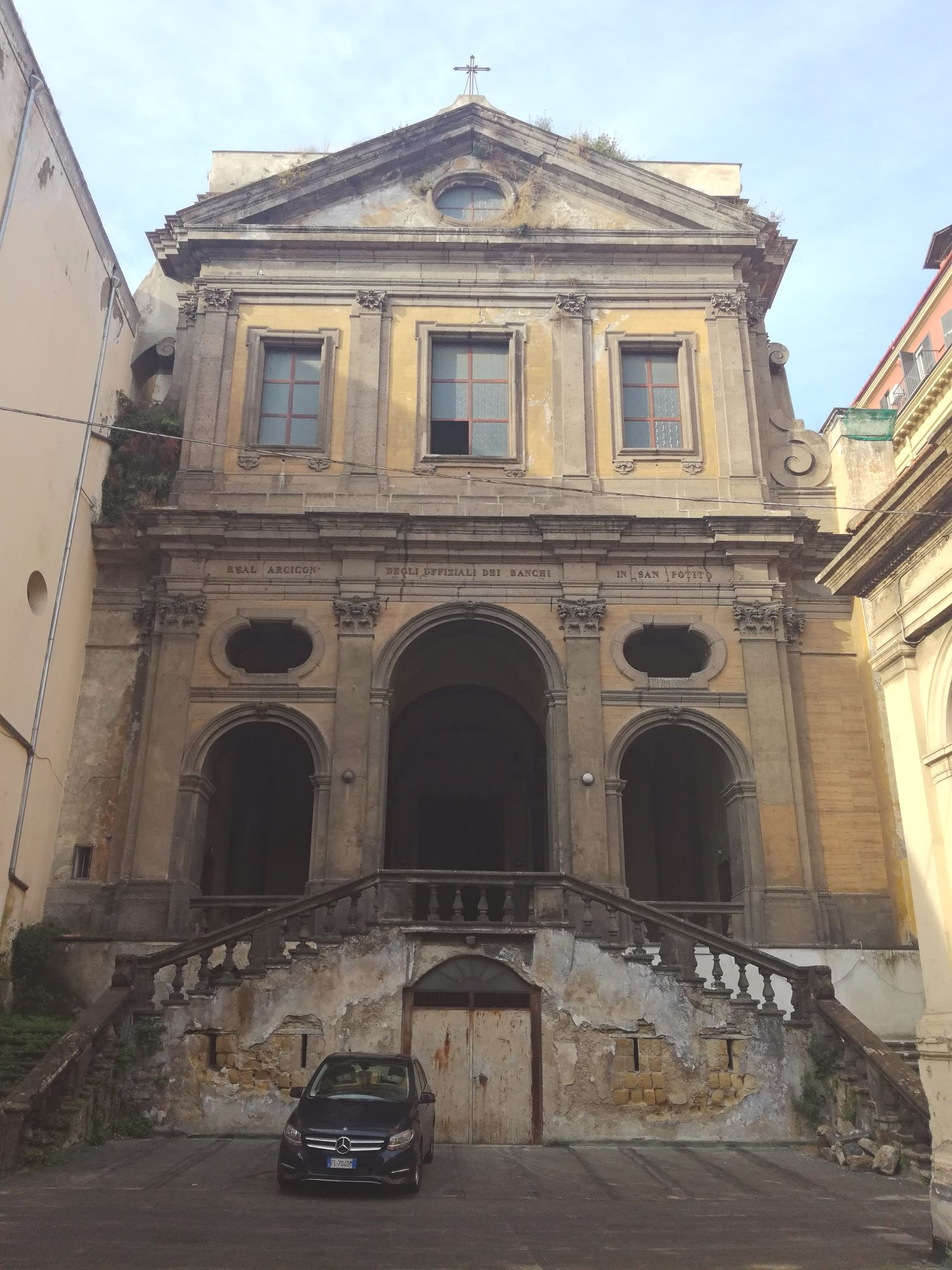
Exterior

San Potito is a church in Naples dedicated to Potitus, who was tortured to death in Epirus or Ascoli in 166. It is located on the San Potito hill on via Tommaso Salvatori.

It was built in the first half of the 17th century in the Mannerist style to plans by Pietro de Marino. It was intended as the monastery church for a community of Benedictines which had initially been founded as Basilians. The monastery buildings were restored in 1780. During the French invasion of Italy the monastery's lands and goods were confiscated and the monks expelled in 1809 under Joachim Murat, with some of them moving into the church of San Gregorio Armeno. The monastery buildings were turned into infantry barracks and later carabinieri barracks. The church is still deconsecrated and closed to the public.

It has a single nave with three chapels on each side. The interior is richly decorated with stucco, though its main features are its 18th-century high altar. The high altarpiece is surmounted by three paintings - Niccolò de Simone's 1654 Saint Potitus pierced by a burning nail making the emperor Antoninus share his pain, flanked by Giacinto Diano's 1784 Saint Potitus felling an idol and Saint Potitus curing the madness of Antoninus' daughter Agnes. Diano also painted a 1791 depiction of the Immaculate Conception in the third chapel on the right, whilst in the first chapel on the right is Luca Giordano's 1663-65 Our Lady of the Rosary. A 17th-century Calvary is in the first chapel on the left, the second chapel on the left has stucco depicting Saint Cajetan and the third chapel on the left has a painting of Our Lady with Saints Antony the Great and Roch by Andrea Vaccaro. The sacristy contains two paintings by Pacecco de Rosa and Domenico Mondo.
