= Domenico Gargiulo =

Italian painter

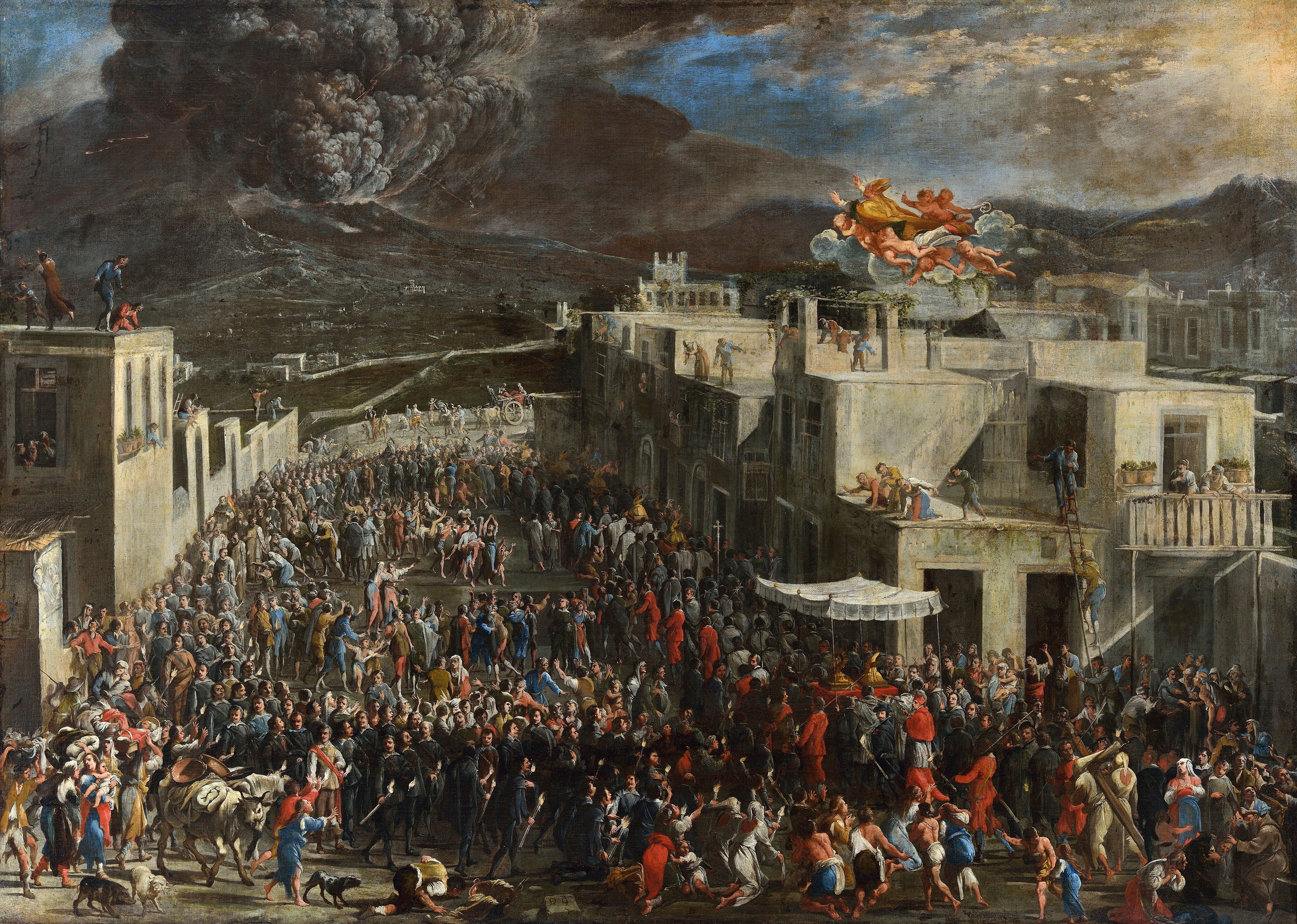
- The eruption of the Vesuvius in 1631
- Born: c. 1609-1610; Naples, Italy
- Died: c. 1675 (aged 64–66); Naples, Italy
- Other name: Micco Spadaro
- Education: Aniello Falcone
- Occupations: Painter, draughtsman
- Known for: landscape painting; genre painting

Domenico Gargiulo called Micco Spadaro (c. 1609 or 1610 – c. 1675) was an Italian painter of the Baroque period, mainly active in Naples and known for his landscapes, genre scenes, and history paintings.

== Life ==
=== Early life and education ===
Domenico Gargiulo was the son of a sword maker. This earned Domenico the nickname 'Micco Spadaro' ('spadaro' means 'sword maker'). He was trained in the workshop of the battle painter Aniello Falcone, where he was a contemporary of Andrea di Leone and Salvator Rosa.

His early works were influenced by Paul Bril whose works he must have known from Bril's 1602 landscape frescoes in the atrium of Santa Maria Regina Coeli in Naples. He was also influenced by Filippo Napoletano. Spadaro’s earliest known works are two dated circular genre scenes, the Fortune Teller and the Inn (both 1636), both close in style to contemporary Roman bambocciante painting. In 1638 he began the fresco decoration of the choir of the Frati Conversi in the Certosa di San Martino, Naples, with fictive tapestries showing scenes from the Old Testament and Carthusian legends in wild and mysterious natural settings. The Carthusians then commissioned him to fresco the prior’s apartment at San Martino (1642–7) with the Baptism, a View of Naples and various landscapes with hermits. Two bozzetti, Landscape with Saints Anthony and Paul and Landscape with Saint Onofrio (both Naples, Museo di Capodimonte), also survive. The freshness and spontaneity of the frescoed landscapes are the result of his sketching expeditions around Naples; the works are wild scenes, with jagged tree trunks and distant views, vibrant with light, and with small bays and rocky cliffs.

In this period Spadaro frequently collaborated with Viviano Codazzi on pictures in which the architectural perspectives were painted by Codazzi and the figures by Spadaro; a typical example is the Villa Poggio Reale (1641; Besançon, Musée des Beaux-Arts et d'Archéologie). Also in 1641 Spadaro produced one of his rare paintings with large figures, the Last Supper (Naples, Santa Maria della Sapienza). He was susceptible to the influence of other painters, which partly explains the diverse and even contradictory stylistic tendencies of this phase of his work. His many paintings of Old Testament scenes and martyrdoms, such as the Martyrdom of Saint Stephen (Madison, U. WI, Elvehjem Art Center), are crowded with small, elegantly gesticulating figures set in wild landscapes enriched with ruined Classical architecture. They borrow motifs from the etchings of Callot and are indebted in composition and figure style to Johann Heinrich Schönfeld (in Naples from about 1638).

=== Mature work ===
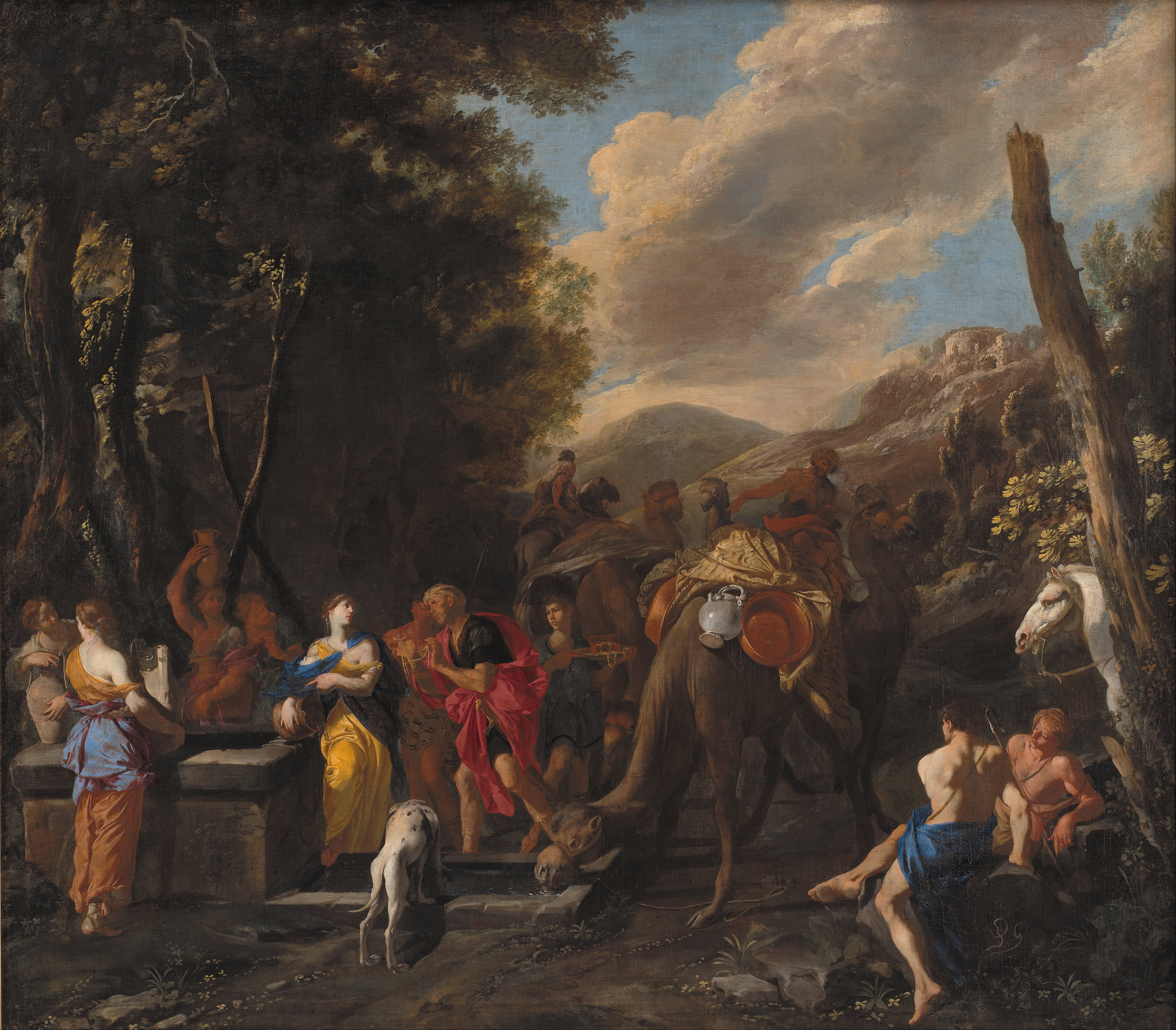
Rebecca and Eliezer at the Well, Copenhagen, National Gallery of Denmark

Spadaro’s ambitious attempts at monumental pictures, such as the Virgin and Child with Saints John and Paul (late 1640s; Naples, Santa Maria Donnaromita), are weak evocations of Massimo Stanzione’s classicizing manner. Only in his later years did Spadaro achieve a definitive personal style with his celebrated paintings of important episodes from recent Neapolitan history. These include three pictures probably painted between 1656 and 1660 and still all together in the collection of the Cavaliere Antonio Piscicelli when de' Dominici was publishing his Vite (1742–5). They are the Procession to Invoke Saint Januarius during the Eruption of Vesuvius in 1631 (Naples, Baron Giuseppe Carelli priv. col.), the Revolt of Masaniello in 1647 (c. 1657) and the View of the Piazza del Mercato during the Plague of 1656. Other late works in this vein include small paintings showing scenes from the Neapolitan Revolt of 1647 (all Naples, National Museum of San Martino). All these works show topographically accurate views of parts of the city, filled with crowds of ordinary people, among whom the protagonists of the historical dramas mingle.

In addition to his narrative talent Spadaro was an attentive chronicler who, despite the dramatic nature of the events depicted, enjoyed adding interesting and at times amusing details with a real feeling for pictorial immediacy. In these works Spadaro abandoned the ironic imagery of Callot and della Bella. This was not a consistent shift towards realism, however, for other works of the same period – bambocciate, mythological and religious scenes (all much in demand among connoisseurs) – are animated by a spirit of imaginative fantasy. The Martyrdom of Saint Agatha and the Martyrdom of Saint Ursula (both Naples, priv. col.) are examples of the religious paintings of this period.

Many drawings by Spadaro survive, and most of them are rapidly executed in pen and ink, deeply influenced by Jusepe de Ribera and close in style to the drawings of Salvator Rosa. There is a large collection in Berlin (Kupferstichkabinett). He was patronized by collectors such as Gaspar Roomer. None of the work of his final years is known. Among his pupils were Pietro Pesce and Ignazio Oliva.

== Gallery ==
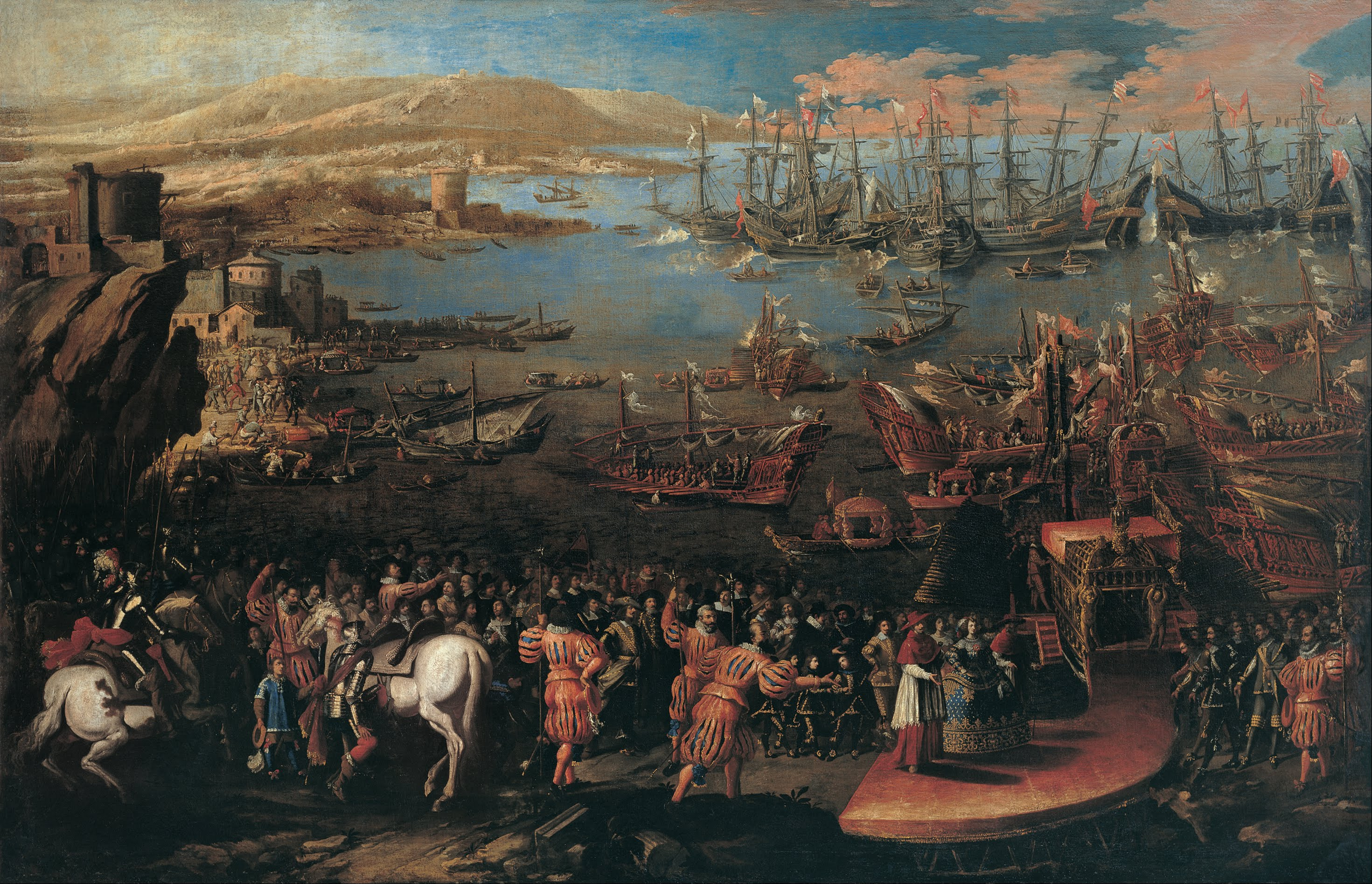
The landing of the Infanta Maria in Naples. 1649. Oil on canvas. Santander Bank Foundation, Madrid

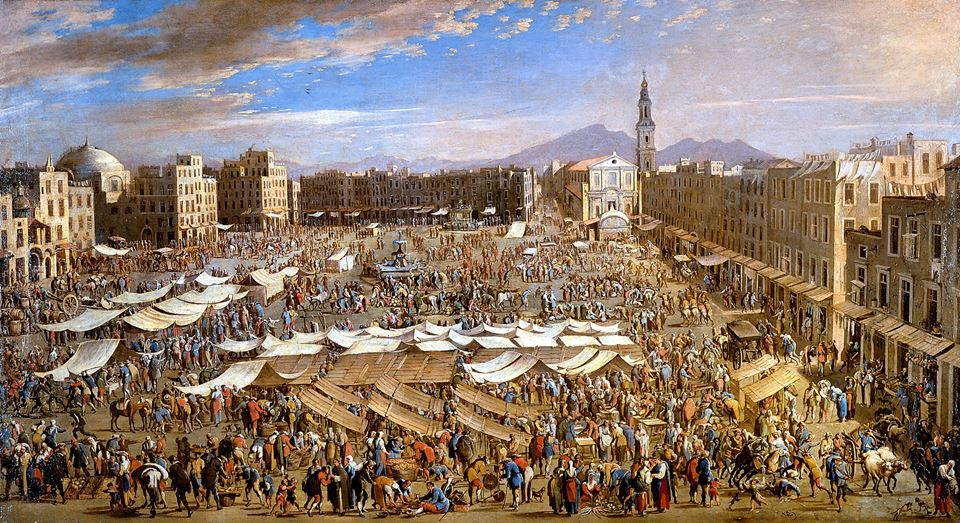
Market Square of Naples. Between 1648 and 1652. Oil on canvas. Private collection

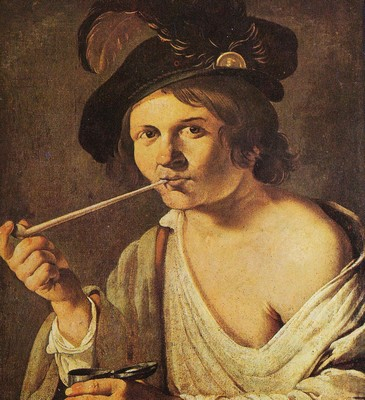
Portrait of Masaniello. Circa 1647. Oil on canvas. National Museum of San Martino, Naples

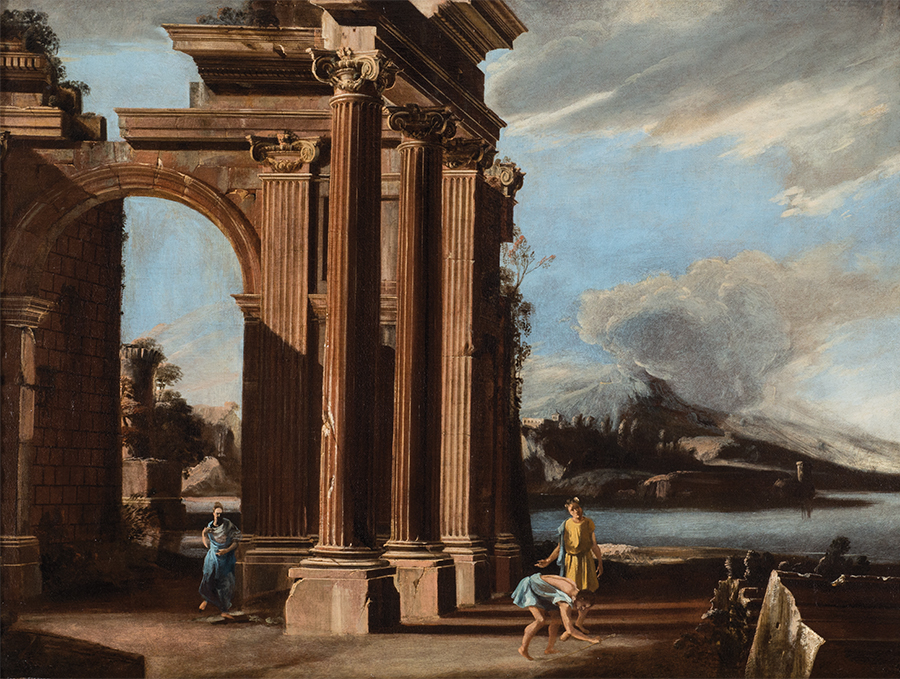
N. Codazzi and D. Gargiulo. Eruption of Vesuvius with Architecture and Figures. Between 1660 and 1693. Oil on canvas. Private collection

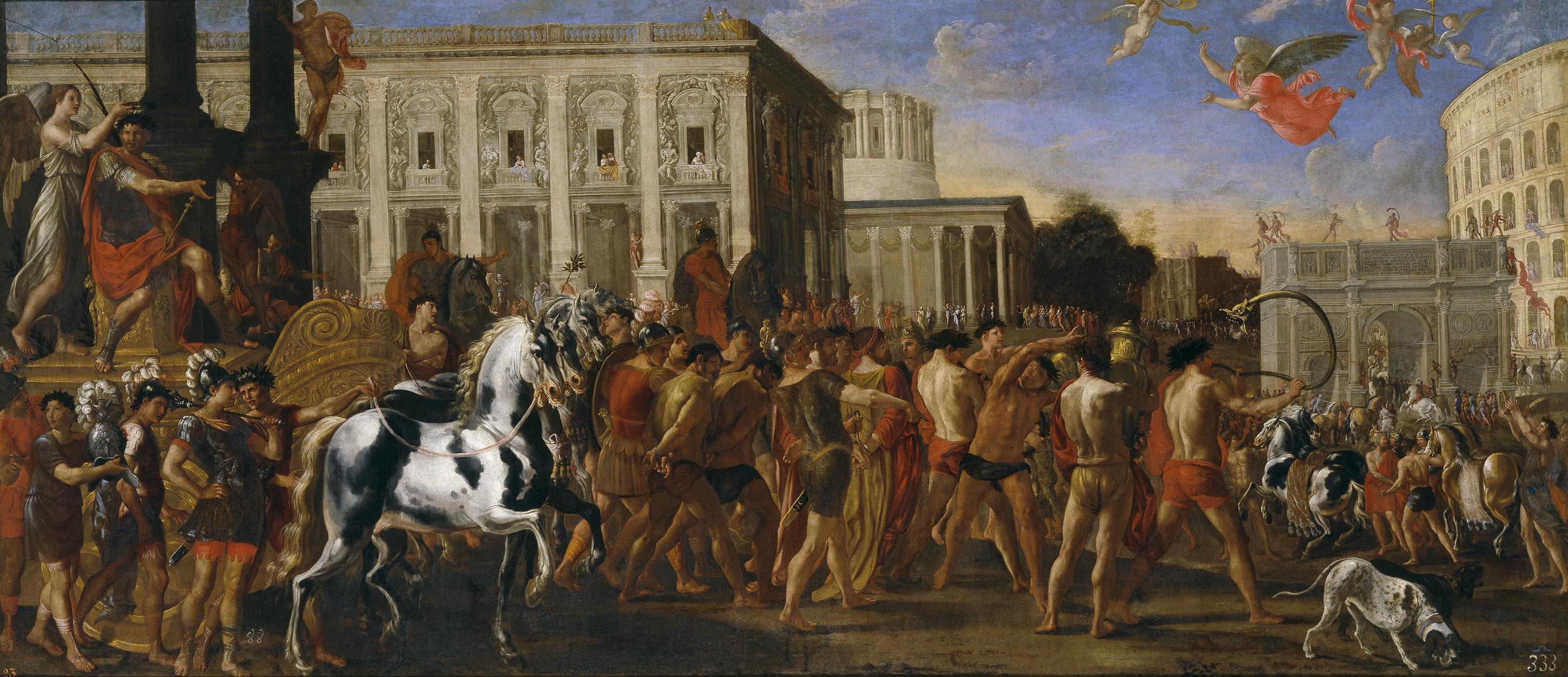
V. Codazzi and D. Gargiulo. Triumphal Entry of Constantine in Rome. Circa 1638. Oil on canvas. Museo del Prado, Madrid

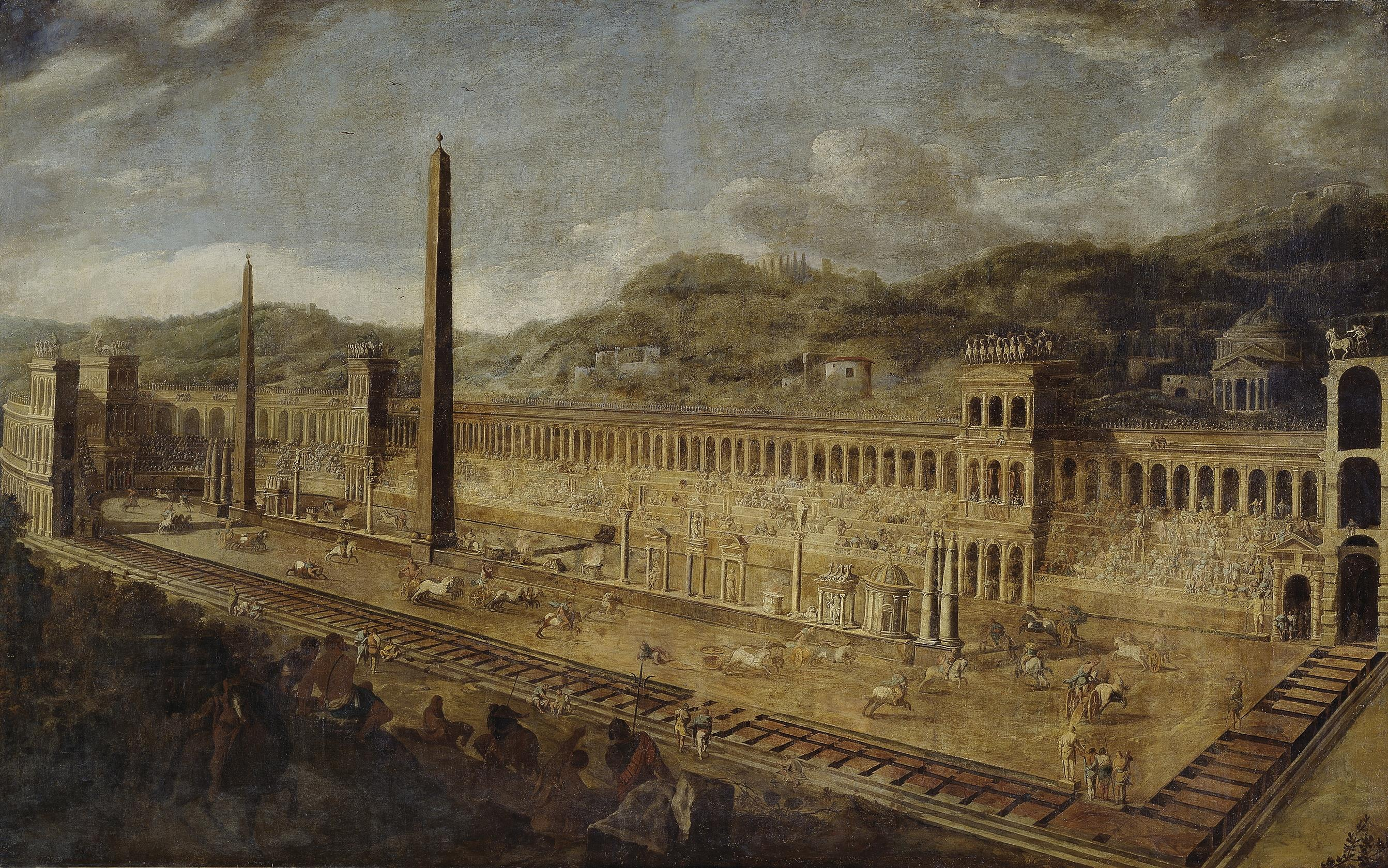
V. Codazzi and D. Gargiulo. Circus Maximus in Rome. Circa 1638. Oil on canvas. Museo del Prado, Madrid

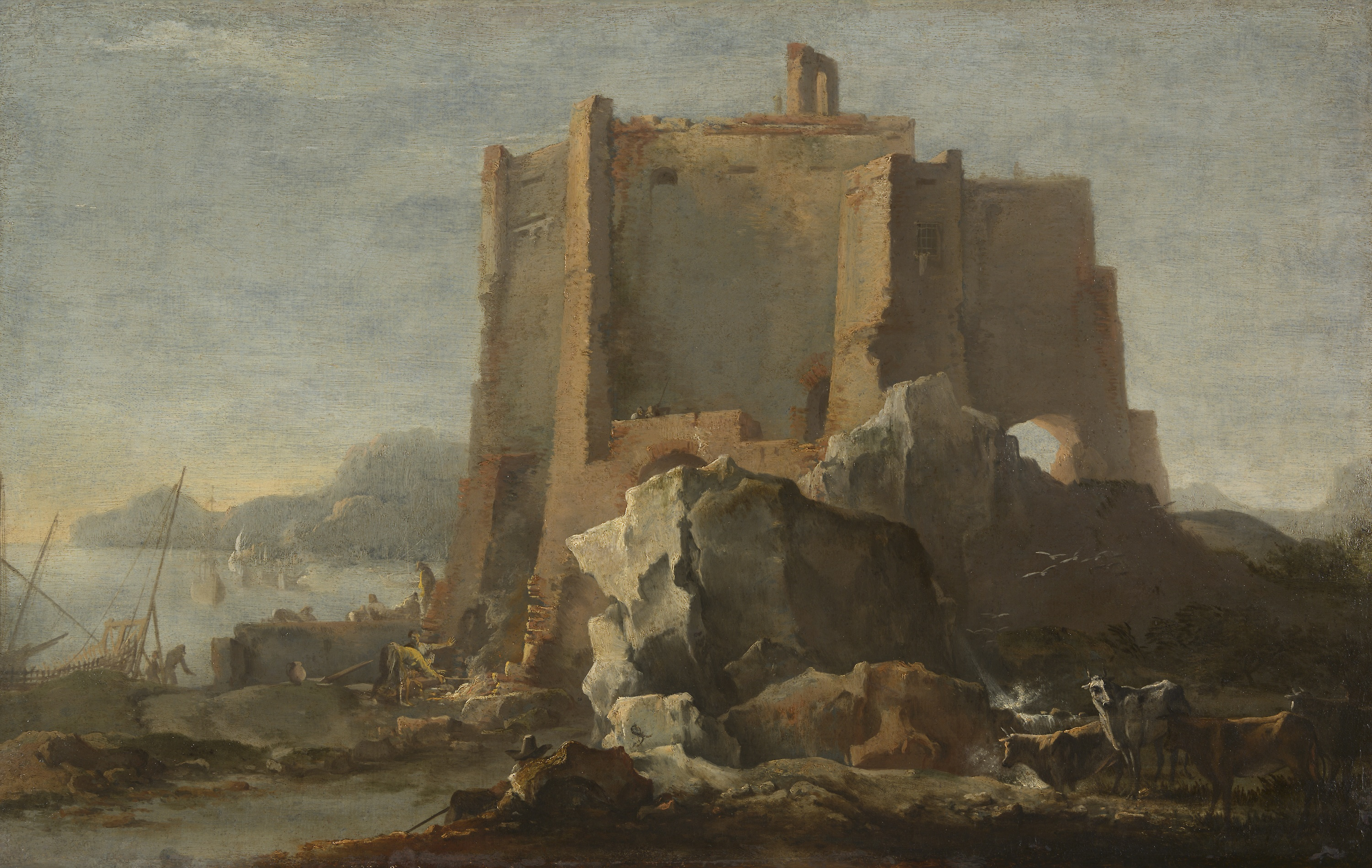
Landscape with Rock and Fortress, Art Institute of Chicago

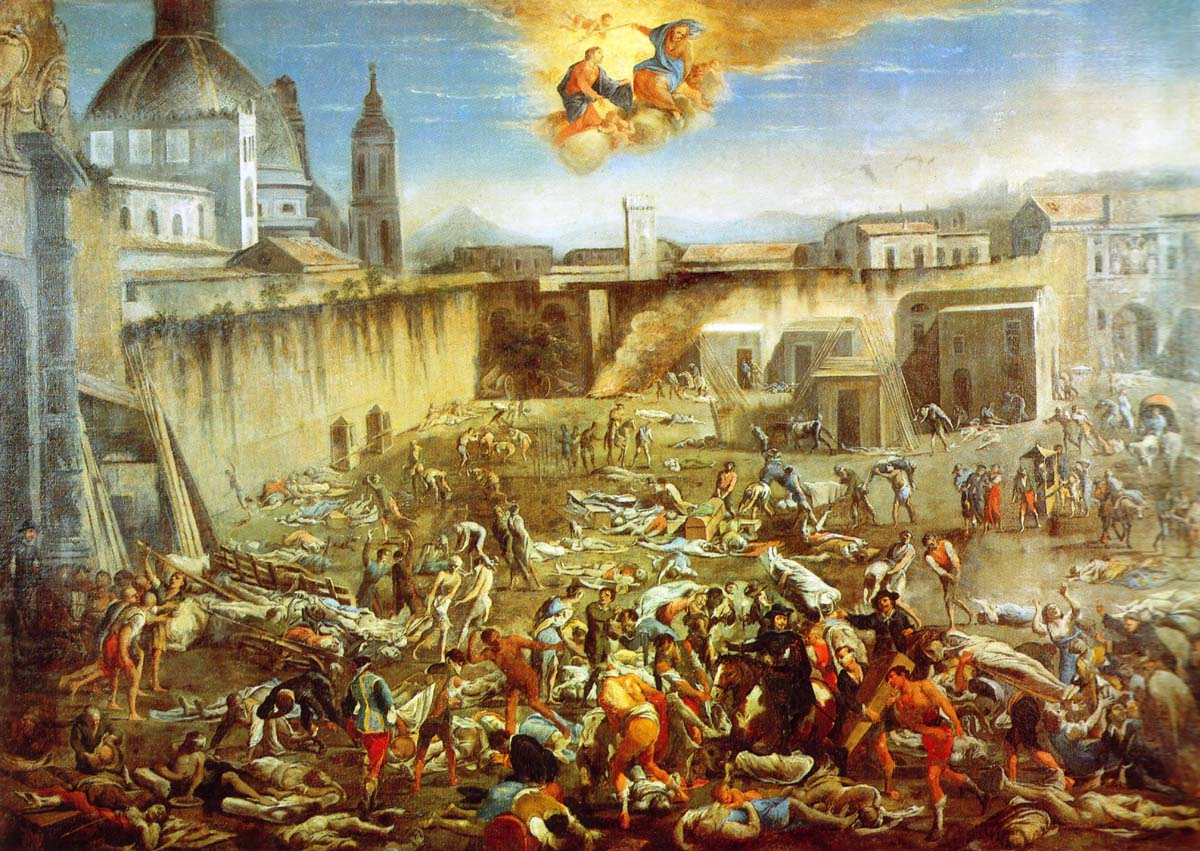
Market Square of Naples during the Plague of 1656, National Museum of San Martino, Naples

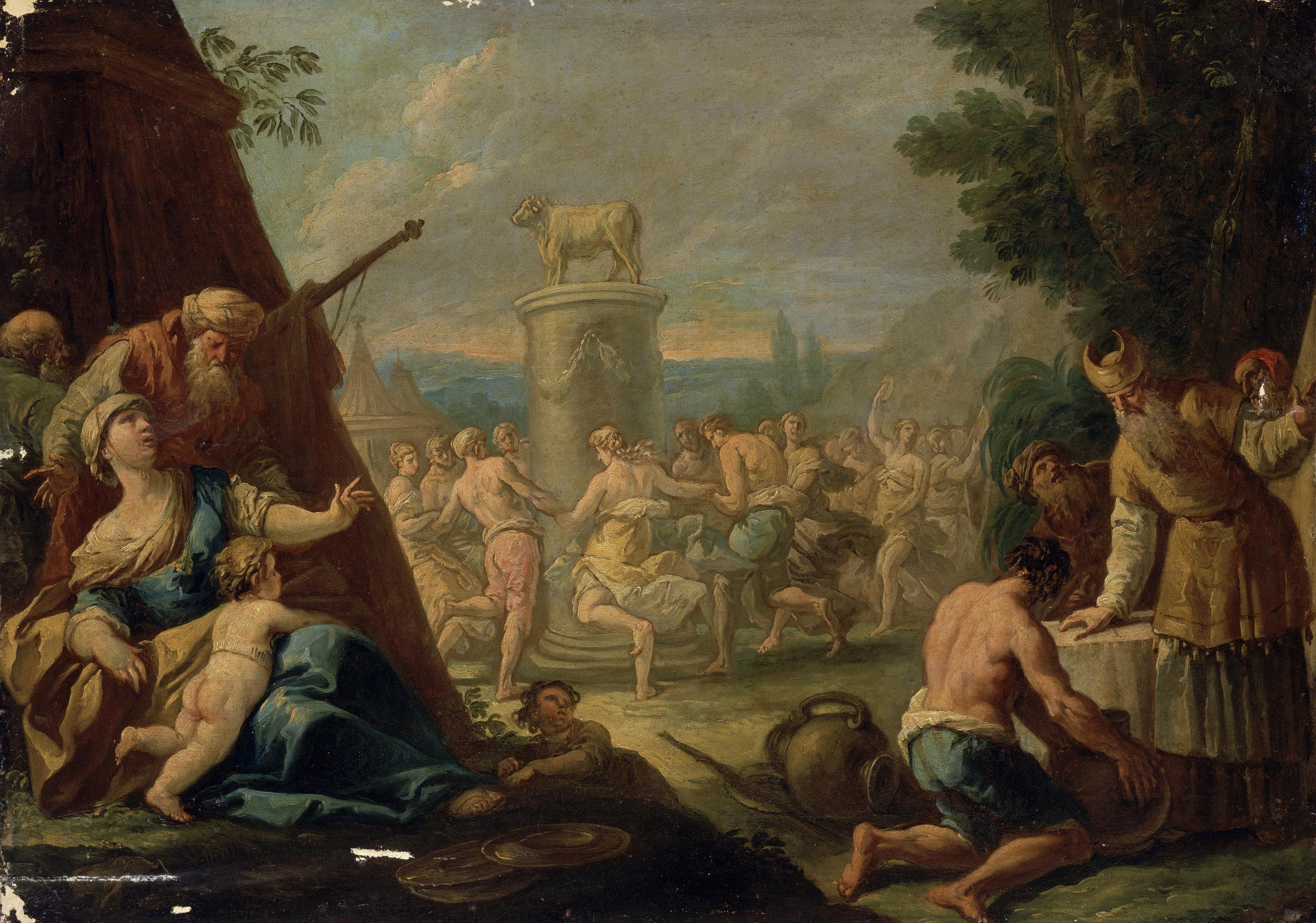
Adoration of the Golden Calf, Hermitage Museum, Moscow

== Bibliography ==
- Dominici, Bernardo de' (1745). Vite de' pittori, scultori, ed architetti napoletani. Vol. III. Naples. pp. 190–213.
- Ceci, Giuseppe (1905). "Domenico Gargiulo detto Micco Spadaro". Napoli nobilissima: Rivista bimestrale di arte figurativa, archeologia e urbanistica. 14: 66–8, 104–8.
- Causa, Raffaello (1946). "Appunti sulla formazione di Micco Spadaro". Il Sagittario. 2: 26–30.
- Causa, Raffaello (1956). ‘L’eruzione del Vesuvio nel 1631': Un dipinto di Micco Spadaro e un poemetto di G. Bernazzano. Naples.
- Roworth, Wendy Wassyng (1993). "The Evolution of History Painting: Masaniello's Revolt and Other Disasters in Seventeenth-century Naples". Art Bulletin. 75 (2): 219–34. doi:10.1080/00043079.1993.10786536.
- Schütze, Sebastian (1995). "Domenico Gargiulo detto Micco Spadaro. Paesaggista e 'cronista' napoletano". The Burlington Magazine. pp. 624–625.
- Farquhar, Maria (1855). Ralph Nicholson Wornum (ed.). Biographical catalogue of the principal Italian painters. London: Woodfall & Kinder. p. 69.
