= Santa Maria della Pace, Naples =

Church building in Naples, Italy

Church of Santa Maria della Pace
- Chiesa di Santa Maria della Pace
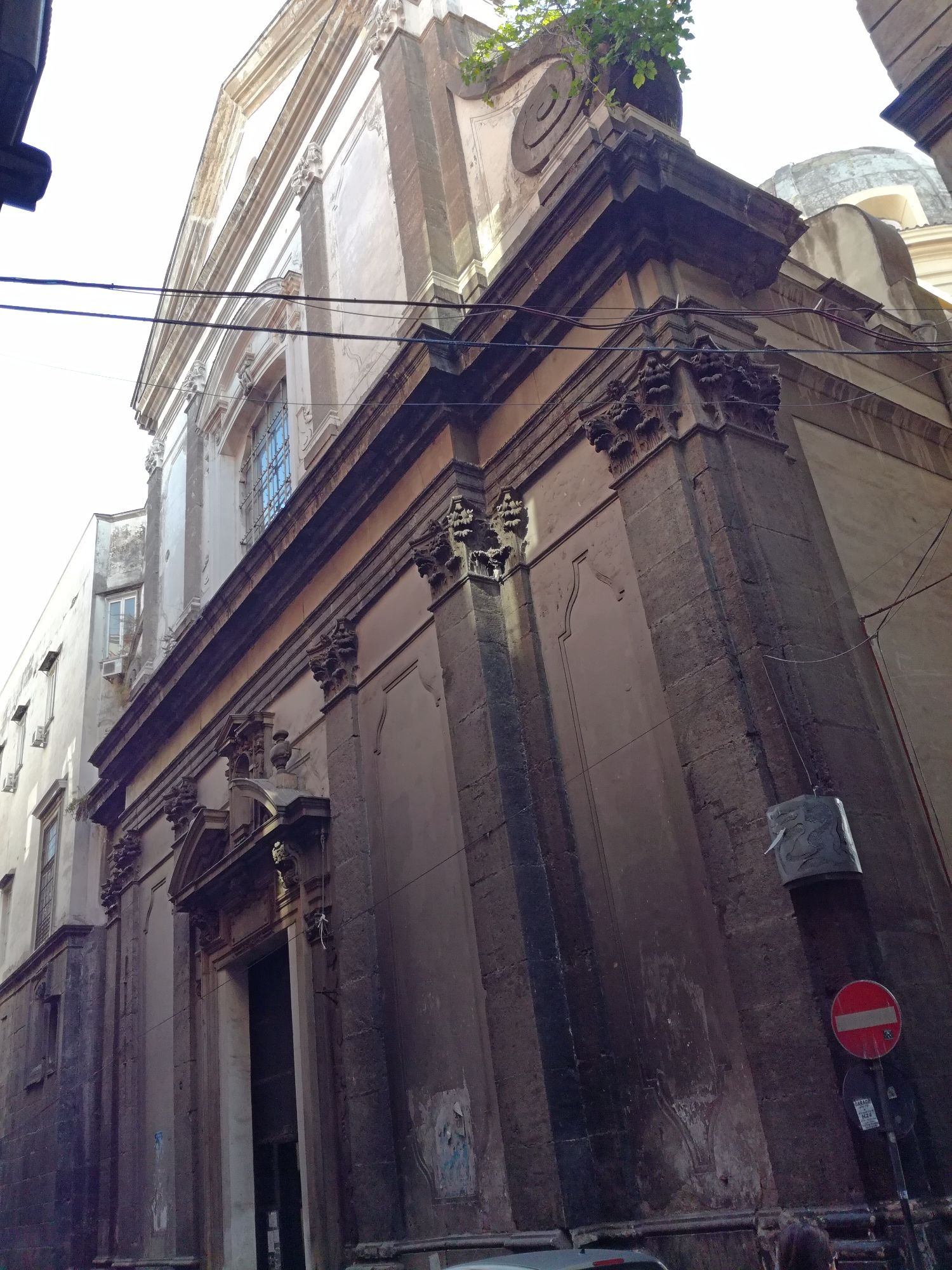
- The façade of Santa Maria della Pace.
- Church of Santa Maria della Pace
- 40.85231°N 14.261925°E
- Location: Via dei Tribunali; Naples; Province of Naples, Campania
- Country: Italy
- Denomination: Roman Catholic

History
- Status: Active

Architecture
- Architectural type: Church
- Style: Baroque architecture

Administration
- Diocese: Roman Catholic Archdiocese of Naples

Santa Maria della Pace is a Roman Catholic church attached to a monastery and hospital, located on Via dei Tribunali corner with Via Castel Capuano, just after the piazzetta Sedil Capuano, in Naples, Italy.

== History ==
The church and the attached Sala del Lazzaretto (Hall of the Leprosarium) were built in the 16th century. The monastic complex of Santa Maria della Pace includes the Hospital of the Order of brothers of the Hospital of San Giovanni di Dio (built 1587). The complex is arranged around a more ancient palace built by Giovanni Caracciolo in the early 15th century (designed by Andrea Ciccione). The Gothic entrance archway is a residua of the earliest palace.

Pietro De Marino designed the church (built 1629–1659); it was consecrated to Holy Mary of Peace, because it was the last year of the agreed peace and truce between Louis XIV of France and Philip IV of Spain. The church has a Latin cross plan. The interior was restored after the earthquake of 1732 by Domenico Antonio Vaccaro; by Donato Massa and decorated with Majolica tiles. The apse was designed by Nicola Tagliacozzi Canale.

== Sala del Lazzaretto ==
The Hall of the Leprosarium is entered through a grand staircase to the left of the vestibule. It was so called, because in this room of the hospital were tended individuals with leprosy, the plague, and other infectious maladies. An elevated gallery runs along the sides of the walls, from which, to avoid contagion, drinks and food were handed to the patients. Frescoes by Andrea Viola and Giacinto Diano are in the ceilings above the window.

== Gallery ==
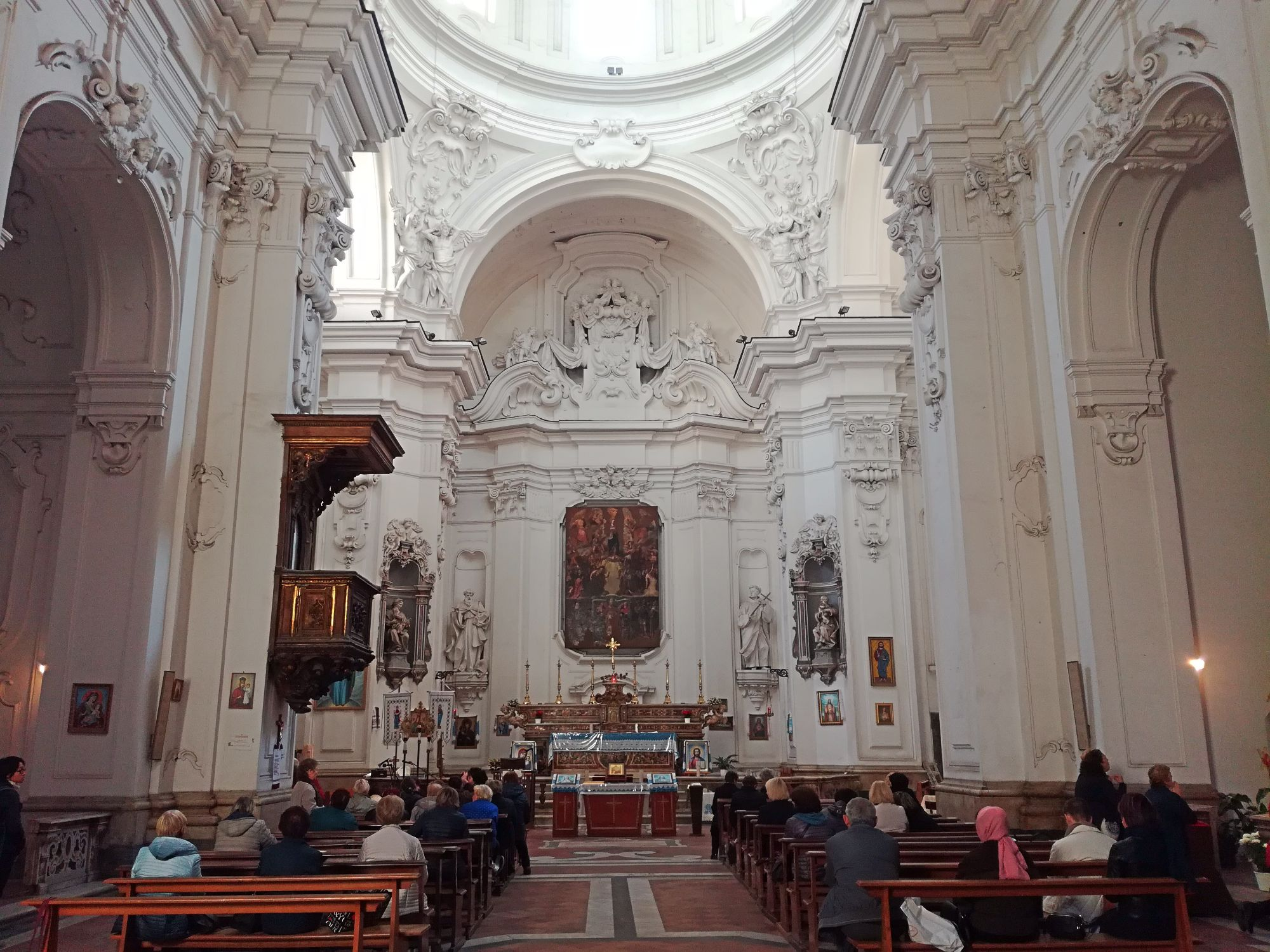
Nave

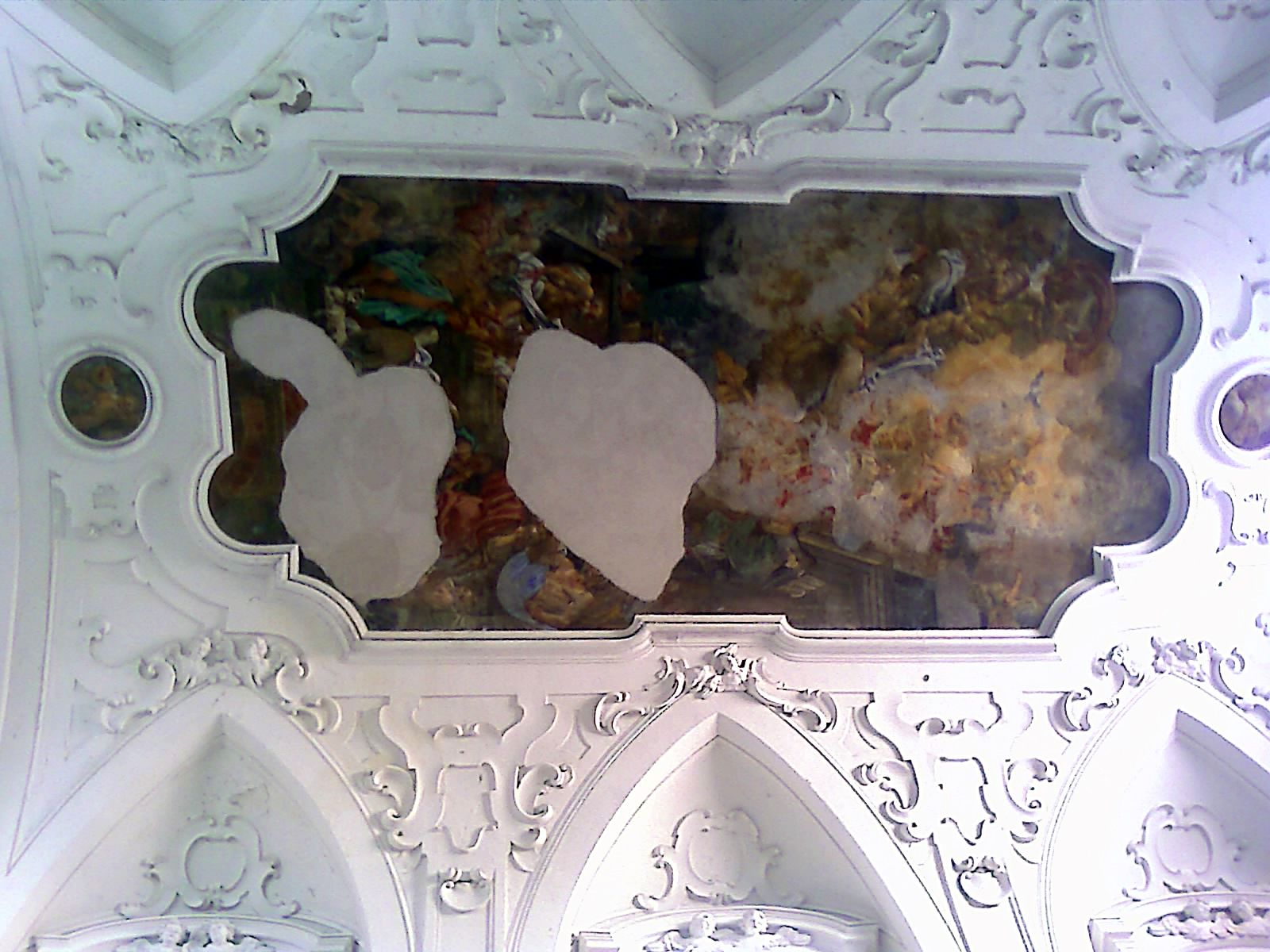
Frescoed ceiling

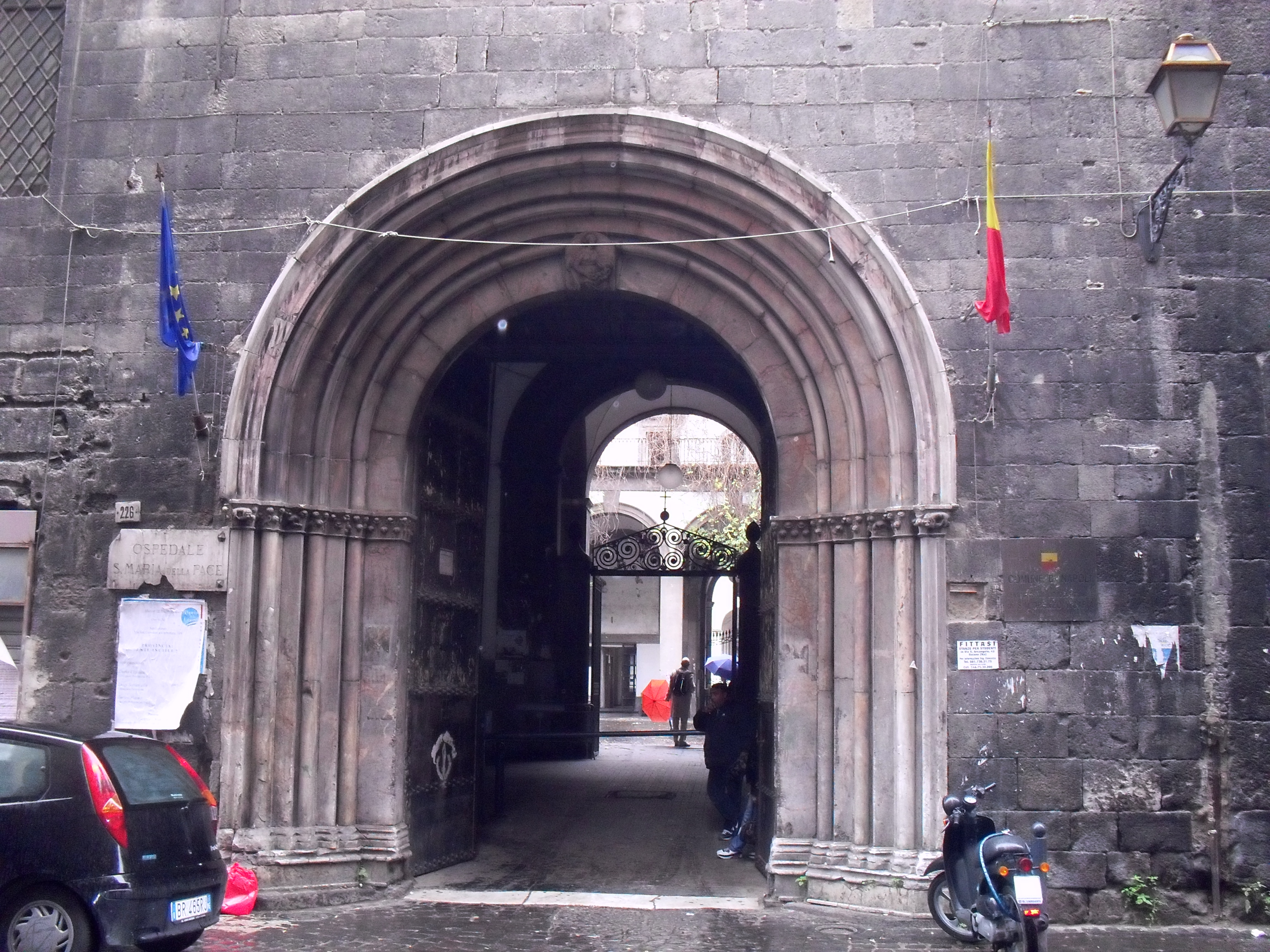
Entry to Hospital

== Bibliography ==
- Vincenzo Regina, Le chiese di Napoli. Viaggio indimenticabile attraverso la storia artistica, architettonica, letteraria, civile e spirituale della Napoli sacra, Newton and Compton editor, Naples 2004.
