= Pietro de Marino =

Italian architect (died 1673)

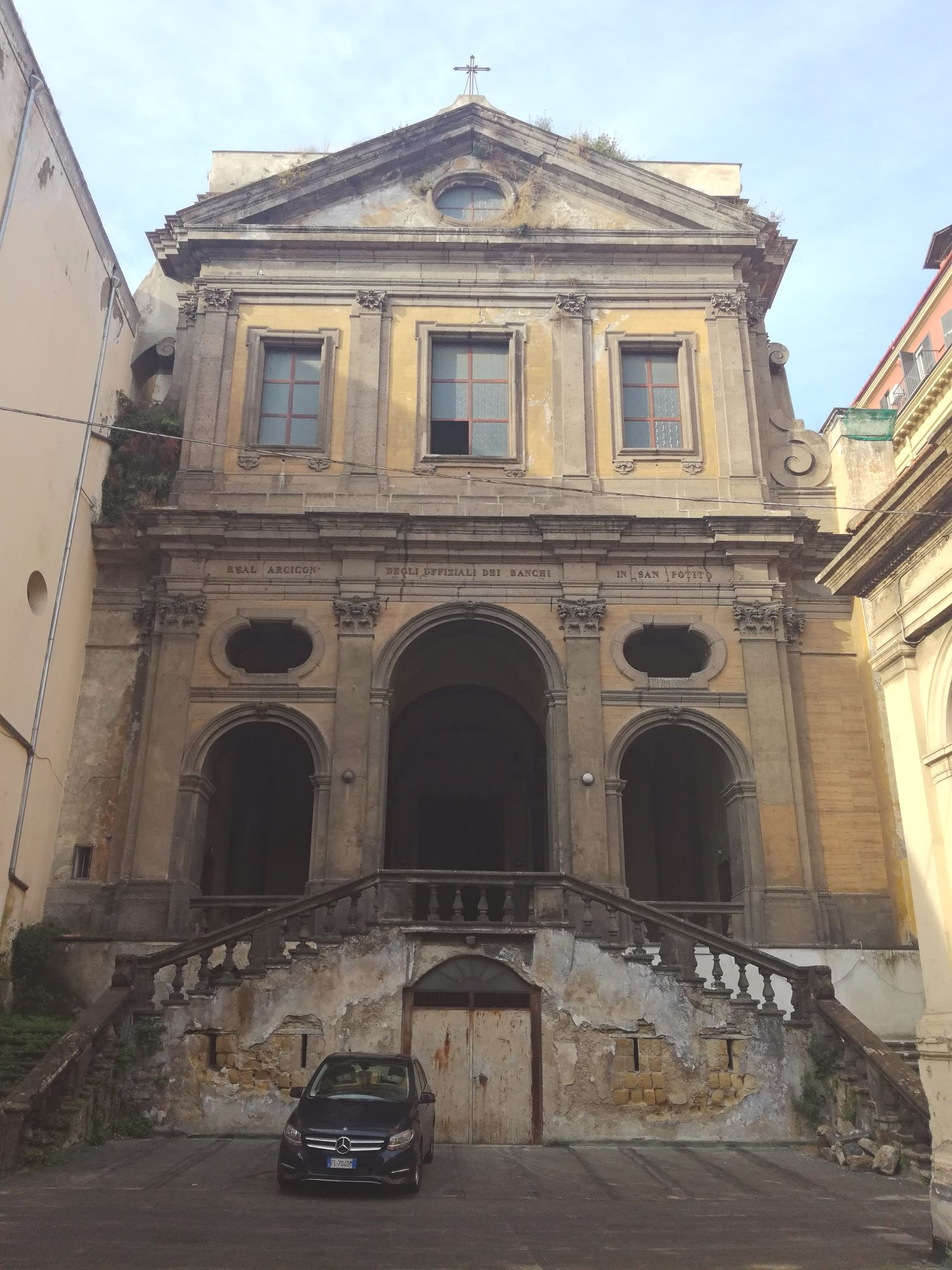
Façade of the church of San Potito

Pietro de Marino (died 1673, Naples) was an Italian architect.

Born in Naples and active there between 1629 and 1666, his works include the former church of San Potito.

== Life ==
He began his career as a collaborator of Bartolomeo Picchiatti. Between 1643 and 1654, he worked for the group of oblates founded by sister Orsola Benincasa (1547–1618). The viceroy became his patron and in 1654 de Marino and the engineer Natale Longo jointly edited a book on cloister wall of the hermitage of the Certosa di San Martino monastery complex.

He designed several churches in Naples, most notably that of Santa Maria di Montesanto – he designed its whole monastery complex, though the church's dome was built after his death by Dionisio Lazzari. He also designed the church of San Potito and its associated monastery, along with Santa Maria della Pace and the coffered ceiling of Santa Maria Regina Coeli. He and Giovanni Mozzetta restored San Pietro ad Aram.

At the end of his life de Marino also designed Santi Bernardo e Margherita, though like Santa Maria della Pace this was largely rebuilt and reordered in the 18th century.

== Bibliography (in Italian) ==
- Francesco Domenico Moccia e Dante Caporali, NapoliGuida-Tra Luoghi e Monumenti della città storica, Clean, 2001
- Aurelio De Rose, I Palazzi di Napoli. Storia, curiosità e aneddoti che si tramadano da secoli su questi straordinari testimoni della vita partenopea, Newton e Compton editori, Napoli, 2004.
- Napoli e Dintorni, TCI, 2007
