= Regina Coeli Convent Church =

Church building in Mexico City, Mexico

- Iglesia del Convento de Regina Coeli
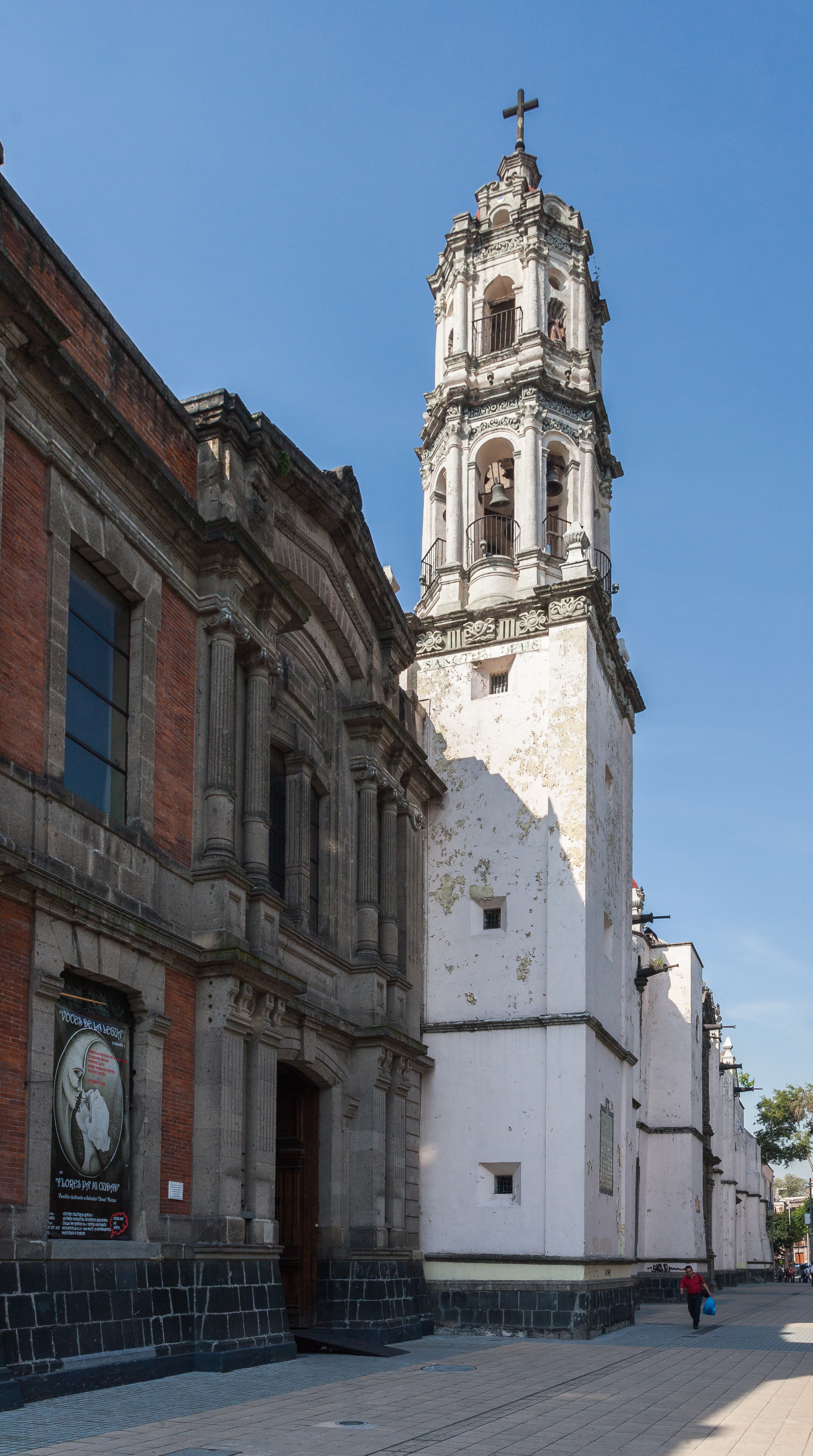

- Location within Mexico

Religion
- Affiliation: Roman Catholic
- Diocese: Roman Catholic Archdiocese of Mexico
- Ecclesiastical or organisational status: Parish church
- Year consecrated: 1731

Location
- Location: Mexico City, Mexico
- Coordinates: 19°25′40.95″N 99°8′20.46″W

Architecture
- Type: Church
- Style: Churrigueresque
- Groundbreaking: 1573
- Materials: masonry and tezontle

Regina Coeli Convent Church is a Roman Catholic parish church and former convent built in the historic center of Mexico City, on the corner of Regina and Bolivar Streets.

The church building is the only functioning portion of a former 16th century convent. The church is Churrigueresque in style from the 18th century and was part of the convent of Regina Coeli Conceptionist nuns. The former convent was closed during the Reform War and is generally not open to the public. The church is still open to worship and visitors and contains several of its original gilded Churrigueresque altarpieces from the 18th century. One in particular, the altar dedicated to the Virgin of the Fountain is an early, but developed example of the Churrigueresque style. Despite the church’s status as a national monument, it has had serious conservation problems due to deterioration since the mid 20th century.

== History ==
The land was ceded to the Conceptionists in 1573 to establish a convent, with official Vatican permission obtained from Pope Gregory XIII in 1578. It was the second convent of this order established in New Spain. The name of Regina Coeli is derived from a prayer directed to the Virgin Mary during Easter, referring to Mary’s participation in the Resurrection of Jesus . The church portion of the complex dates from 1655. It was repaired several times then consecrated once again in 1731. Nuns from this institution founded other Concepcionista convents in Oaxaca, San Miguel Allende, and others in Mexico City.

The convent operated until 1863, when the Reform Laws closed it down, with the convent building becoming became state property and the church becoming a parish. The government sold it in 1863 to Florencio Velasco del Castillo for 8,000 pesos. However, this transaction was canceled 43 years later by the judiciary. In 1908, the Secretary of the Government (Secretaria de Gobernación) installed a public clock in the building. By 1929, parts of the convent area were being used to raise domestic fowl and pigs with a large quantity of debris in one of the courtyards. It was used as a barracks shortly thereafter and in 1931, was declared an “Artistic Monument.”

In 1982, the complex was declared a Historical Monument of the Nation.

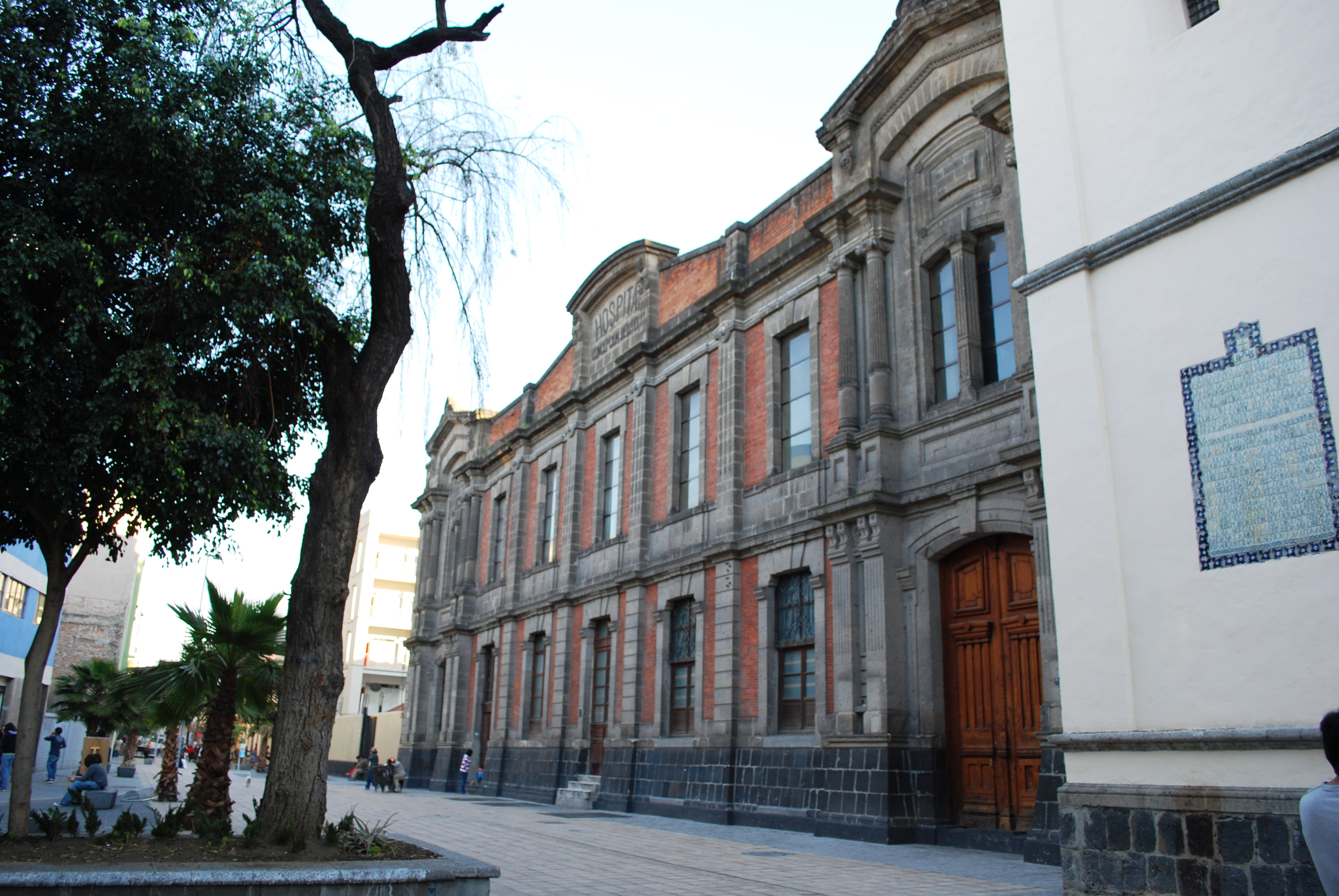
Former convent portion

Starting in the mid 20th century, the deterioration of the church building has been a serious problem. In 1945, a water leak ruined a painting of Saint Christopher. This water seeping prompted remodeling work in 1966, which included of water sealants. However, the building continues to deteriorate, mostly due to humidity in the roof and walls. This causes the crumbling masonry and danger to those paintings directly applied to the building. Recently the arches near the choir area were replaced completely due to the severe damage from time and elements. In 2006, the outer walls facing Regina Street were scraped and painted but not those facing Bolivar Street. More work needs to be done but the city has offered limited funds and the parish has not been able to raise the remainder to seal the walls from further water damage.

The church has suffered robberies of its paintings, mostly during the Reform War and the Cristero War, with a number on the altarpieces now being copies. Other robberies of art objects, money and other items have been much more recent.

The “Fenix Novohispano” National Theater Company performed a work based on the legends associated with the church and its convent called “Historias de vivos, muertos y aparecidos” (Story of the living, dead and appearances). It consists of four works based on different legends, such as "Panes maravillosos" (Marvelous breads), "Delito con su castigo" (Crime with its punishment) y "De la tentación" (Of Temptation), The first tells of a nun of the order who could cure the sick with her bread. The second refers to the story of Don Felizardo Peñalva, who robbed a head of Christ made of gold and was found dead in the church, appearing to have been hanged. The last centers on a friar who is attracted to a voluptuous woman.

Regina Street was revitalized by the city by making it pedestrian only, with all services such as electricity and water provided underground. Stone and brick paving was installed as well as benches, lighting and trees. This work has prompted the revitalization of many of the private buildings on the street as well.

== Description ==
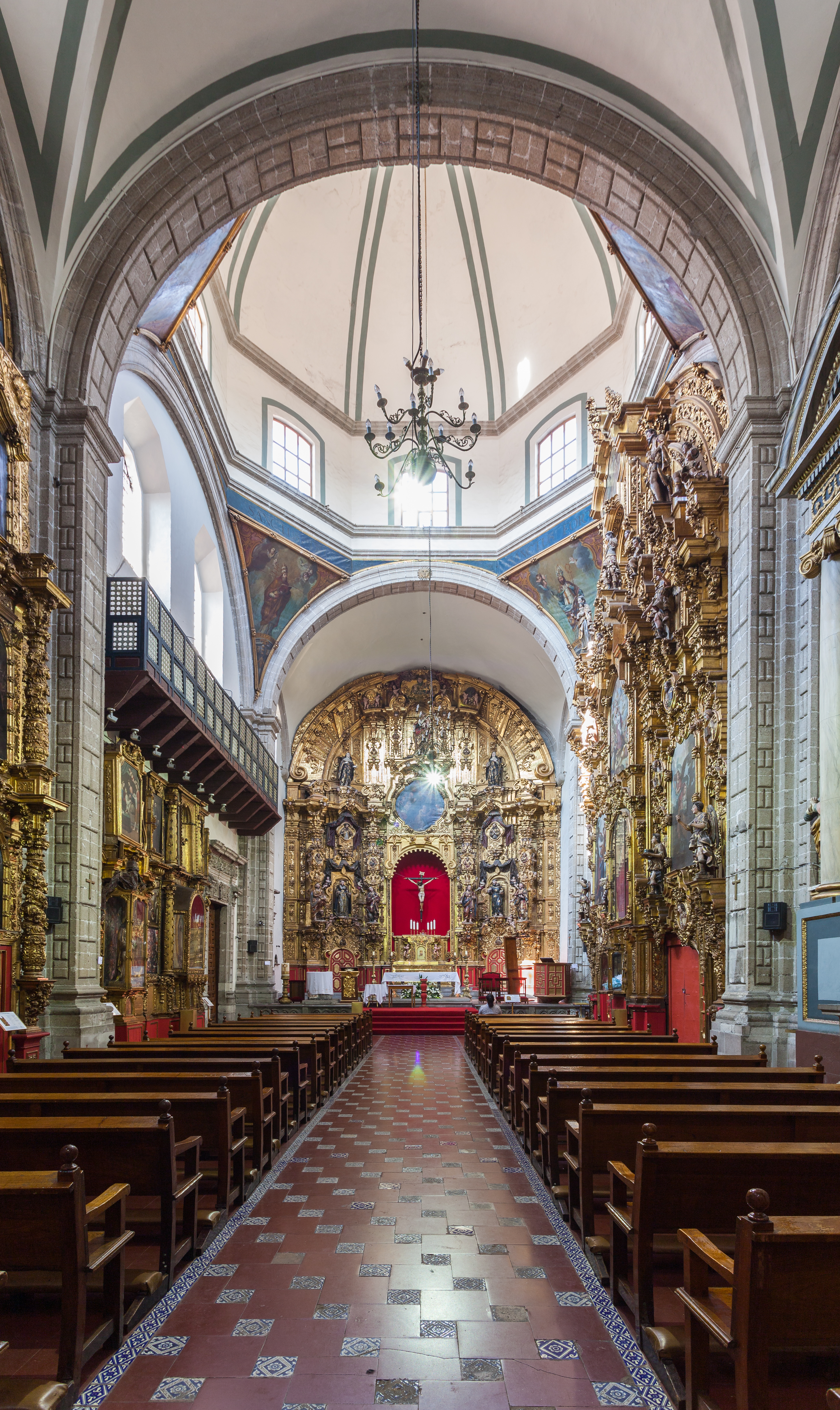
Main nave

The complex was built with masonry, tezontle and other stone. The church portion remains open to worship and visitors, but the former convent area is mostly closed to visitors. Much of the building is dedicated to the Concepción Beistegui Hospital, a senior citizen’s facility. The complex also has a rental hall, a conference hall and a garden with a tile fountain that dates to 1930, as well as 26 gold sconces and many valuable paintings and sculptures. One of the courtyards is called the Patio de la Estampa, which was originally covered. It only conserves one of its arches and parts of others. In 2008, the Sor Juana Salon was inaugurated, dedicated to the Mexican nun from the 17th century . The plaza is located in front of the former convent and church. The plaza contains green areas, benches and a pedestrian corridor. On the opposite side from the church are homes and local businesses.

The facade of the church is simple and has been recently painted. It is marked by a slender bell tower and an octagonal dome. A set of tiles at the foot of the bell tower laid in 1773 marks the 200th anniversary of the convent’s founding. The exterior of the dome is divided into clearly marked segments that are decorated with tiles and pinnacles.

Inside, the nave runs east-west and is covered by a barrel vault. The cupola area is painted with images of Church founders Augustine, Jerome, Gregory and Ambrose. On the west end of the nave is the main altar. Due to its flared form, the main altar area can be described as a niche containing other niches. The main altar is made of wood which has been gilded in pure Churrigueresque style. The figures on the main altar include Anthony of Padua and the Four Evangelists. The smaller interior niches contain images of saints Dominic and Francis of Assisi, who is also depicted on one of the medallions. In the center, there is a canvas showing the birth of the Virgin Mary, and above this, there is a sculpture of Saint Joseph. The main altar is framed by slender inverted truncated pyramid (estipite) pilasters. One particularly important niche is gilded, decorated with mirrors, tortoise shell and mother-of-pearl. It contains a sculpture of the Immaculate Conception dating from the 19th century. Far above the altar, there is a depiction of God the Father holding the world in his hands.

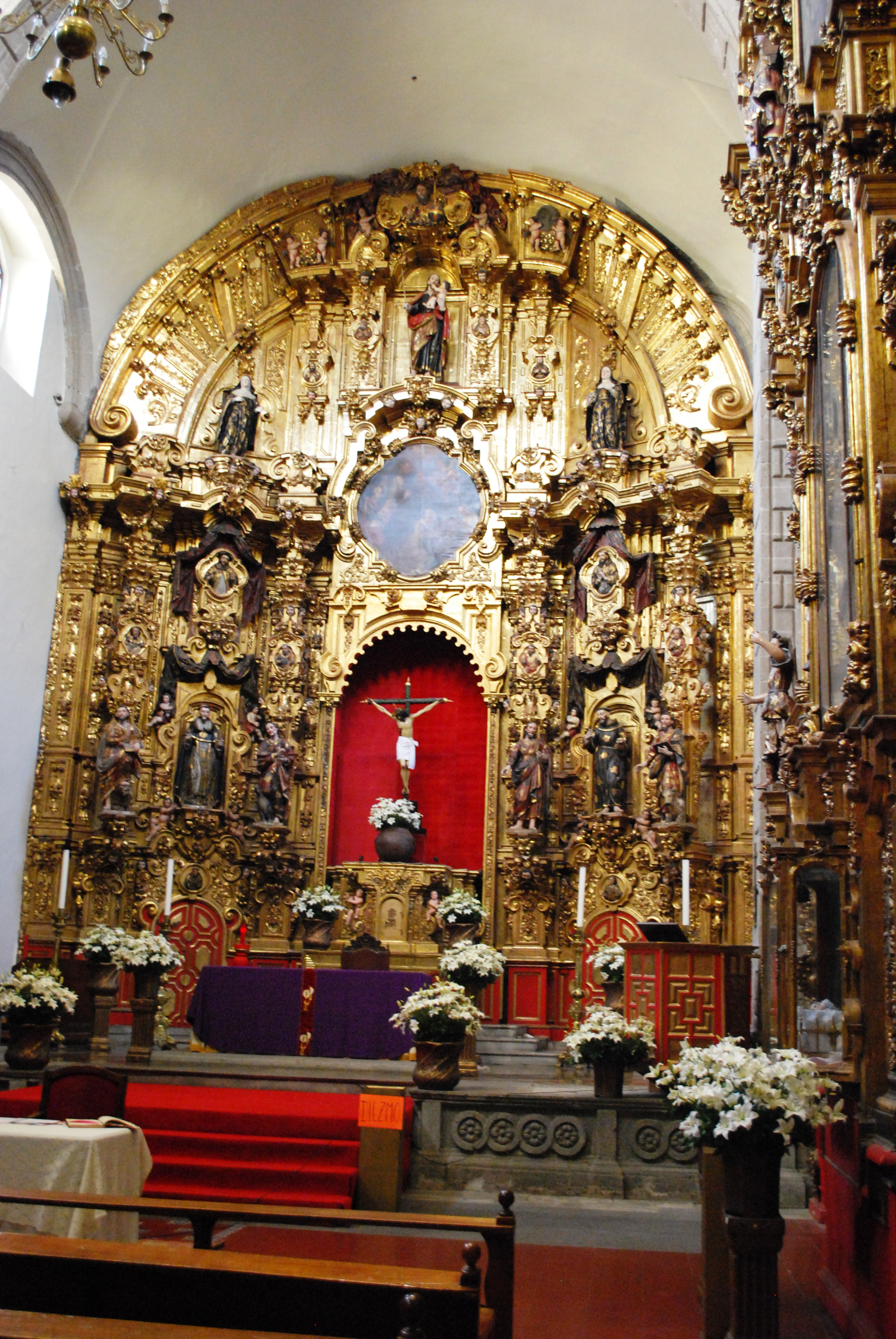
Main altar

In addition to the main altar, several original side altarpieces remain. Two of the side altars, located side-by-side are dedicated to the Calvary and to the Sacred Heart and decorated with eight Salomonic columns adorned with leaves and racemes. These columns flank paintings and two niches. One of these niches contains a well carved depiction of Calvary set against a polychromatic background. The altarpiece of the Virgin of the Fountain was done by Felipe de Ureña, who was instrumental in the application of the Baroque style to Mexican churches, especially those along the silver routes north of Mexico City. He was commissioned to create this work in 1738 soon after the church had been expanded and remodeled by Miguel Custodio Duràn. The altarpiece is an example of early Baroque or Mexican Churrigueresque style, using estipite (inverted truncated pyramid) pilasters and decorative niches. The latter feature often leads scholars to give the piece a later date. The pose of the Virgin in the painting is static and folkloric and contrasts with the ornate geometry and animated statues of archangels. It is attributed to José de Ibarra .

Other features of the interior of the main nave are interior pediments with black and gold mouldings and are decorated with paintings which are possibly done by Nicolás Rodríguez Juárez . The church also contains nine life-sized sculptures in wood, as well as other altars in Neoclassical and Plateresque styles.

Over the main door is an enormous canvas of Saint Christopher and opposite this, next to the altarpiece dedicated to Francis of Assisi, is a doorway leading to the Medina Picazo Chapel, the work of architect Miguel Custodio Durán, which dates from 1733. This chapel began as the cell, or living quarters, of the daughter of colonial doctor Pedro López after she took her vows to become a nun. After her death, her brother had the cell restored and transformed into the current chapel. The entrance of this chapel is made of sculpted sandstone and was once golden, looking like an altarpiece flanked by somewhat flame, flame-shaped Salomonic columns. The undulations of the columns are repeated in the pinnacles above, which are topped by a crest bearing images of the sun and moon. The sun represents Christ and the moon represents the Virgin, who reflects the light of her son. The central section of the entrance is dedicated to a sculpture of the Immaculate Conception, above which there is a dove representing the Holy Spirit and a cross. The doors have a wooden grate that has been elaborately carved with Franciscan coats of arms and other decorative items. Inside the chapel, there are oils here done by Villalobos. These include the Visitación de María, Los Esponsales de José y María, La Adoración de los Pastores, Anunciación and La Adoración de los Reyes. To the right of the presbytery, there is a realistic sculpture of the chapel's benefactor, Father Buenaventura de Medina Picazo.

The upper choir area has a rectangular iron railing and also has the appearance of an altarpiece. Acanthus leaves are used to form the fretwork containing a series of medallions bearing the anagrams of the "Five Persons": Jesus, Mary, Joseph and Mary's parents Joaquín and Ana. The railing is surrounded by moulding that appears to thread through the fretwork. Originally this work was red and gold but the red has turned gray over time. Inside the choir, there are eight paintings by Pueblan artist Francisco Antonio Vallejo.

== See also ==
- List of colonial churches in Mexico City
