= Santa Maria Regina Coeli =

Church building in Naples, Italy

Church of Santa Maria Regina Coeli
- Chiesa di Santa Maria Regina Coeli
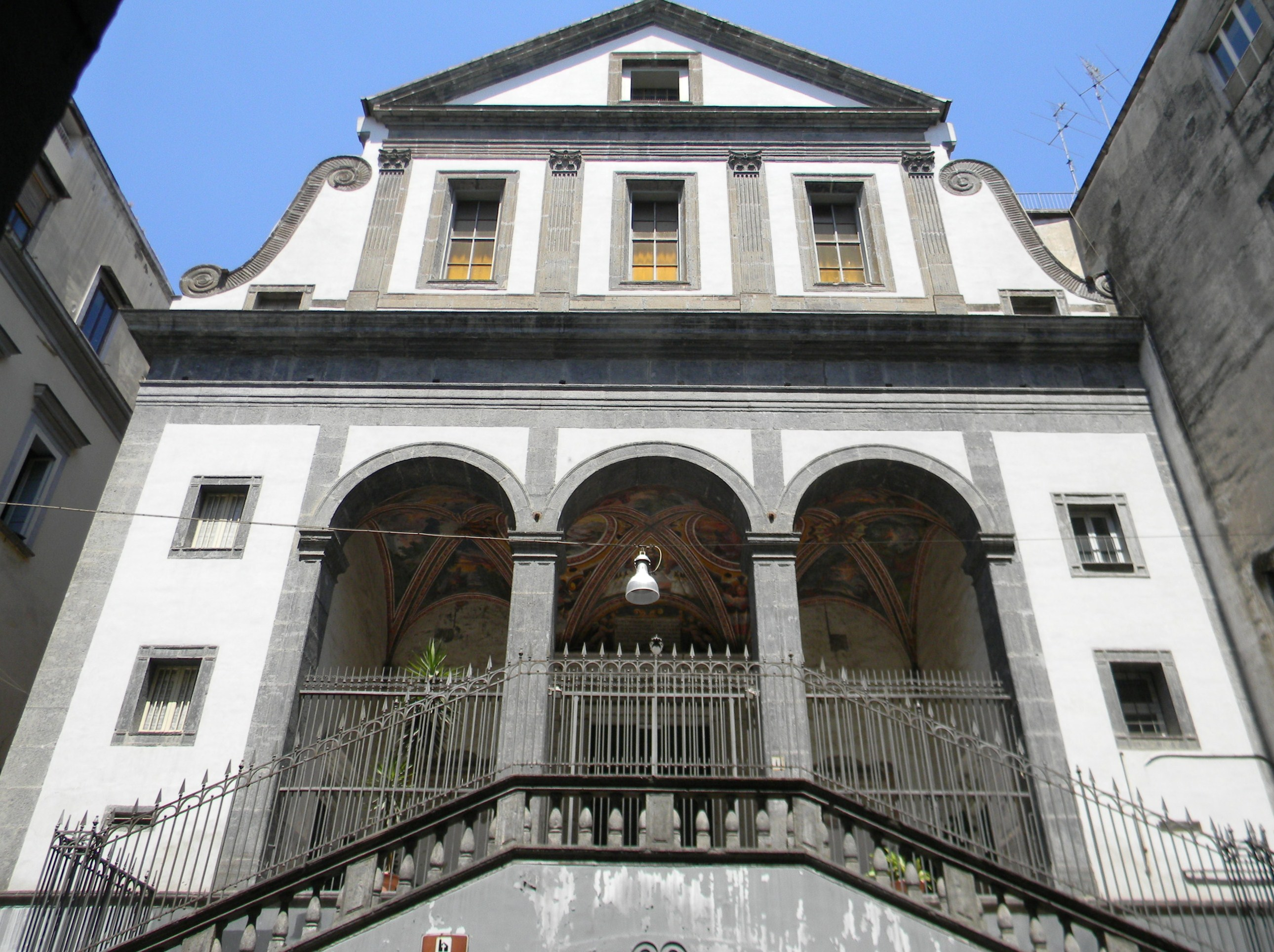
- The facade of Santa Maria Regina Coeli in Naples .
- Church of Santa Maria Regina Coeli
- 40.852194°N 14.254270°E
- Location: Naples; Province of Naples, Campania
- Country: Italy
- Denomination: Roman Catholic

History
- Status: Active

Architecture
- Architectural type: Church
- Style: Baroque architecture, Renaissance architecture

Administration
- Diocese: Roman Catholic Archdiocese of Naples

Santa Maria Regina Coeli ('Saint Mary the Queen of Heaven') is a Roman Catholic church in central Naples, Italy.

== History ==
After the earthquake of 1561 damaged their original house in Naples, nuns from the order of the Canonesses Regular of the Lateran (female branch of the Canons Regular of the Lateran) moved to the Palazzo Montalto, adjacent to the monastery of San Gaudioso. Here they made a new convent dedicated the Holy Mary, Queen of Heaven (Regina Coeli). The present church was built by 1594 under the direction of Luciano Quaranta. The building was reconstructed by Giovanni Vincenzo Della Monica, then later by Giovanni Francesco di Palma; and finally by Francesco Antonio Picchiatti in 1682. In 1812, the nuns were transferred to the Monastery of Gesù e Maria and in their place moved in the Sisters of Charity of Saint Jeanne-Antide Thouret. This order still owns the complex in 2014.

The entrance is preceded by two staircases leading to a pronaos with arcades, which was frescoed (1594) by the Flemish painter Loise Croys, pupil of Paul Bril. To the right of the sacristy, rises an octagonal bell-tower next to Via Pisanelli.

The interior has decoration from the 18th century. The wooden ceiling was designed by Pietro De Marino, and holds canvases by Stanzione; By the windows are painting by Luca Giordano, Micco Spadaro, Giovan Battista Beinaschi, and Pietro del Pò. The apse has a dome, stuccoed in 1683, while the altar was completed in the 17th century by Giovanni Mozzetta. The walls have frescoes by Pietro Bardellino. Other frescoes in the church are by Lorenzo Vaccaro. In the fourth chapel is a painting by Giordano, and in the sacristy hangs a Pietà by Filippo Vitale.

== The cloister ==
The cloister has a bust of San Vincenzo de' Paoli and by Santa Giovanna Antida Thouret. Reconstructions were carried out in 1599, and further work in the convent occurred in the second half of the 17th century by the architect Francesco Antonio Picchiatti.

== See also ==
- 16th-century Western domes
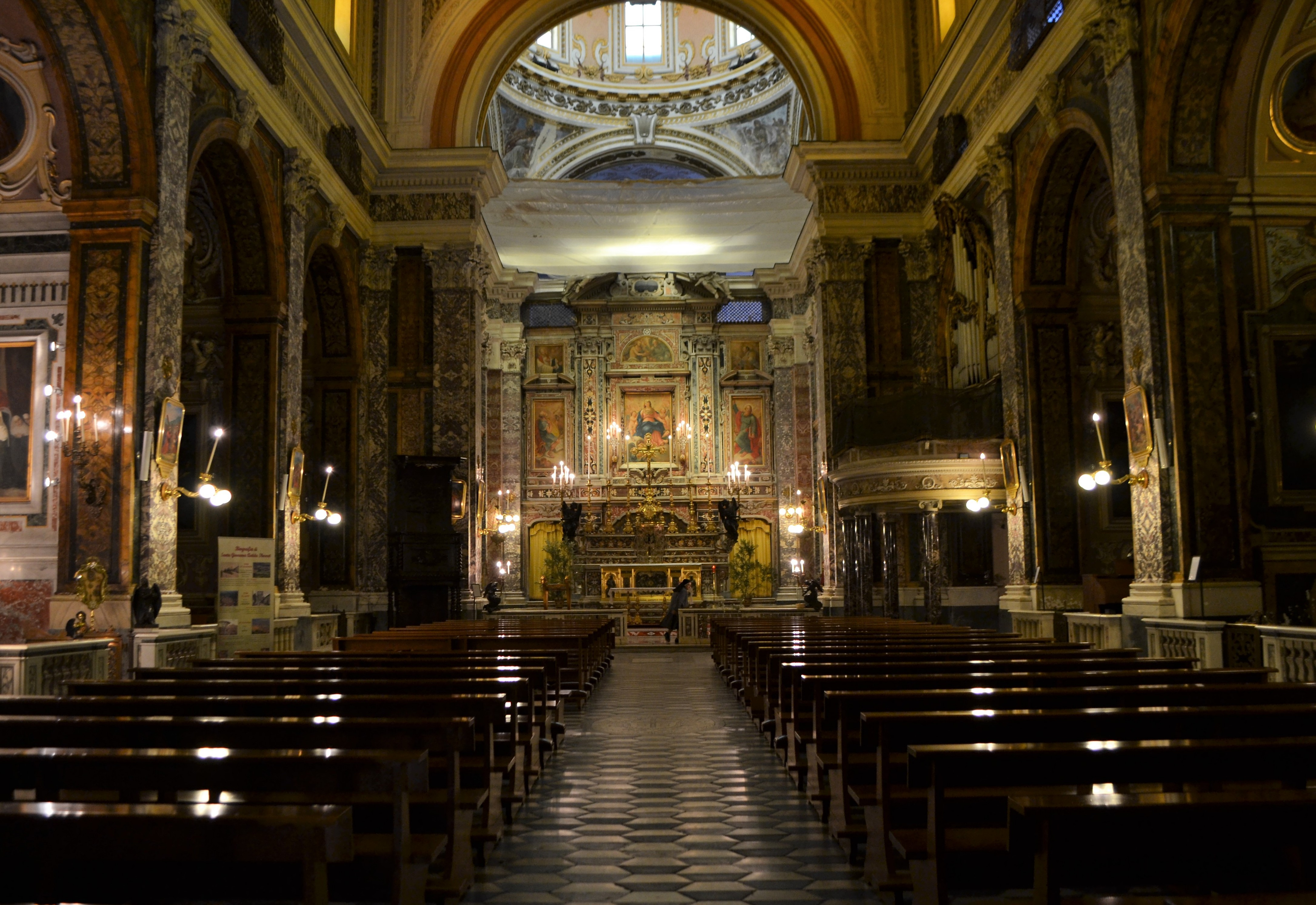
Nave

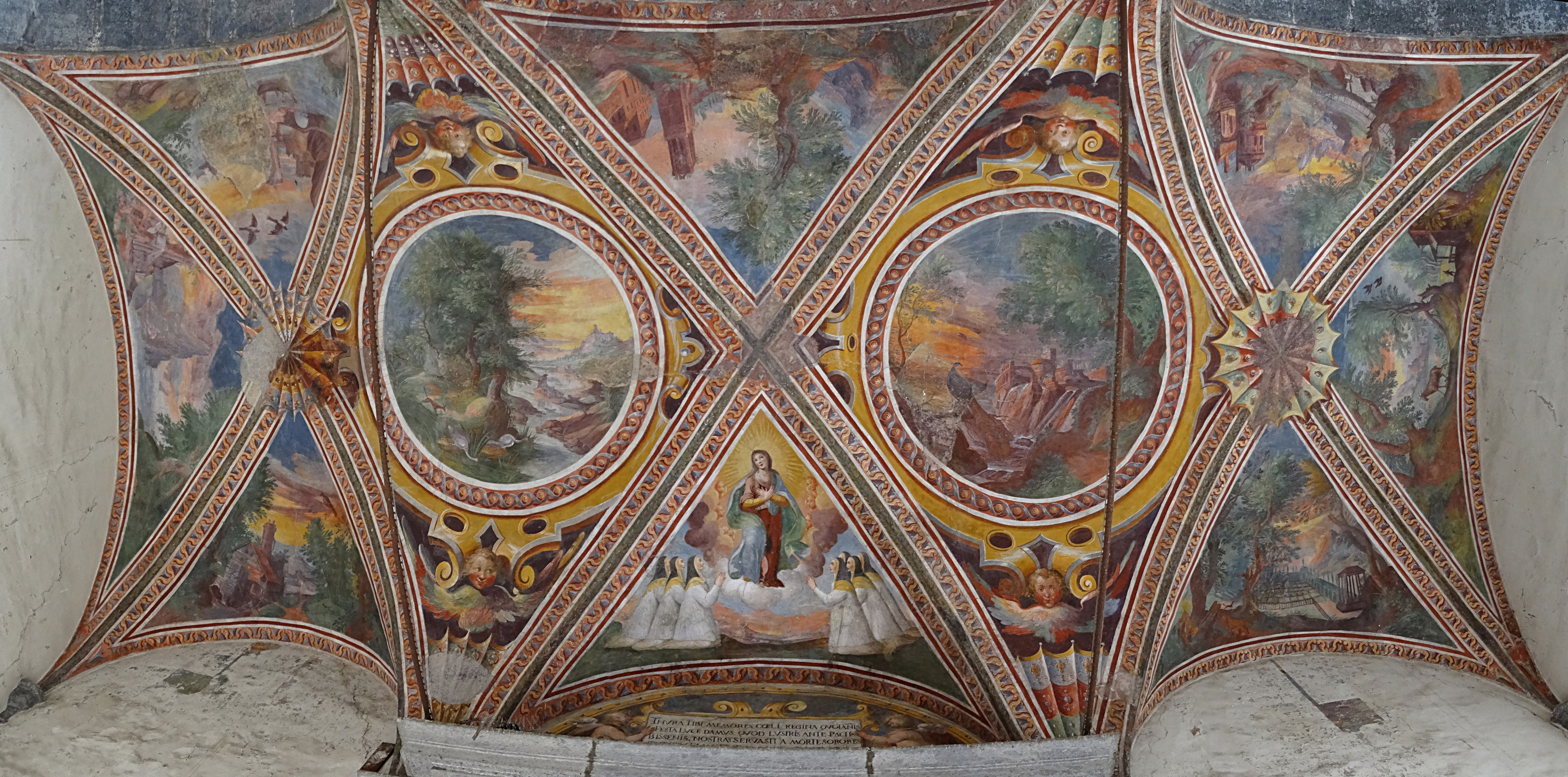
Ceiling frescoes at the entrance

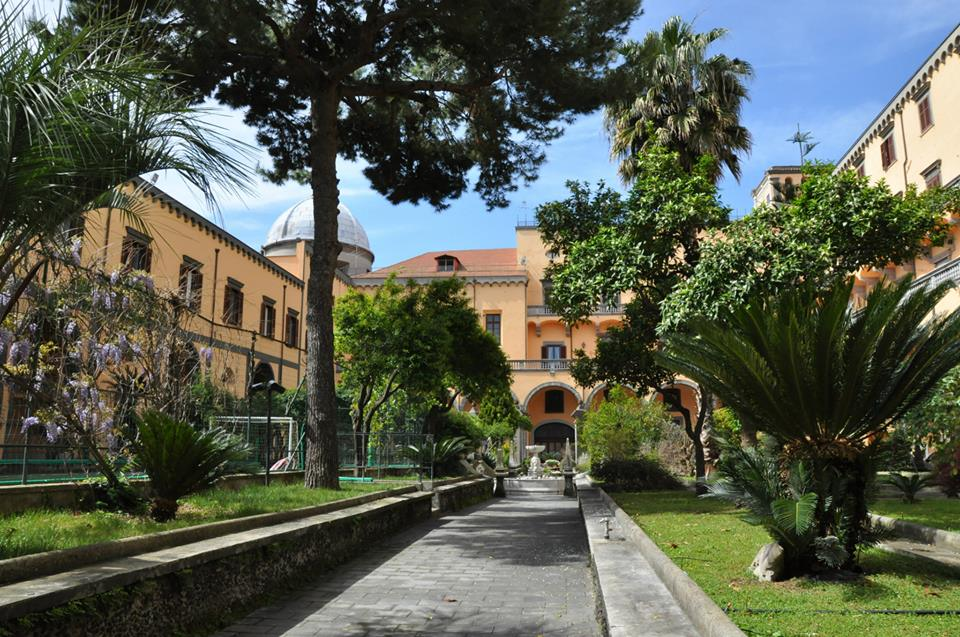
The cloister

== Bibliography ==
- Maria Rosaria Costa, I Chiostri di Napoli, Editor, Tascabili Newton.
- Napoli sacra. Guida alle chiese della città, coordinamento scientifico di Nicola Spinosa; curated by Gemma Cautela, Leonardo Di Mauro, Renato Ruotolo, Naples 1993–1997.
