= Santa Maria di Montesanto, Naples =

Church of Santa Maria di Montesanto
- Chiesa di Santa Maria di Montesanto
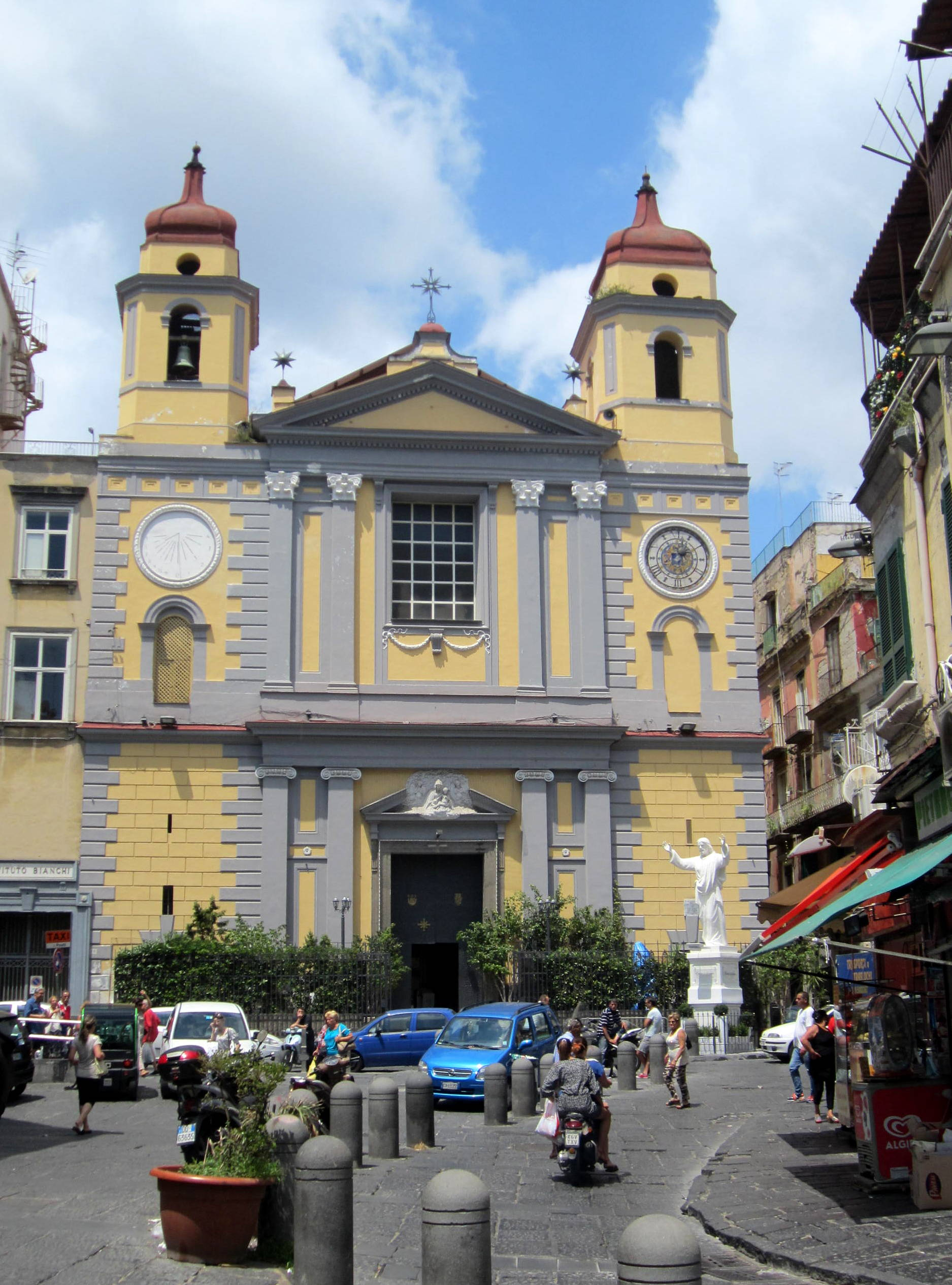
- The façade of church.
- Church of Santa Maria di Montesanto
- 40.847696°N 14.245488°E
- Location: Naples; Province of Naples, Campania
- Country: Italy
- Denomination: Roman Catholic

History
- Status: Active

Architecture
- Architectural type: Church
- Style: Baroque architecture

Administration
- Diocese: Roman Catholic Archdiocese of Naples

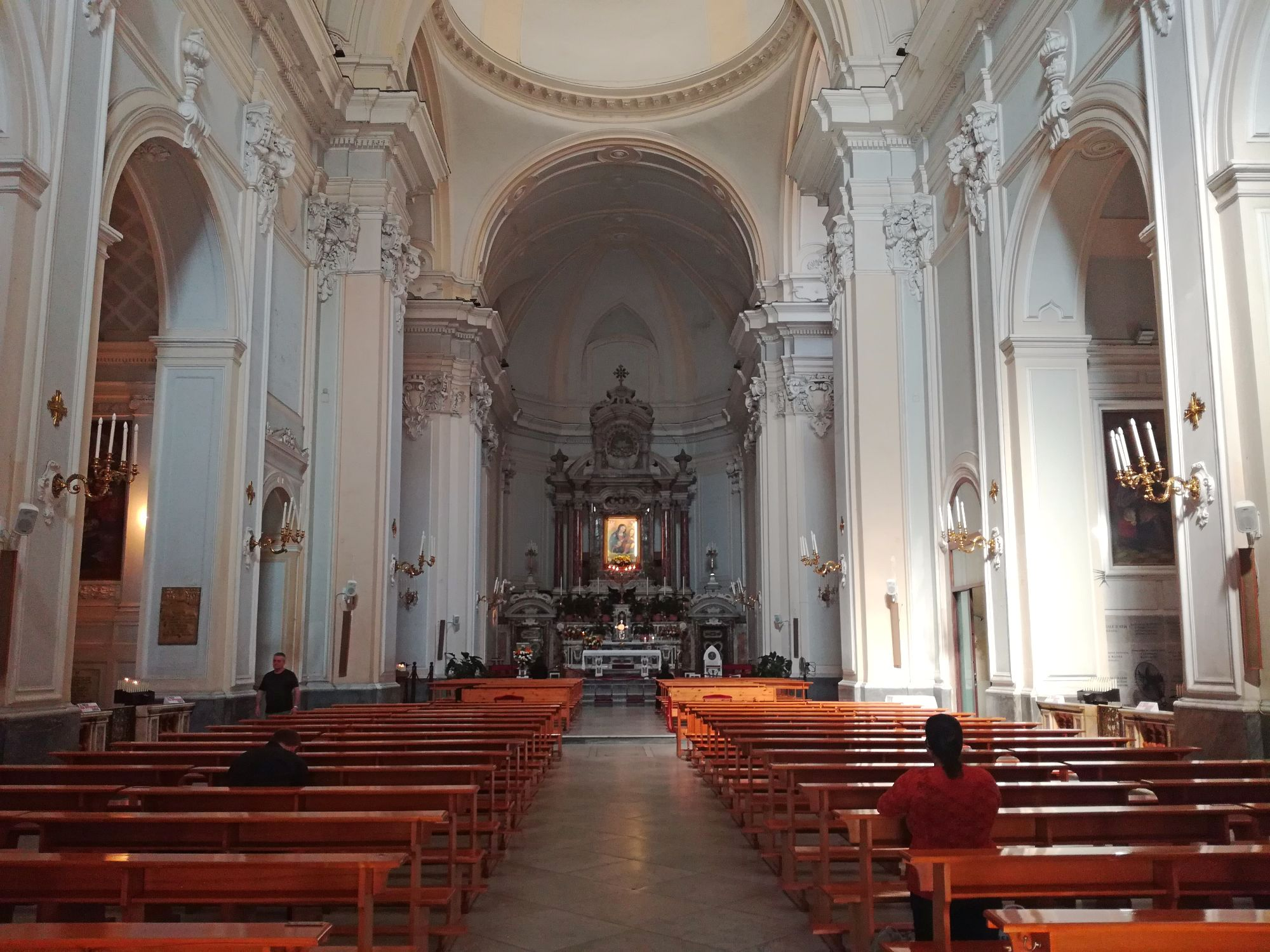
Interior

The church of Santa Maria di Montesanto and the annexed monastery were built in Naples, Italy, by a community of Carmelite friars that had its origins in Montesanto, Sicily.

The initial architect was Pietro De Marino, but the work including the cupola (1680) was completed by Dionisio Lazzari. The facades, done in the 19th century by Angelo Viva, depict Our Lady of Carmel (the Madonna del Carmelo).

The interior is on a Latin-cross plan. In the first two chapels are canvases by Paolo De Matteis, depicting St Michael Archangel and the Miracle of St Anthony (1693). In one arm of the transept is the Crucifixion with Madonna and St John the Baptist, an 18th-century wood sculpture by Nicola Fumo. An interior chapel, dedicated to Saint Cecilia, was patronized by the musicians from the Real Cappella Palatina.

The church houses the tomb of the composer Alessandro Scarlatti, who died in 1725, the altar surmounted by a painting of Giuseppe Simonelli which depicts Saint Cecilia.

== Bibliography ==
- Vincenzo Regina, Le chiese di Napoli. Viaggio indimenticabile attraverso la storia artistica, architettonica, letteraria, civile e spirituale della Napoli sacra, Newton e Compton, editor, Naples (2004).
