= Tricarico Cathedral =

Cathedral in Tricarico, Italy

Coordinates: 40°37′25″N 16°8′29″E

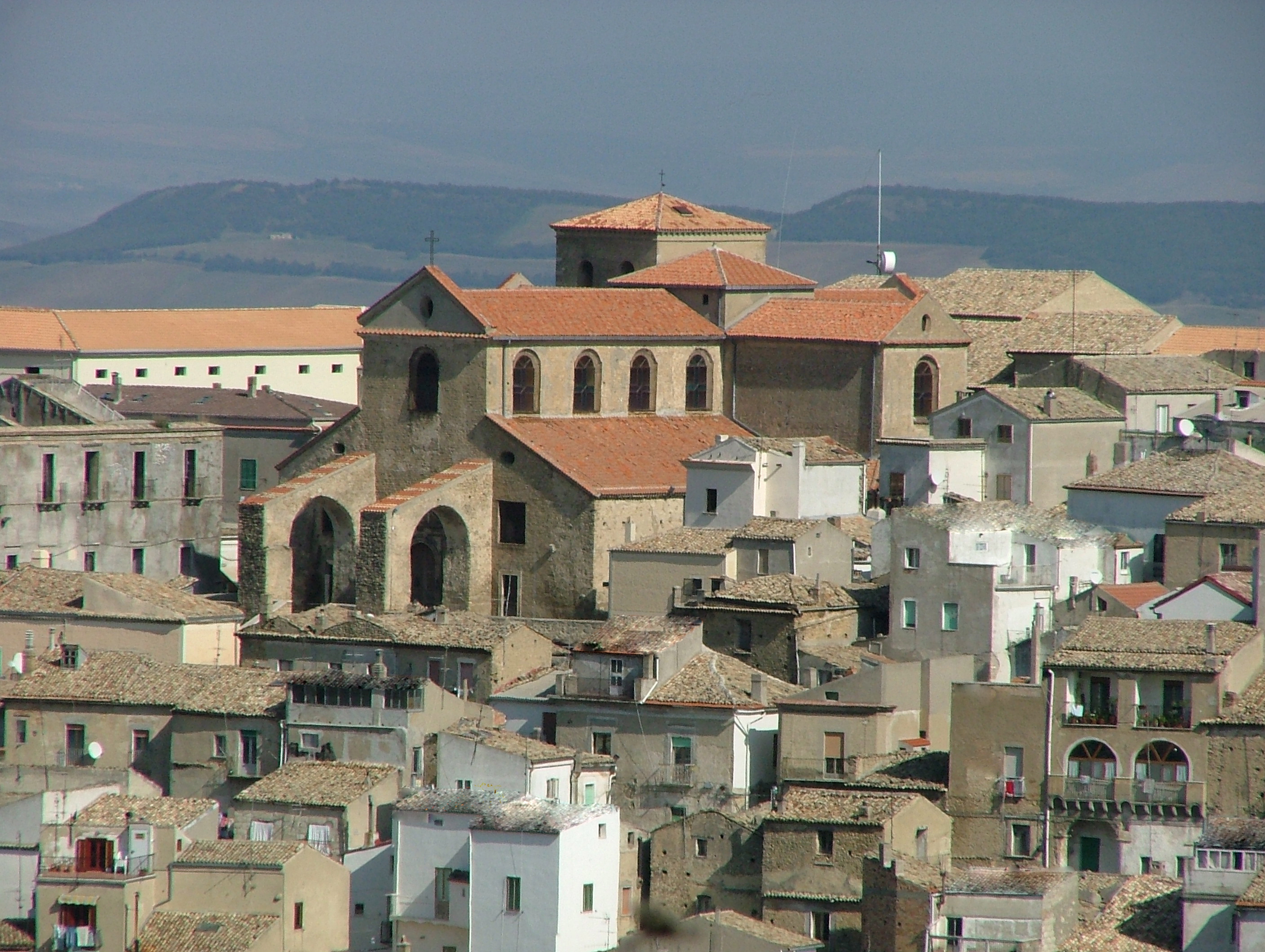

Tricarico Cathedral is a Roman Catholic cathedral church in the city of Tricarico. It is the centre of the Diocese of Tricarico. The city is first recorded as having a bishop in 968. Robert Guiscard erected the present building in the Romanesque style in the 11th century using a gift from his nephew Robert, Count of Montescaglioso. Louis I, Duke of Anjou was crowned there in 1383.
