= San Potito Sannitico =

- Comune
- Comune di San Potito Sannitico
- Coat of arms

- Location within Italy Location within Campania
- Coordinates: 41°20′N 14°24′E
- Country: Italy
- Region: Campania
- Province: Caserta (CE)

Government
  - Mayor: Francesco Imperadore

Area
  - Total: 22.8 km^{2} (8.8 sq mi)
- Elevation: 235 m (771 ft)

Population (31 March 2017)
  - Total: 1,922
  - Density: 84.3/km^{2} (218/sq mi)
- Demonym: Potitesi
- Time zone: UTC+1 (CET)
  - Summer (DST): UTC+2 (CEST)
- Postal code: 81016
- Dialing code: 0823
- Website: Official website

San Potito Sannitico is a comune (municipality) in the Province of Caserta in the Italian region Campania, located about 60 kilometres (37 mi) north of Naples and about 30 kilometres (19 mi) north of Caserta.

== History ==
During World War II, it escaped damage from bombing or ground fighting: it had been used as a mustering base for the British 2nd Battalion Coldstream Guards, who were joined there on 28 March 1944 by 'S' Company Scots Guards. These units were in the town of Cassino when the German army withdrew on 17–18 May. In the battle of Monte Piccolo on 27 May 1944, 'S' Company and the 2nd Coldstreams suffered heavy casualties clearing the defending 14 Kompanie, 4th Regiment of the German 1st Parachute Division from the hill so that Route 6 could be opened up for the advance on Rome.
