= Santa Maria delle Grazie a Mondragone =

Church in Naples, Italy

Coordinates: 40.8382°N 14.2424°E

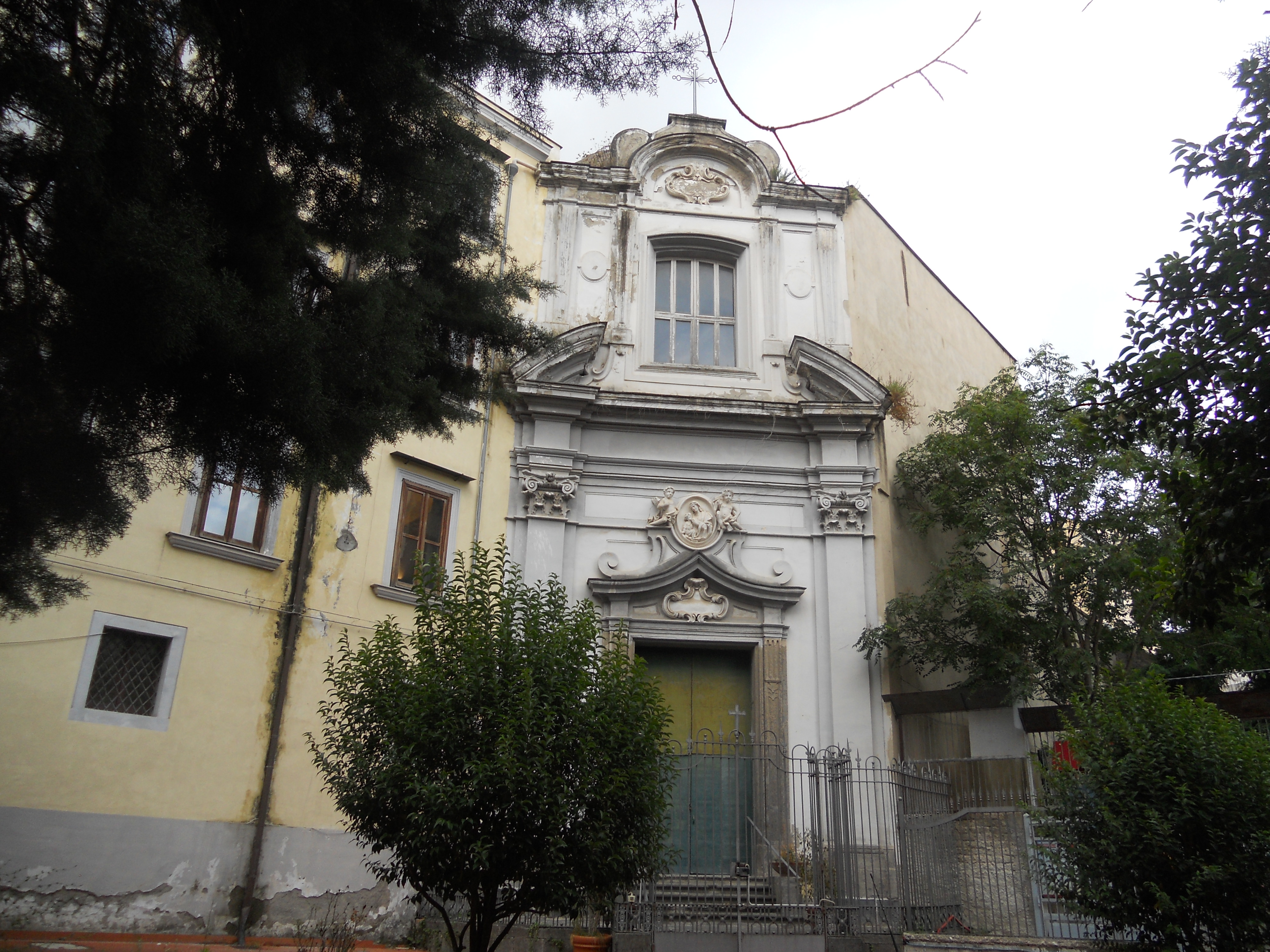
facade of Santa Maria delle Grazie

Santa Maria delle Grazie a Mondragone is a small now-deconsecrated Roman Catholic church building on Piazzeta Mondragone in central Naples, Italy.

== History ==
In 1653, a church and an adjacent retirement home for noble widows, were commissioned here by Princess Elena Aldobrandini (1580-1663), wife of Duke of Mondragone. The buildings were damaged during the earthquake of 1688 and 1732, and various reconstructions followed, using plans by Arcangelo Guglielmelli (1648-1723), who received his commission in 1715. Guglielmelli is known for his centralized design of the church of Santa Maria del Rosario alle Pigne near Piazza Cavour in central Naples. The work was completed, including interior decoration by Giovanni Battista Nauclerio (1666-1739) after Guglielmelli's death.

The church is now part of the Fondazione Mondragone, that operates a textile and fashion museum and a school.

== Interior ==
The stucco work was performed by Giuseppe Scarola. The silverware for the altars were completed by Felice Cioffi in 1735 - 1738. The pavement in tile and maiolica was designed by Nauclerio. In 1743, the prioress of the Hospice, Anna Sanfelice, commissioned a polychrome marble altar designed by Ferdinando Sanfelice, and completed by Giuseppe Astarita. The altarpiece of the Madonna delle Grazie was painted by Giuseppe Marullo; he also painted a Ste Rosa and a Vision of Ste Candida for the church. The tabernacle and balustrade of the presbytery were completed in 1790 by Gennaro Sammartino.

The original chapel at the site remains in part as the sacristy, with an altarpiece depicting the Triumph of Faith.
