= Guglielmetti =

Guglielmetti is an Italian surname. Notable people with the surname include:

- Matthew Guglielmetti (born 1949), American mobster
- Savino Guglielmetti (1911–2006), Italian gymnast

== See also ==
- Guglielmelli
