= Francis Xavier Bianchi =

18th and 19th-century Italian Barnabite priest and saint

Saint Francis Xavier Bianchi CRSP
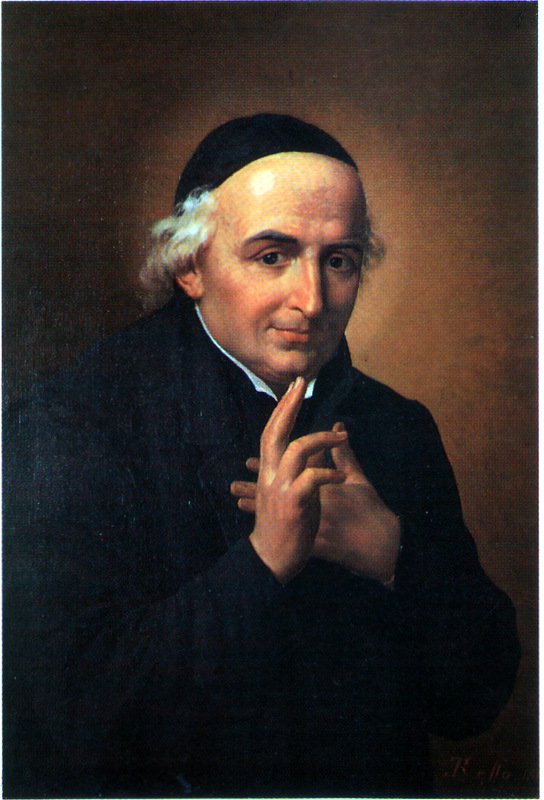
- Apostle of Naples
- Born: December 2, 1743; Arpino, Lazio, Papal States
- Died: January 31, 1815 (aged 71); Naples
- Venerated in: Roman Catholicism (Barnabite Order and the Archdiocese of Naples)
- Beatified: February 22, 1893, Rome by Pope Leo XIII
- Canonized: October 21, 1951, Rome by Pope Pius XII
- Major shrine: Church of Santa Maria di Caravaggio, Naples
- Feast: 31 January

Francis Xavier Mary Bianchi (Italian: Francesco Saverio Maria Bianchi; /biːˈɑːŋki/) (December 2, 1743 – January 31, 1815), was an Italian Barnabite priest and noted scholar, who also gained a reputation for sanctity during his lifetime from both his commitment to his students and to the poor of Naples. He has been proclaimed a saint by the Catholic Church and declared the Apostle of the city.

== Life ==
=== Early life ===
Bianchi was born in 1743 in Arpino in the Lazio region, then part of the Papal States, into a loving and pious family. His mother taught him to care for the poor around them, giving him example by setting up a small clinic in the family home where she would nurse up to 16 needy people. He was, nevertheless, far from a standard pious child. He would later confess to how he would occasionally pilfer money from his parents.

What changed Bianchi's life was a slow and steady resolve to conquer his own will. As he grew older, he felt that he might have a religious calling. Despite their own faith, his parents initially opposed that step. As a result, at the age of 15 he was enrolled in a minor seminary in Nola, while at the same time, he began the study of law at the University of Naples Federico II. During this period, he came under the spiritual guidance of Alphonsus de Ligouri, the founder of the Redemptorists. By the time he had completed the seminary in 1762, his parents had relented in their opposition to his following a career in the Church.

=== Barnabite ===
Bianchi was admitted by the Barnabite Order into their novitiate in Zagarolo that same year, professing religious vows as a member of the Order the following year. He was then sent to pursue his study of philosophy and theology, first at Macerata, followed by Rome and Naples, where he was ordained a priest in 1767. Prior to his ordination he had taught at the Barnabite college in his hometown. He was immediately appointed the Superior of the College of Santa Maria in Cosmedin in Portanova, which office he filled for 12 years.

His superiors then assigned Bianchi to the Barnabite monastery attached to the Church of Santa Maria di Caravaggio, Naples, where he was to spend the rest of his life. In 1778 he was appointed a professor at Regia University (now the University of Palermo), as well as a member of the Royal Academy of Science and Letters of the Pontifical Ecclesiastical Academy. Despite his academic honors and pride of place in the Order, his fellow Barnabites also saw another side to him, as he became known among them for the deeply ascetic way of life he followed, with a deeply contemplative prayer life, and for his constant concern for the poor of the cities where he lived.

Bianchi became part of a circle of notable religious figures living in Naples in that era. He became the spiritual director and confessor of Mary Frances of the Five Wounds, a Franciscan tertiary, who lived in one of the most crime-ridden neighborhoods of the city, and is now also honored as a saint. In turn, he came spiritual friends and under the guidance of such figures as Placido Baccher, Mariano Arciero, his fellow Barnabite and student Francesco Maria Castelli, Giovanni Battista Jossa, and Agnello Coppola. He was in frequent communication with Vincent Romano as well as with King Charles Emmanuel IV of Sardinia and his niece, Princess Maria Clotilde of Savoy, then in exile in Naples.

Bianchi's life changed in 1800, when he fell into a state of religious ecstasy while praying before the exposed Blessed Sacrament on Pentecost of that year. Shortly after this, he developed an illness which left his legs twisted and with open sores for the rest of his life. During the last three years of his life, he continued to preside daily at Mass, despite the agony of having to stand. Mostly bedridden, he used this time to deep his spiritual life even further.

Bianchi also begun to tremble and experiences huge palpitations of his heart whenever he prayed, in a manner similar to that which had been experienced by St. Philip Neri two centuries earlier. The tertiary Mary Frances commented that we have two Philip's, one white and one black, which was a pun on the meanings of their family names in Italian.

Bianchi was still living in the Barnabite monastery of Naples when it was closed in 1809, as part of the suppression of all monasteries and religious houses under the Napoleonic Kingdom of Naples. He was able to remain in the city, where he died in 1815.

== Veneration ==
Bianchi was beatified on January 22, 1893, by Pope Leo XIII, who also declared him to be the "Apostle of Naples". He was later canonized on October 21, 1951, by Pope Pius XII. His remains are enshrined in the Church of Santa Maria di Caravaggio in Naples. His feast day is celebrated on January 30 by the Barnabites and the Catholic Church in Naples.
