= Santa Maria dell'Aiuto =

Church in Naples, Italy

Coordinates: 40.844407°N 14.253988°E

Santa Maria dell'Aiuto or Holy Mary of Succour is a Baroque-style church, located at Vico S Maria dell'Aiuto number 10, near the church of Santa Maria la Nova in Naples, Italy.

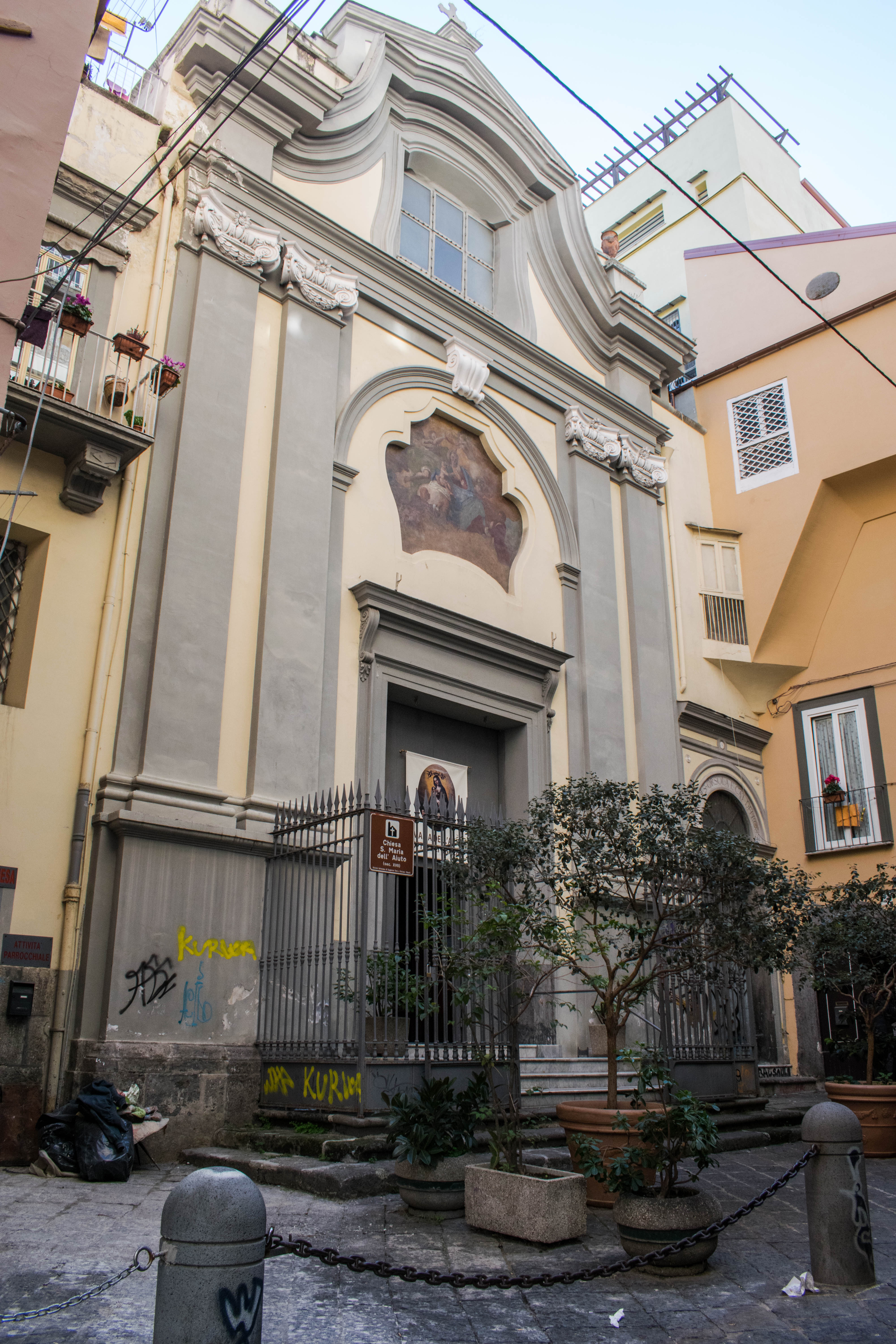
Facade

== History ==
Legend holds that the origins are of the church were in 1635, when two now anonymous children of the laborers of the quartiere, posted their juvenile image of the Madonna and child. Gaining donations, they commissioned the image now in the main altar. The devotion to this image of the Madonna rose during the plague year of 1656, and further donations allowed the church to be built. The designs of Dionisio Lazzari led to completion and consecration of the church in 1673. The miracles and intercessions by the Madonna are registered in a book kept in the parochial archive, plus evident in the numerous votive marble plaques in the church.

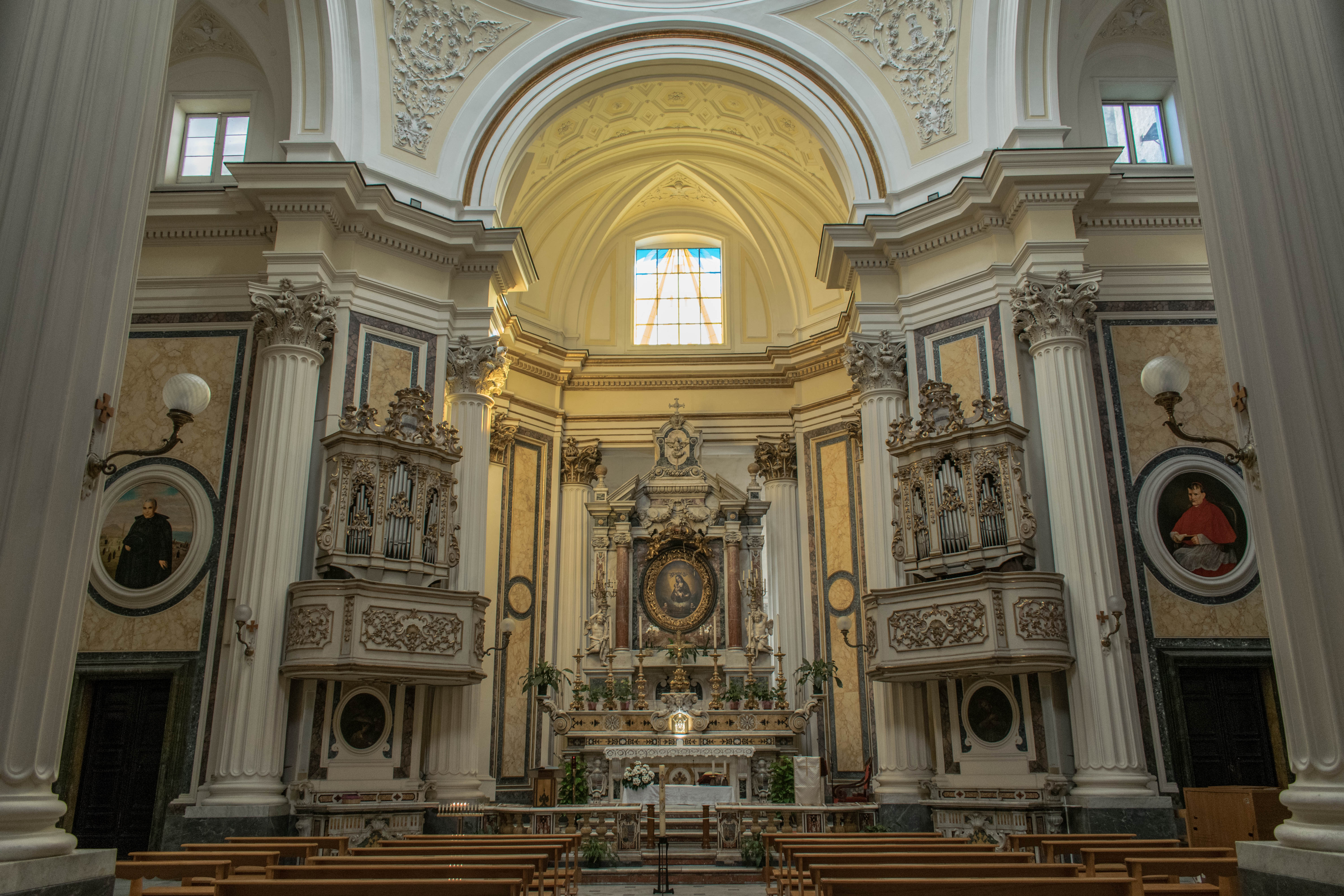
Interior

The church facade has a tall narrow scroll decoration, the interior follows a Greek cross plan with a central dome. It has undergone various restorations; the most recent was in 1983, after the earthquake of 1980.

The church entrance has a number of works of art by the artist Gaspare Traversi, who is best known for his genre paintings. He painted a Birth of Mary, an Annuciation, and "Assumption of the Virgin". The painting of the Archangel Saint Michael is attributed to Giacinto Diano. The architect Lazzari designed the main altar, the interior balustrades, and the base of the funereal monument for Gennaro Acampora, rector of the church. The revered icon on the main altar is anonymous. The amphora of the prior monument and the flanking angels holding the candelabra were sculpted by Francesco Pagano. A painting of The Virgin of Succour is by Giuseppe Farina; while the Flight of Joseph is by Nicola Malinconico A later Neoclassic style monument from the early 20th century is the funereal monument for Francesco di Gennaro, rector of the church from 1889 to 1907.
