= Santi Bernardo e Margherita a Fonseca =

Building in Naples, Italy

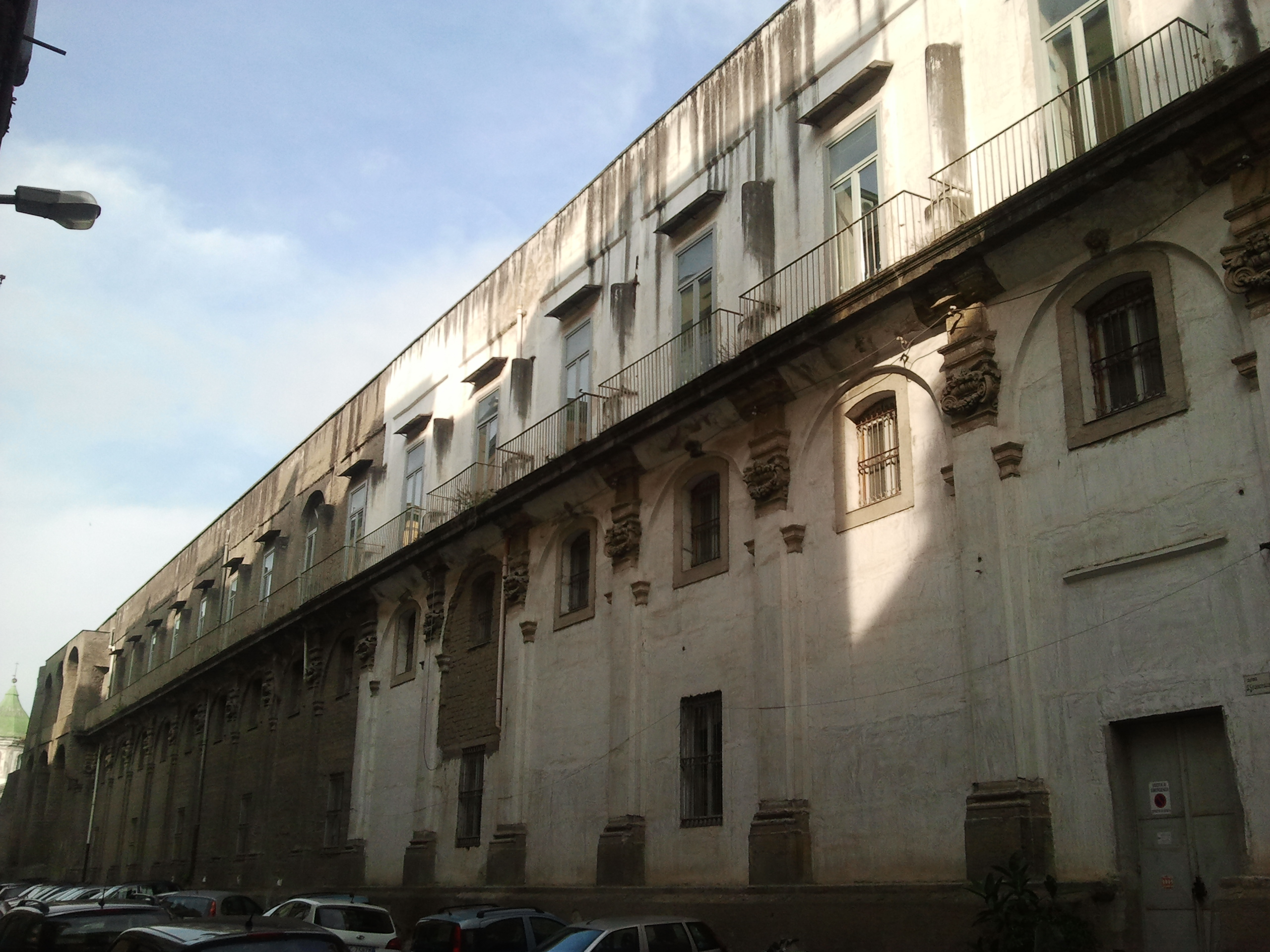
the wall of the monastery

Santi Bernardo e Margherita a Fonseca is a former Roman Catholic church and convent located on Via San Giuseppe dei Nudi and Vico San Margherita a Fonseca, adjacent to the deconsecrated convent of the Santissimo Sacramento in the quartiere of Stella of Naples, Italy.

== History ==
The church was built in 1634, and was acquired by the nuns from the adjacent convent. The structure underwent refurbishment in the early 18th century. The church was restructured between 1725 and 1732 by Giovanni Battista Nauclerio.

After the suppression of the religious orders in 1809, the convent was used as a jail. In 1820, it was given to the Archconfraternity della Vita. In 1859, it was conceded to the Order of Knights Hospitaller, who now maintain a hospital at the convent. The interiors still retain some of the late-Baroque architecture decoration, including stucco-work.
