= Santa Maria di Caravaggio =

Catholic church in Naples, Italy

Coordinates: 40.850066°N 14.249632°E

The Church of Santa Maria di Caravaggio is a Baroque Catholic church located on Piazza Dante, in Naples, Italy.

Construction was begun in 1627 under the patronage of Felice Pignella, and dedicated to the Holy Mary of Caravaggio, a small town in the Province of Bergamo. This attribution of Mary recalls an apparition of the Virgin in 1432. The church was first attached to the Piarists, a religious order dedicated to teaching, and later to the Barnabites. In 1873, it became property of the Prince of Naples Institute for Blind Children (Italian: Instituto Principe di Napoli per giovani non vedenti). The architect who helped complete the work was Giovan Battista Nauclerio. The dome was restored in 1846 by Michele Stellati.

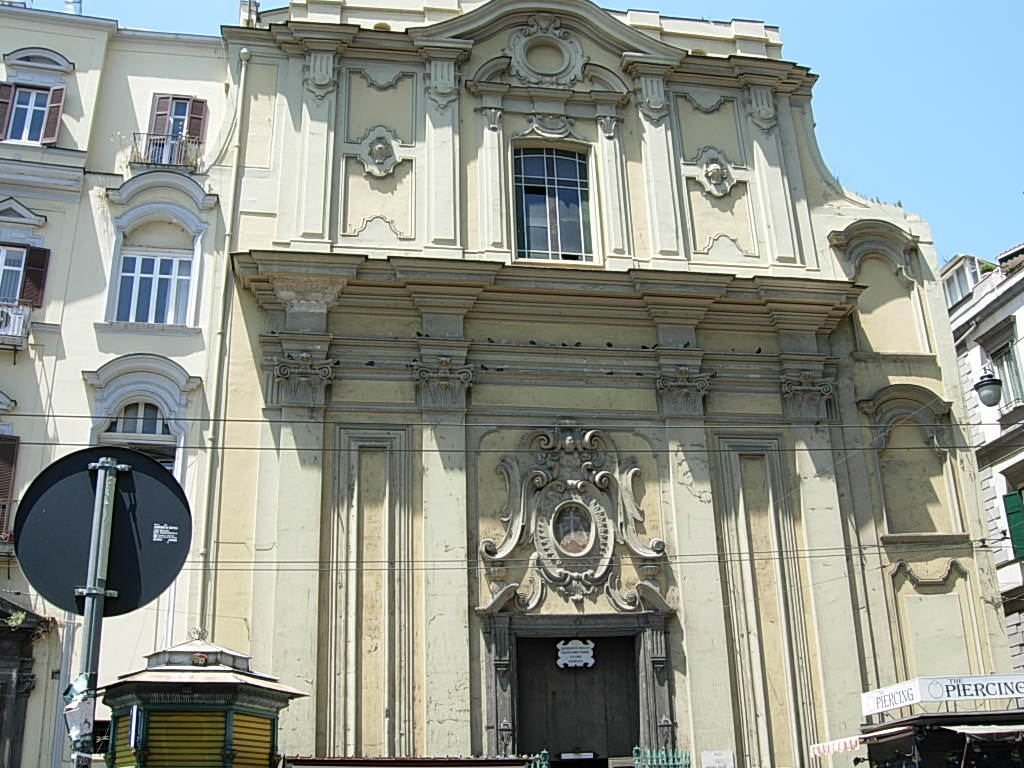
The façade of Santa Maria di Caravaggio

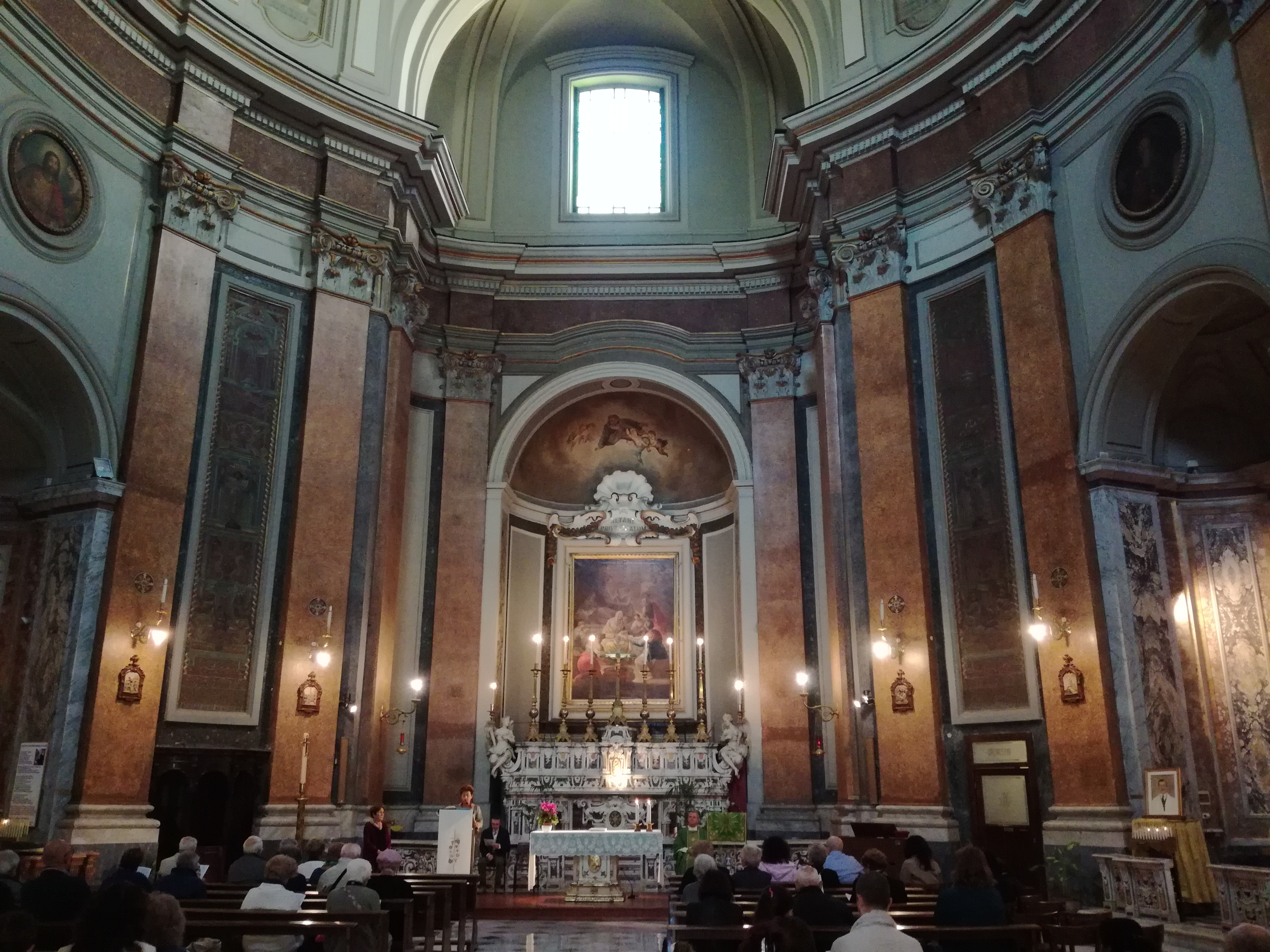
Interior

The main altarpiece contains a painting entitled The Birth of Mary, painted by Gaetano Gigante. The chapels to the right have paintings of St Joseph by Francesco Solimena, an anonymous Madonna della Provvidenza, and a Deposition by Domenico Antonio Vaccaro. The chapels on the left have a Sant'Antonio Zaccaria, by Luigi Scorrano; the tomb of the Barnabite priest, St. Francis Xavier Bianchi, and a painting depicting the apparition of the Virgin to peasants in Caravaggio. Other works in the church were completed by Errico Giovine and Giuseppe Bonolis.

== Bibliography ==
- Vincenzo Regina, Le chiese di Napoli. Viaggio indimenticabile attraverso la storia artistica, architettonica, letteraria, civile e spirituale della Napoli sacra, Newton e Compton editore, Napoli 2004.
