= Giovanni Battista Nauclerio =

Italian architect and engineer

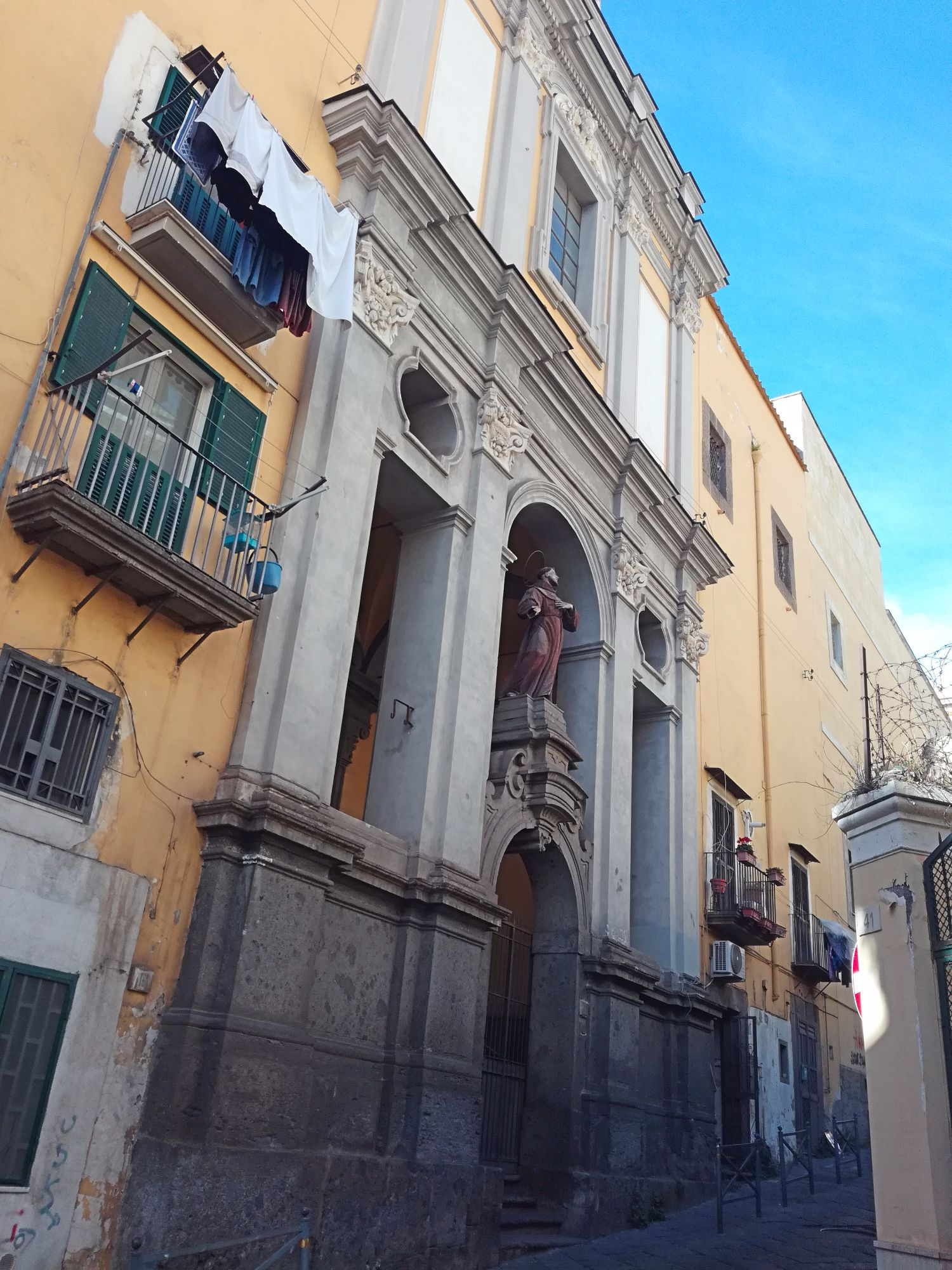
San Francesco degli Scarioni by Nauclerio.

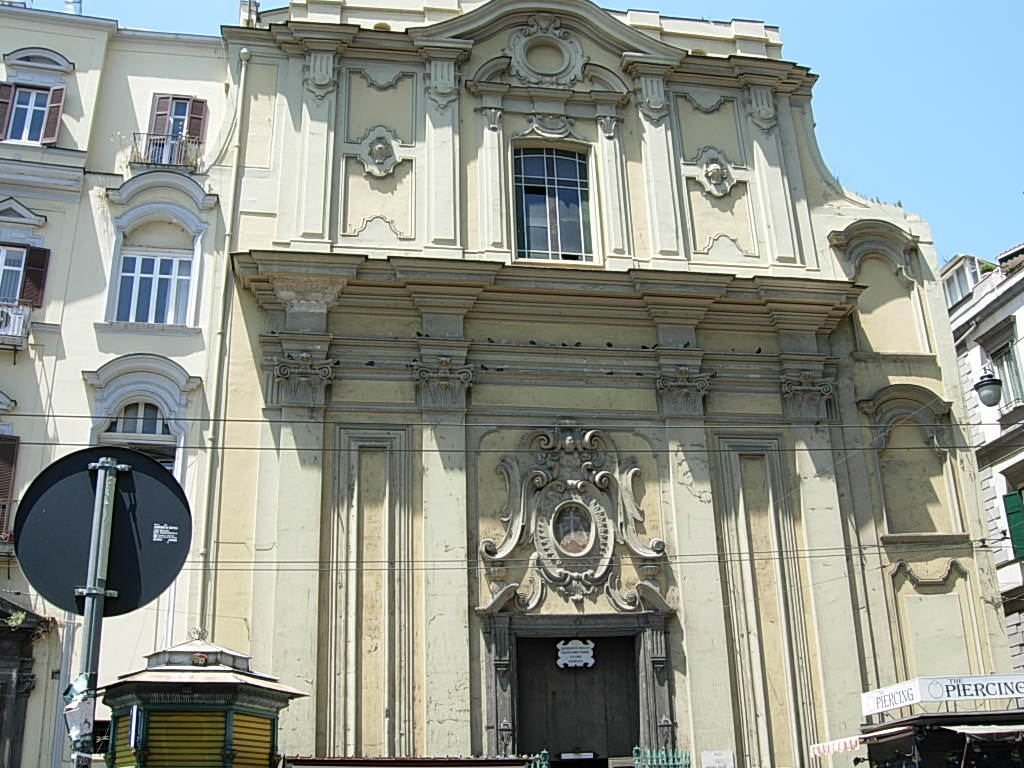
Facade of Santa Maria di Caravaggio by Nauclerio.

Giovanni Battista Nauclerio (Naples, 1666 - Naples, 1739) was an Italian architect and engineer, active in Naples, Kingdom of Naples.

== Biography ==
Nauclerio is described as one of the Naples architects who went against the grain, paving the way for columned neoclassicism of the 18th century. He took over the work for the completion of the cloister of San Domenico Maggiore from his collaborator Francesco Antonio Picchiati. In 1704, he designed the church and monasteries of San Francesco degli Scarioni. In 1704, he designed the church of Santi Demetrio e Bonifacio. In 1708, he completed the construction of the church of San Giovanni Battista delle Monache, which had been designed by Francesco Picchiatti. In 1720, he designed Villa Paternò on the hill of Capodimonte. After the death of Arcangelo Guglielmelli in 1723, he helped complete the church of Santa Maria delle Grazie a Mondragone. He also helped the main altar for the church of San Diego all'Ospedaletto, the baldacchino in San Pietro ad Aram, and likely aided in the restructuring of Santi Bernardo e Margherita and the church of Santa Maria di Caravaggio.
