= Mariano Arciero =

Italian priest

Blessed Mariano Arciero
- Born: 26 February 1707; Contursi Terme, Salerno, Kingdom of Naples
- Died: 16 February 1788 (aged 80); Naples, Kingdom of Naples
- Venerated in: Roman Catholic Church
- Beatified: 24 June 2012, Contursi Terme, Italy by Cardinal Angelo Amato
- Feast: 16 February

Mariano Arciero (26 February 1707 – 16 February 1788) was an Italian priest of the Roman Catholic Church. As a priest in Naples he exercised his functions as both a pastor and theologian, and was later known as the "Apostle of Calabria" due to his tireless apostolate and efforts in evangelization. His beatification was celebrated on 24 June 2012.

== Life ==
Mariano Arciero was born in Contursi Terme in 1707 to the poor Mattia Arciero and Autilia Marmora. In his childhood, he fostered a strong devotion to the Mother of God whom he called "Mamma bella".

The parish priest Emanuele Parisio took him under his personal care for educational purposes. Parisio instructed him and requested that he teach catechise his fellow children. He later moved from his home to Naples in 1729, where he attended a Eucharistic Congregation which the Jesuit Francesco Pavone had established; he enrolled in the congregation on 21 December 1729. He undertook philosophical studies and also studied literature. It was also during this time that Parisio took charge of his theological studies which allowed for him to be ordained to the priesthood on 22 December 1731.

Arciero soon became a model for his fellow priests: he was active in all charitable acts and visited hospitals and other places to be with his people for his pastoral mission. Gennaro Fortunato, the Bishop of Cassano, desired that Arciero be in his diocese. Arciero devoted himself to the education of children and was known for astonishing conversions. He spent hours teaching catechism to children as well as preaching. To that end he was known as the "Apostle of Calabria" due to his tireless apostolate. The bishop also named him as the first parish priest for Altomonte and then for the Annunciation church (under construction at the time) in Maratea. The death of Fortunato in 1751 prompted Arciero to return to Naples.

In 1768, he was named as the spiritual director for a diocesan congregation for the supervision of priests. He was later named as the director, at the instance of Cardinal Antonio Sersale. Arciero spent much time in contemplation of the Eucharist and was known for his frugal manner of living. His dress habits were kept to a minimum and he slept and ate little.

Arciero died on 16 February 1788 at 4:00 pm after suffering from ill health. Following his death Mary Frances of the Five Wounds said that she saw the angels guide his soul to Heaven. His remains were kept in state for just under a week to accommodate the long stream of Neapolitans who came to see him. The remains were later moved on 15 October 1950 to his hometown to the Santa Maria degli Angeli church. Arciero's remains were exhumed in that church on 28 January 2012 for canonical inspection and for the collection of relics. The reconnaissance – lasting about six hours – found most of the skeleton with the skullcap. Hair was found in addition to 25 teeth, with two of those teeth still attached to the jaw. Pieces of his cassock were found as was a single button.

== Beatification ==
The beatification process opened on 24 April 1830 under Pope Pius VIII and the late priest became titled as a Servant of God. His spiritual writings were approved by theologians on 10 September 1839. Two local processes in Naples in addition to Salerno were held and both were validated on 30 September 1842 so that the cause could continue under the direction of the Congregation for Rites. Pope Pius IX approved his life of heroic virtue and proclaimed him to be Venerable on 14 August 1854.

The miracle required for his beatification (a healing medicine and science fail to explain) was investigated from 11 February 1953 until 17 November 1954, in Campagna and received validation decades later from the Congregation for the Causes of Saints (C.C.S) on 31 March 2008. Medical experts issued unanimous approval for the healing in question to be regarded as a legitimate miracle on 4 March 2010; theologians agreed with the verdict on 19 November 2010 (also unanimously) as did the cardinal and bishop members of the C.C.S. on 5 April 2011. It received final approval from Pope Benedict XVI on 27 June 2011, who appointed Cardinal Angelo Amato – the prefect of the Congregation for the Causes of Saints to preside over the beatification. This was held in Terme on 24 June 2012.

== See also ==
- Catholic Church in Italy
- List of beatified people
