= Cesare Calense =

Italian painter

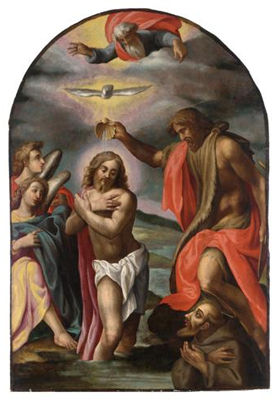
Cesare Calense, The Baptism of Christ, c. 1600

Cesare Calense (died 1640) was a native of the province of Lecce in the kingdom of Naples, Italy. He painted a Deposition for the church of St John the Baptist in Naples.
