= Gesù delle Monache =

Church of Gesù delle Monache
- Chiesa di Gesù delle Monache
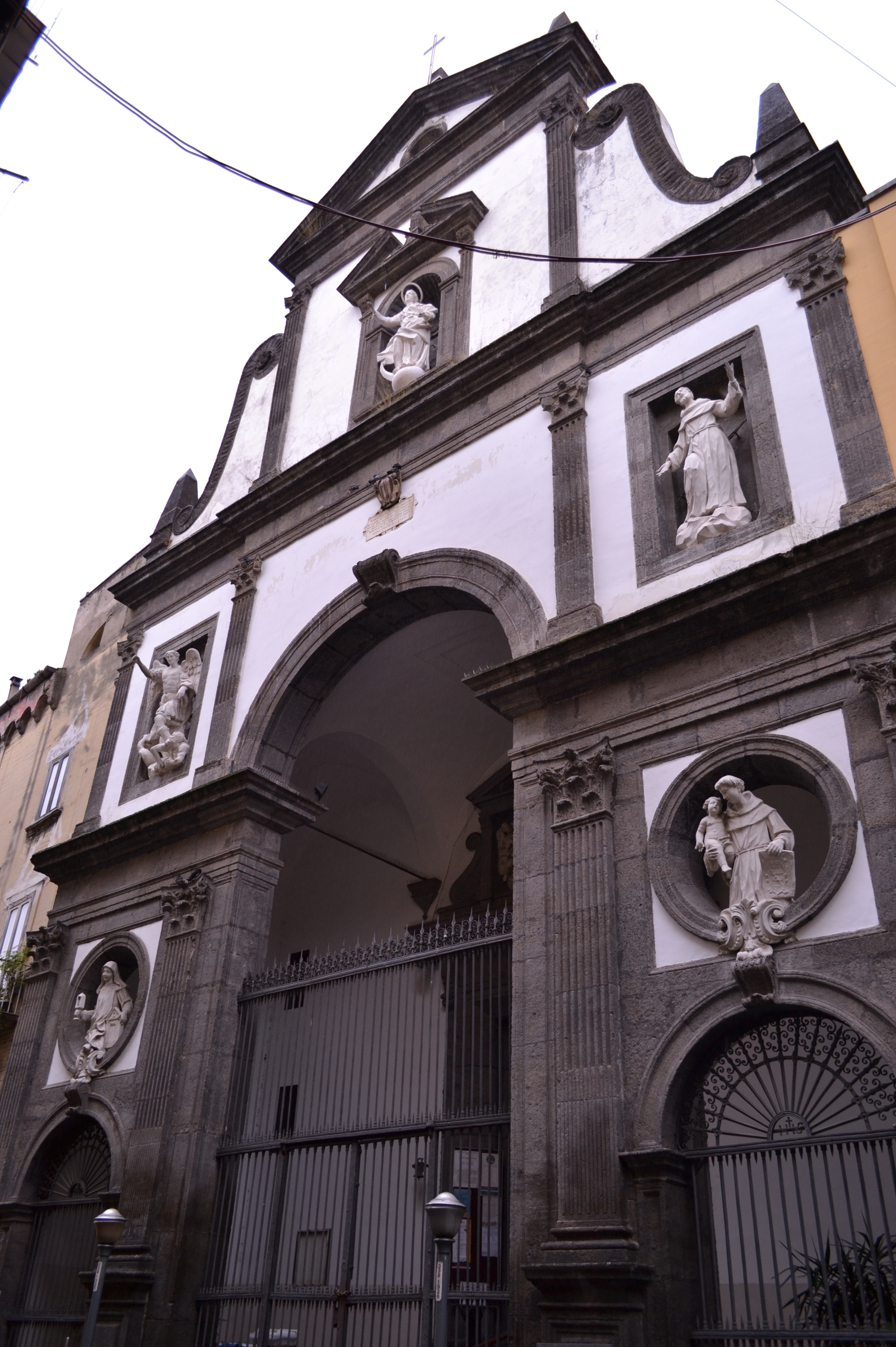
- Façade.
- Church of Gesù delle Monache
- 40.854666°N 14.256478°E
- Location: Naples; Province of Naples, Campania
- Country: Italy
- Denomination: Roman Catholic

History
- Status: Active

Architecture
- Architectural type: Church
- Style: Renaissance architecture, Baroque architecture

Administration
- Diocese: Roman Catholic Archdiocese of Naples

Gesù delle Monache is a Roman Catholic church located near the Porta San Gennaro in central Naples, Italy. Over the years, the church was also a parish church known as San Giovanni Evangelista in Porta San Gennaro or San Giovanni in Porta.

== History ==
The initial impetus for the church was the wishes of Joanna of Aragon, Queen of Naples (1455-1517), the wife of Ferdinand I of Naples, who hoped to make the church a royal pantheon. Despite a will stipulating this, the Aragonese dynasty remained buried in San Domenico. The church of Gesù delle Monache was completed in 1582 by the Montalto family, and was affiliated with a Clarissan nunnery.

The late-Renaissance style façade is sober relative to the decorated Baroque interior, the latter designed by Arcangelo Guglielmelli. Paintings in the church were made or attributed to Cesare Turco, Lorenzo Vaccaro, Enrico Pini, Fabrizio Santafede, Nicola Cacciapuoti, Francesco Solimena (St Clare in Glory), Paolo De Matteis (Scenes of the Life of St Clare). Luca Giordano was prolific in this church, painting an Immaculate conception (1683), Annunciation, Marriage of the Virgin, St Anthony preaches to the Fish, St Anthony heals a wounded foot (1685), and a St John the Baptist in the Sacristy. The maiolica pavement was completed by 1731 by Francesco Della Monica and Agostino Di Filippo.

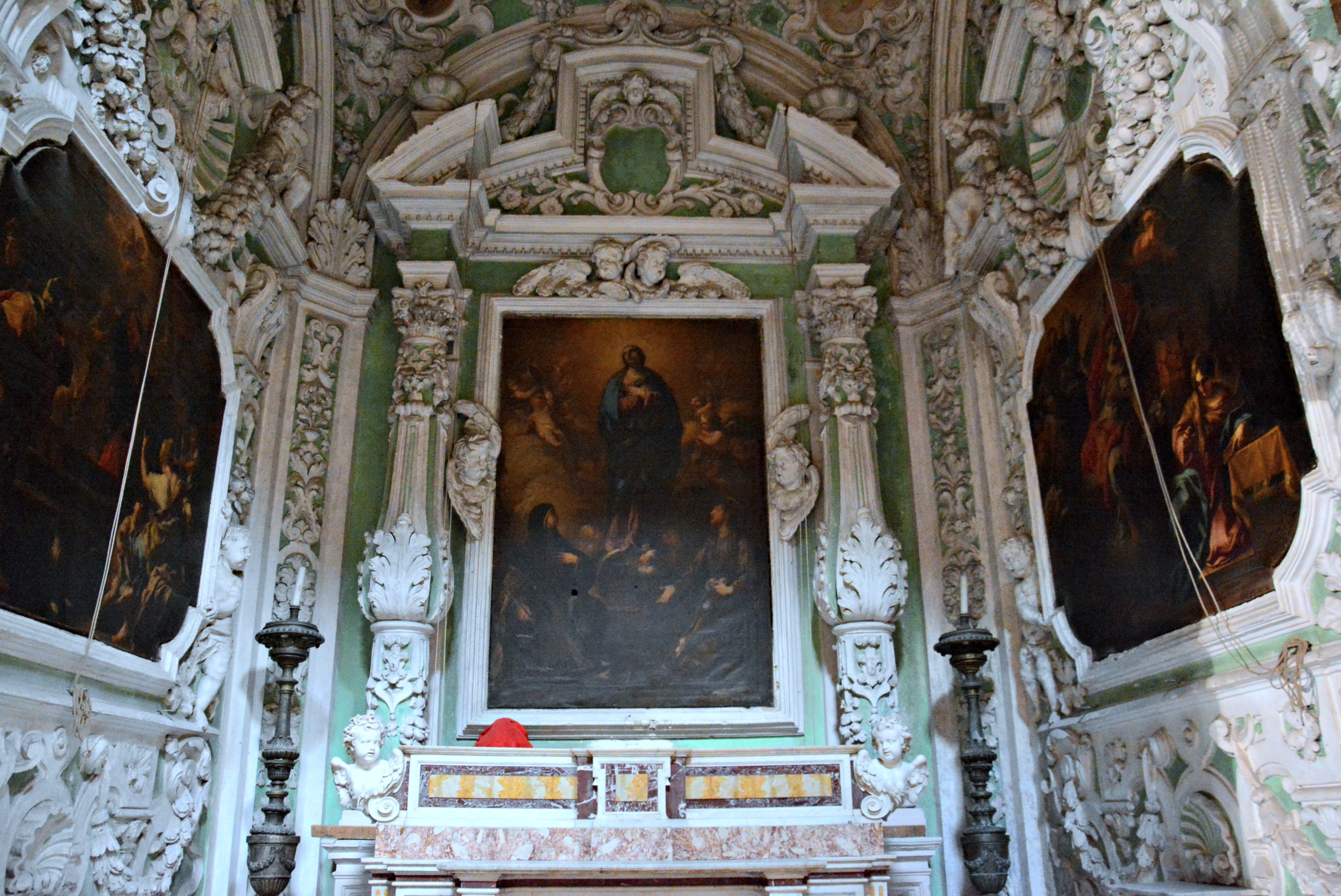
Chapel

== Gallery ==
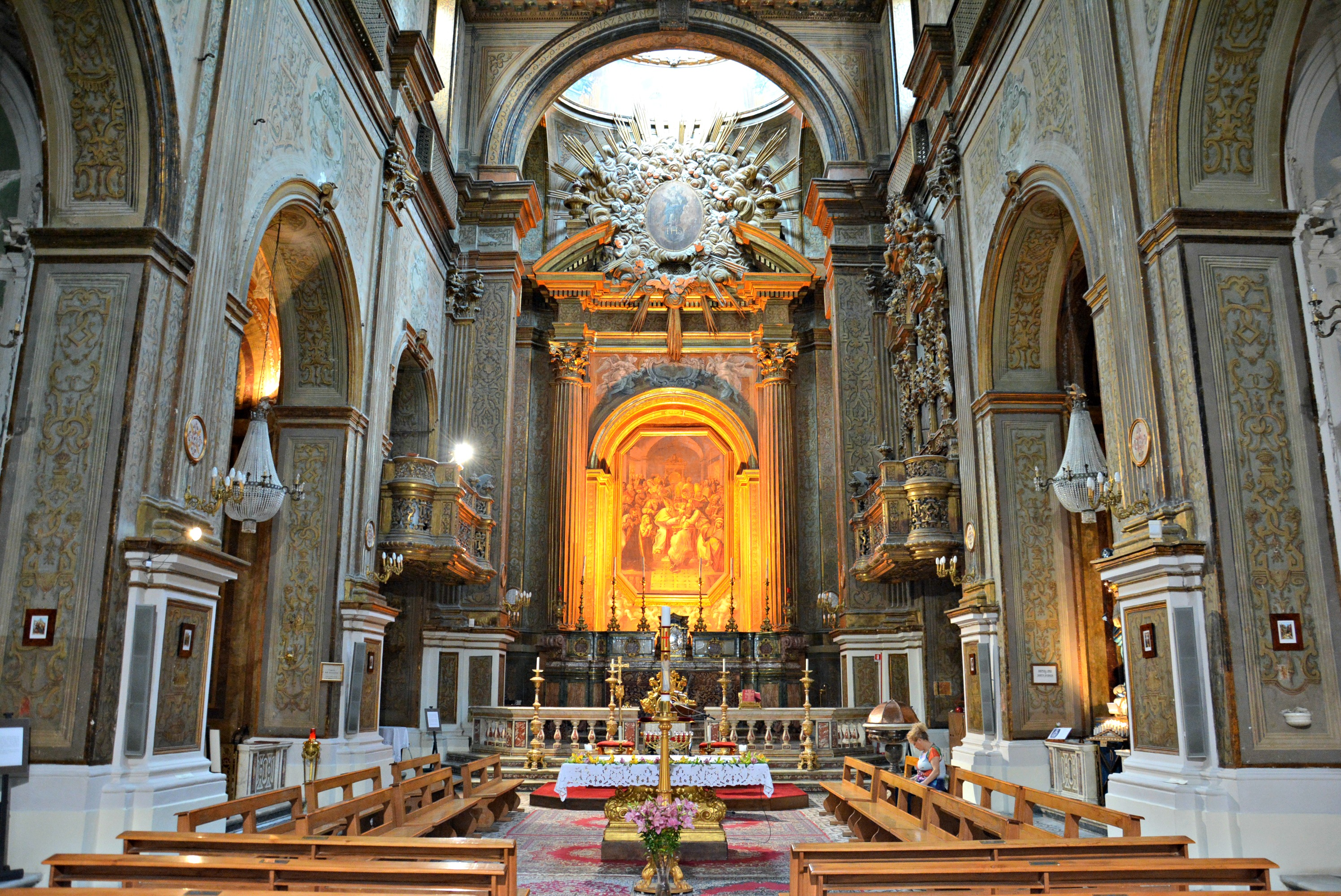
Interior.

== Bibliography ==
- Vincenzo Regina (2004). Newton & Compton (ed.). Le chiese di Napoli. Viaggio indimenticabile attraverso la storia artistica, architettonica, letteraria, civile e spirituale della Napoli sacra. Roma. ISBN 88-541-0062-5.
