= San Giovanni Battista delle Monache =

Coordinates: 40.850942°N 14.251495°E

- Chiesa di San Giovanni Battista delle Monache
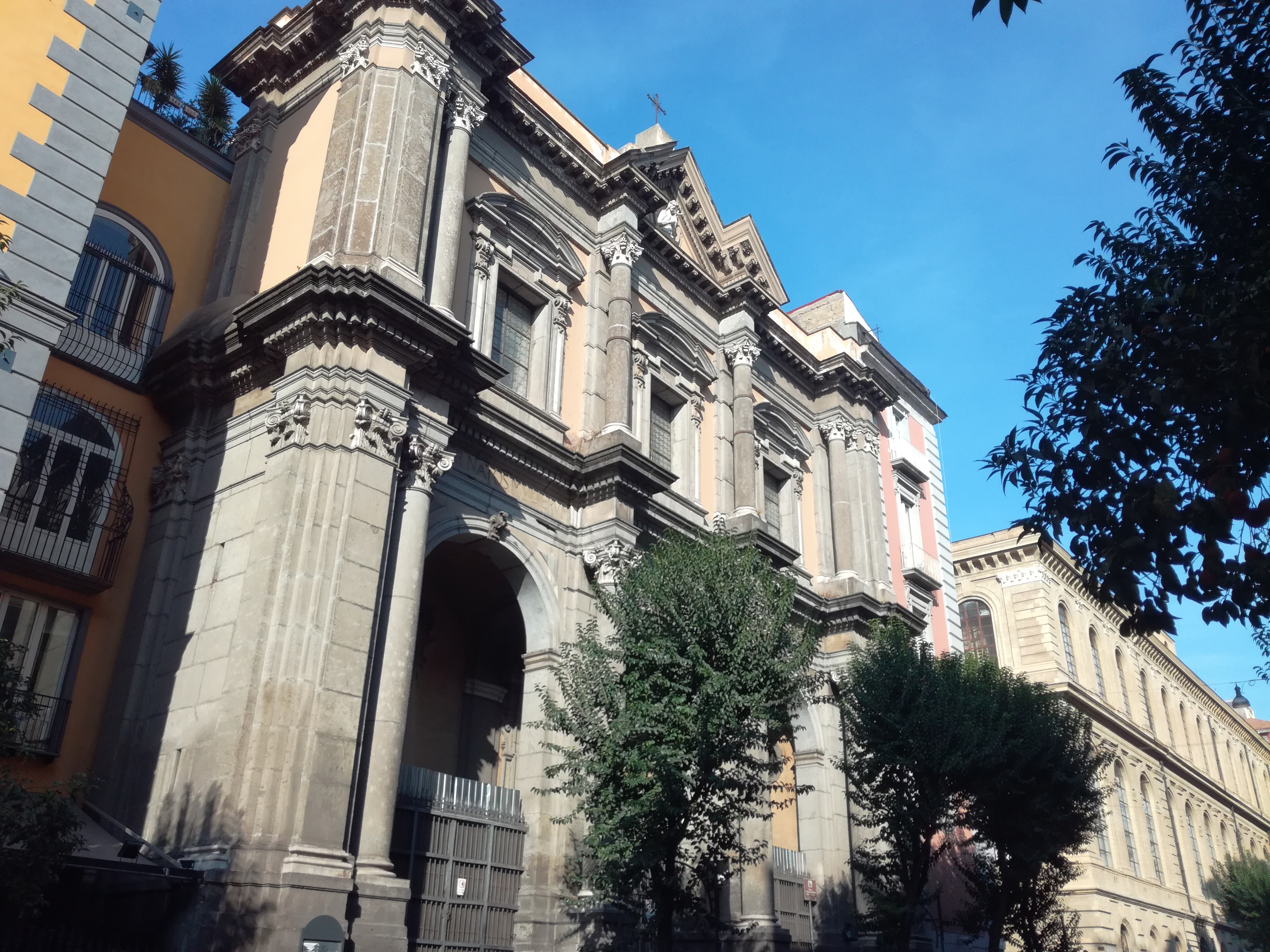
- The façade.
- San Giovanni Battista delle Monache
- Location: Naples
- Country: Italy
- Denomination: Roman Catholic

Architecture
- Architectural type: Church

Administration
- Diocese: Roman Catholic Archdiocese of Naples

San Giovanni Battista delle Monache is a former Roman Catholic church located in Via Costantinopoli 106 in central Naples, region of Campania, Italy.

== History ==
Cesare Calense (?-1640) painted a Deposition for the original church around 1590-1600. The present church was built mainly during 1673-1681 using designs by Francesco Antonio Picchiatti. The facade was added in the 18th century, and was designed by Giovan Battista Nauclerio. In the 19th century, the Cloister of San Giovanniello, standing across Via Sapienza, became the home of the Accademia di Belle Arti in Naples. This urban reconstruction was directed by Enrico Alvino; and involved the demolition the Vasto Bastion, to make way for the Teatro Bellini. The damage from the 1930 earthquake was not restored until 1970, and all the movable interior decoration was moved. The church was closed and under restoration in 2011.

== Interior ==
The lateral chapels contained paintings by Luca Giordano, Francesco di Maria, Bernardo Cavallino, Giovanni Balducci, Nicola Fumo, and Andrea Vaccaro. It also contained paintings by Massimo Stanzione, Giacomo Farelli, and Paolo De Matteis; the sculptural decoration has suffered much damage.

== Bibliography ==
- Napoli sacra. Guida alle chiese della città, coordinamento scientifico di Nicola Spinosa; curated by Gemma Cautela, Leonardo Di Mauro, Renato Ruotolo, Naples, Italy 1993-1997, 15 fascicoli
