= San Francesco degli Scarioni, Naples =

Church building in Naples, Italy

Coordinates: 40.8336°N 14.2257°E

San Francesco degli Scarioni is a Roman Catholic church located on a narrow street, Via Arco Mirelli #19, in central Naples, Italy. It was founded and still property of the Franciscan order.

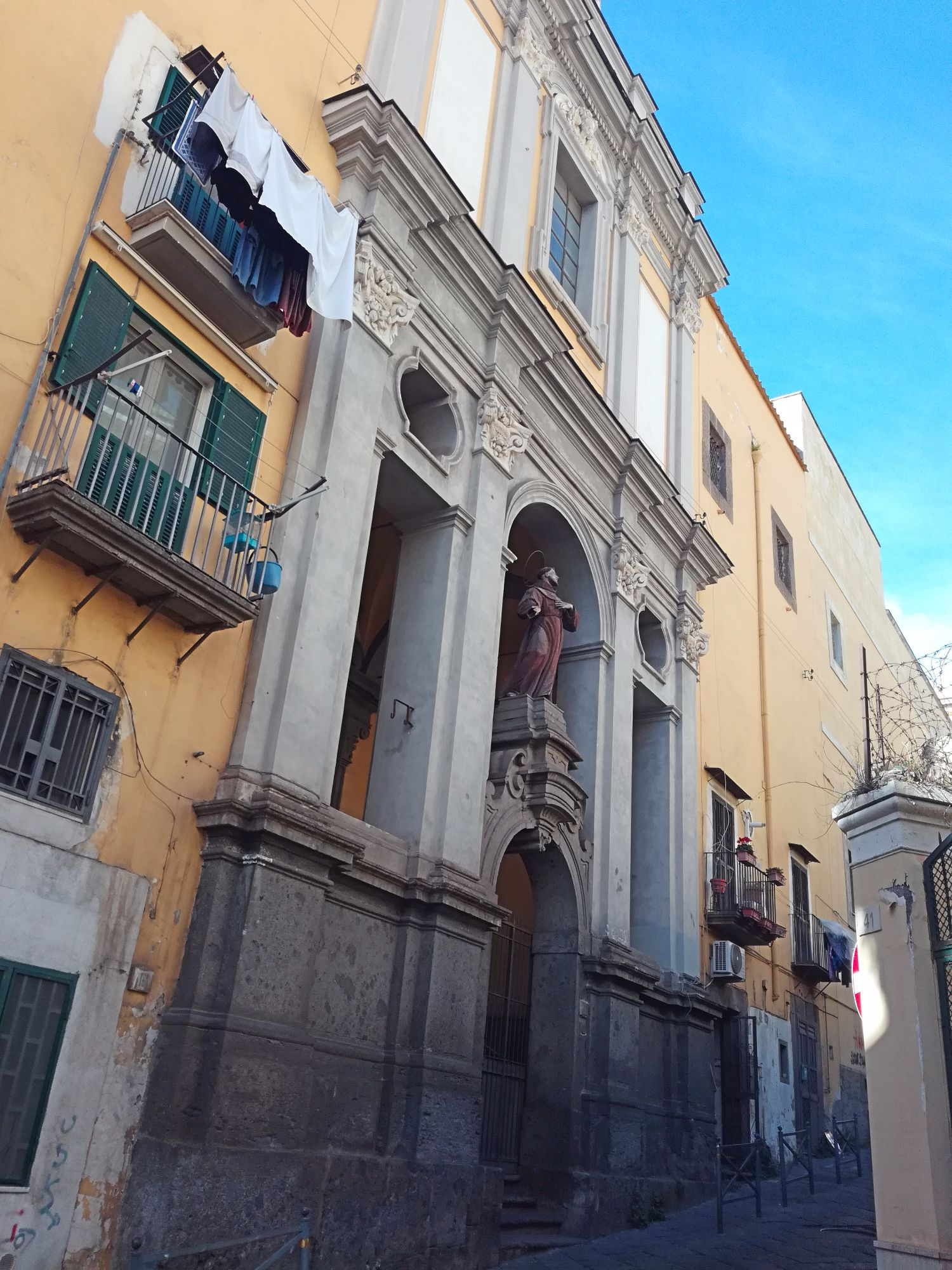
St Francis statue on facade.

== History ==
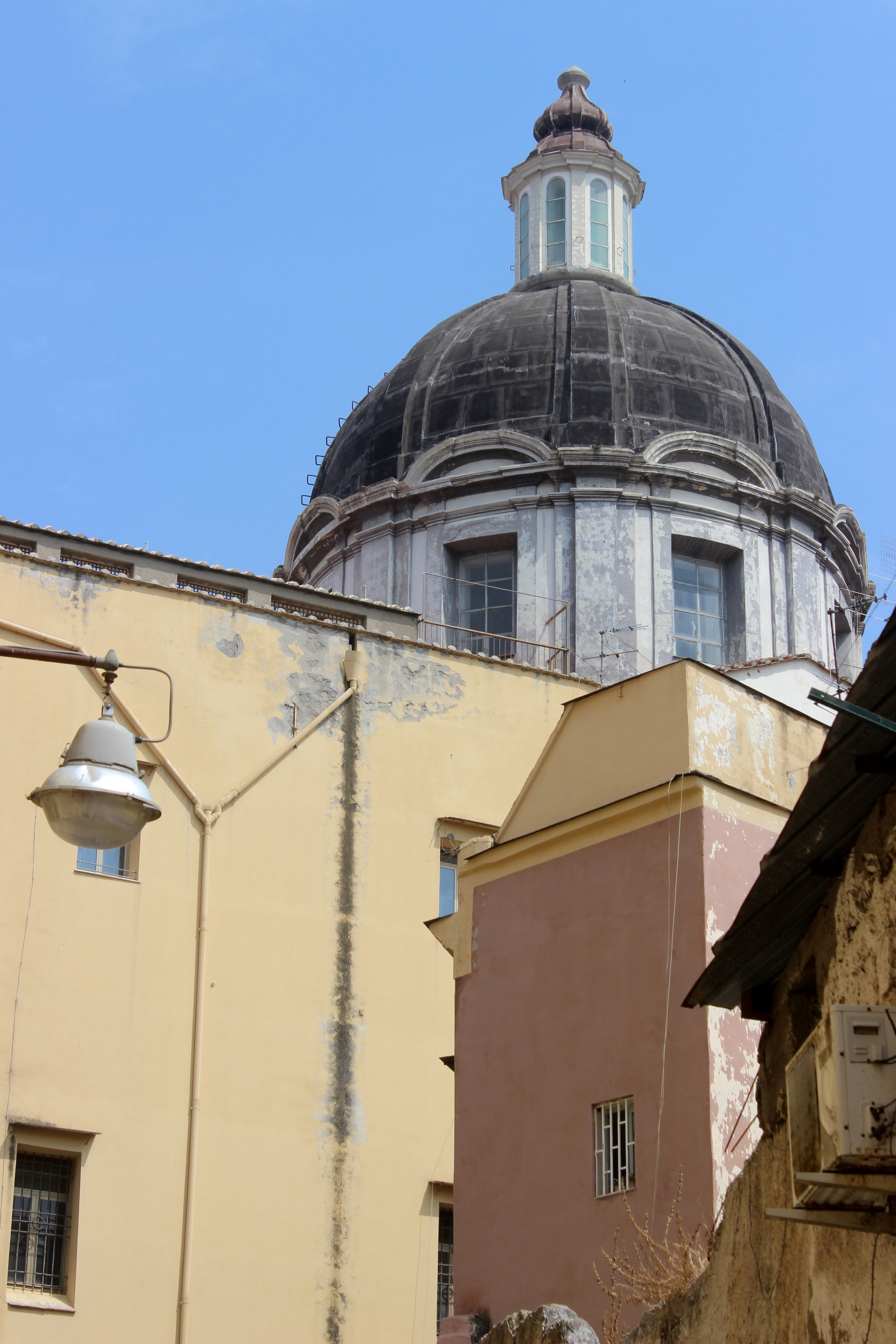
Dome of Church.

Construction of the present church began in 1704 using designs by Giovanni Battista Nauclerio, and was completed in 1721. The patron had been Leonardo Scarioni, merchant from Tuscany who had died 1701 without heirs, and endowed a convent of Franciscans from his native lands.

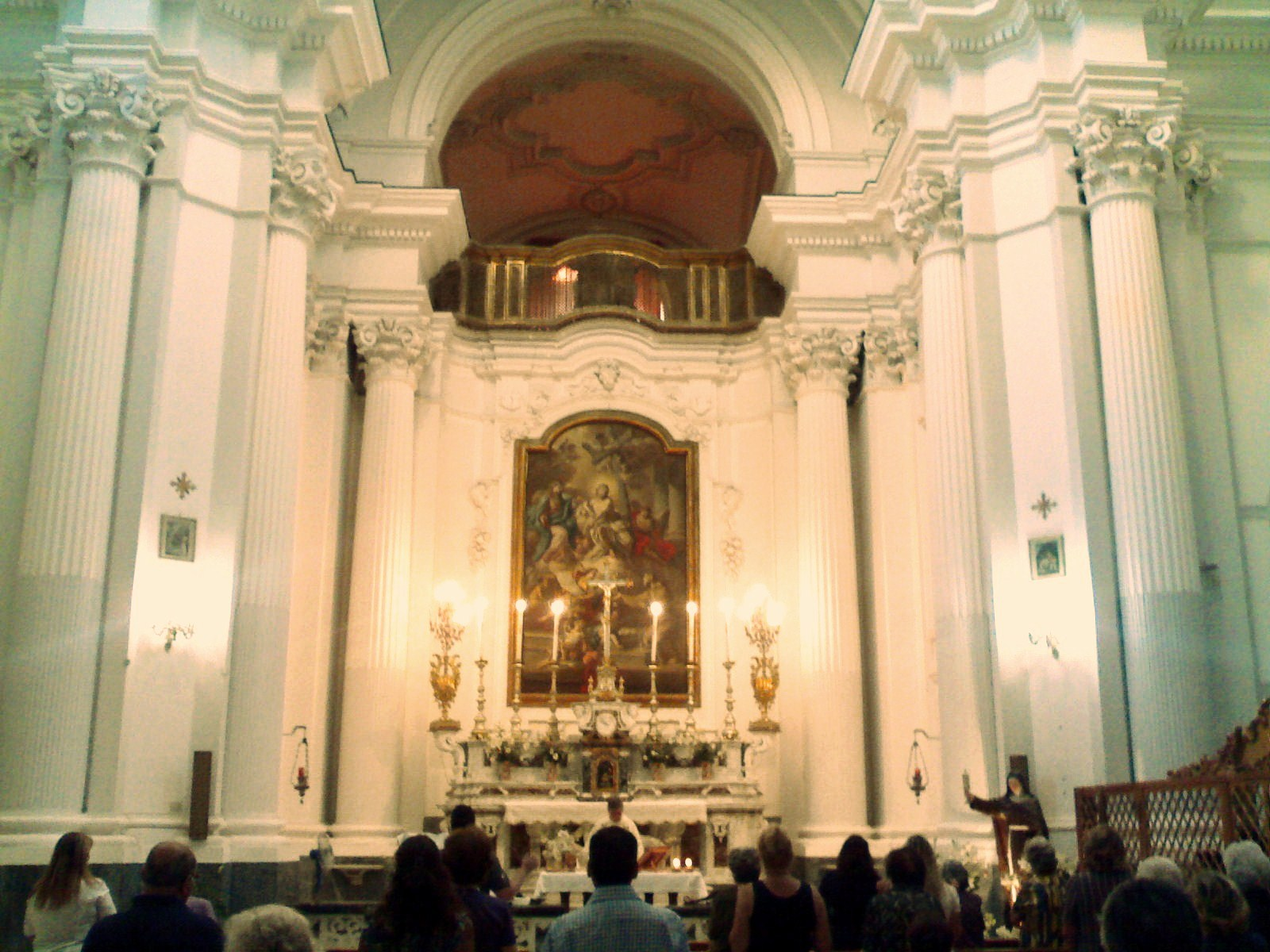
Interior with De Mura altarpiece.

The facade has a wooden statue of St Francis. The main altar (1755) has a canvas depicting Christ and the Virgin granting indulgences to St Francis (1773) by Francesco De Mura. The sacristy has a canvas depicting Conversation with the Crucifix by St Thomas (1580) by Marcus Laurus, held in lunette frescoed with the Virgin with St John the Baptist and St Michael Archangel. The musical organ dates to 1721.
