= Santi Demetrio e Bonifacio =

Former church building in Naples, Italy

Santi Demetrio e Bonifacio is a former-Roman Catholic church located on Piazzetta Teodoro Monticelli, in central Naples, Italy. It is now used for meetings and exhibitions by the Department of Architecture of the University of Naples.

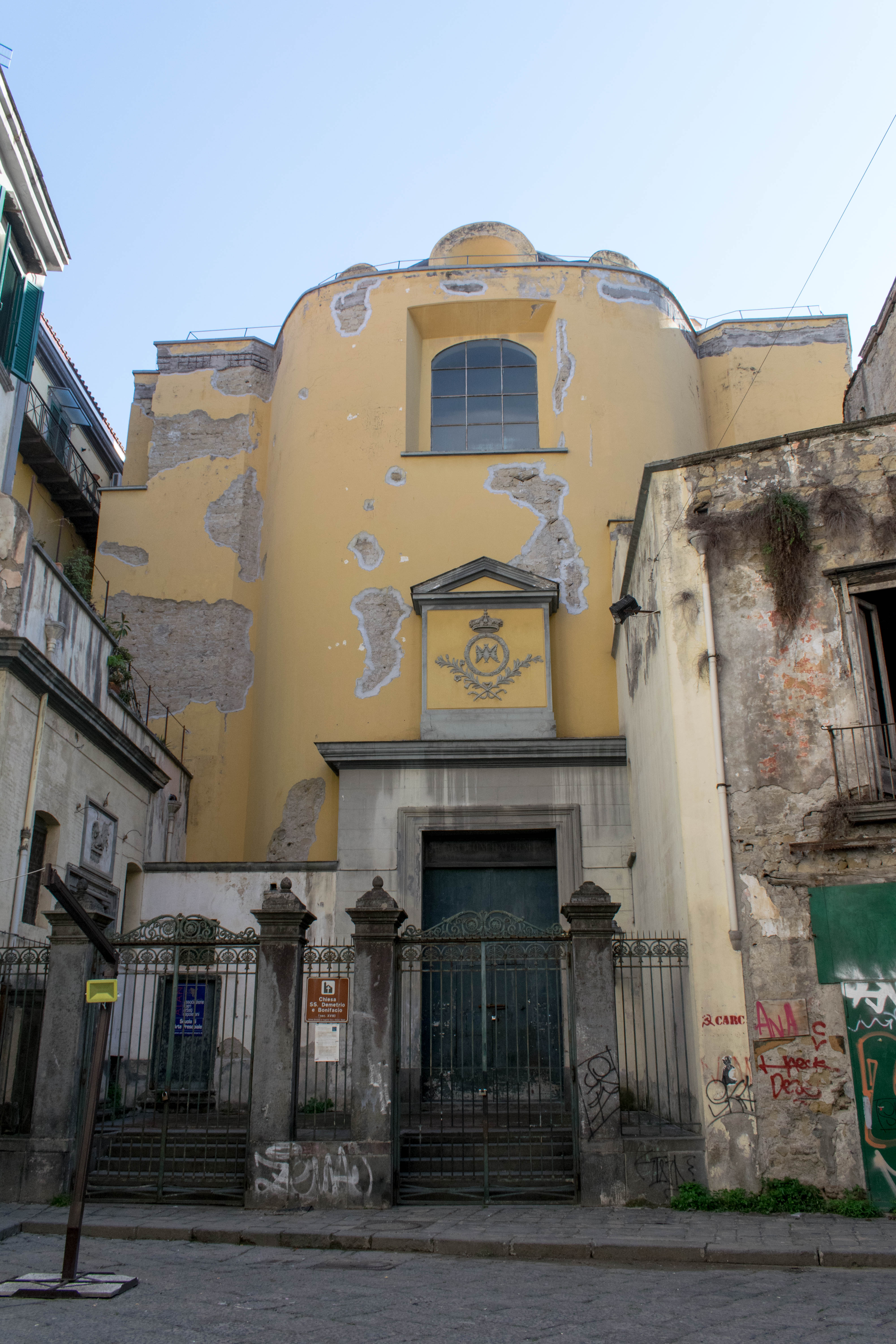
facade

== History ==
Construction of the present church began in 1706 using designs by Giovanni Battista Nauclerio. The site had once held a small chapel or oratory dedicated to San Demetrio. And in 1683, Somaschi order acquired an adjacent palace, Palazzo Penna, where they housed the monks, and decided to build the adjacent church. The layout was that of a Greek Cross, and interrupted in 1725 due to lack of funds. Only completed and the interior decorated after 1748. The main altarpiece, on a polychrome marble altar, depicts a Madonna with Saints Demetrio and Bonifacio by Nicola Maria Rossi. The lateral altars have canvases depicting a Madonna and child with Saints Paul the Hermit, Leonard Abbot, and Gerolamo Emiliani by Antonio Romeo, and a Madonna and Child with St Gerolamo Emiliani by Gennaro Gamba.

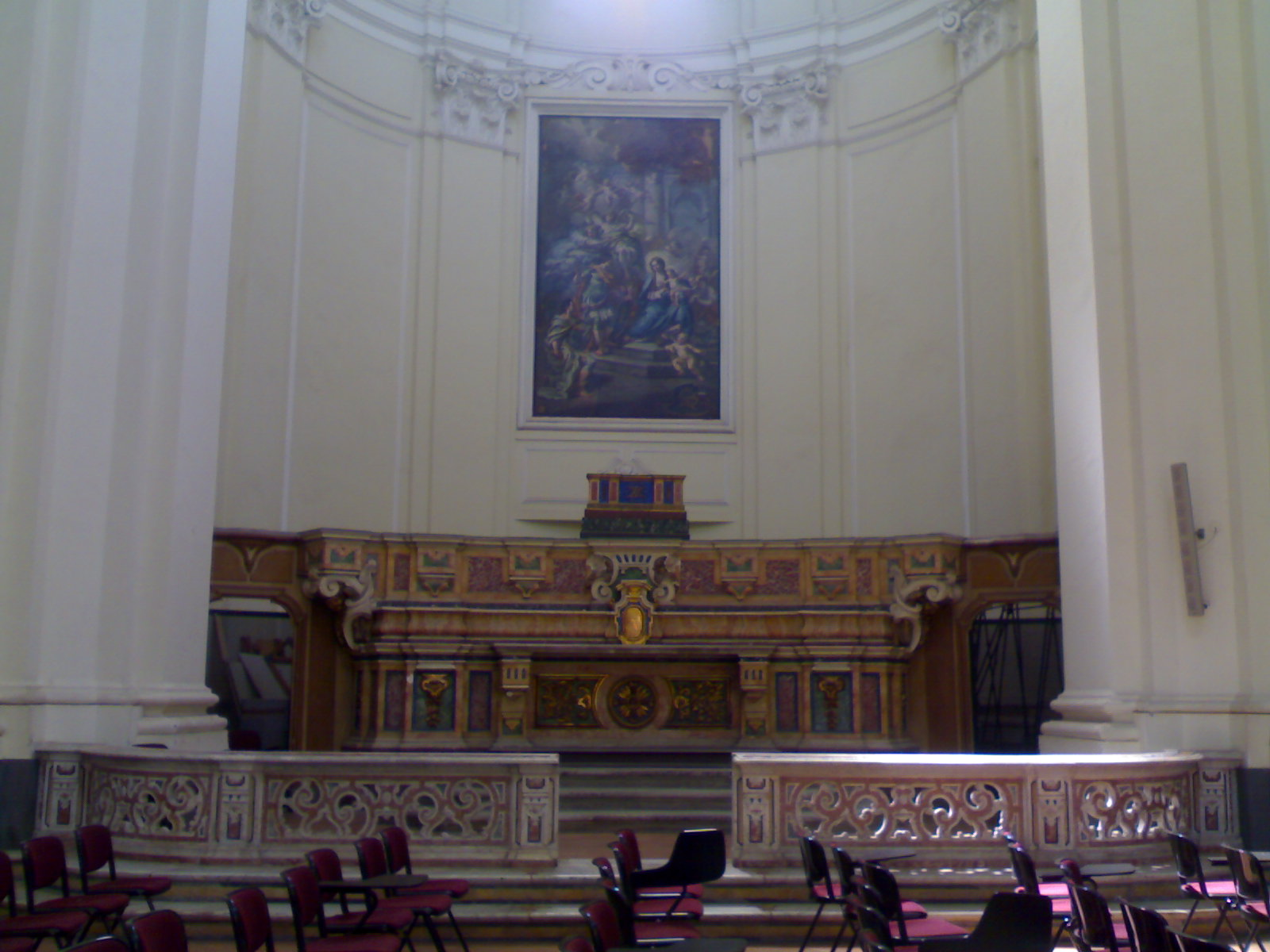
Interior with main altar

With the 19th-century suppression of orders, the church fell to the jurisdiction of the Archbishop, then a Congregation of Studies (1821), and a Arch-Confraternity of the Visitation (1907). Abandoned and dilapidated, it underwent restoration in 1987. Now property of the Ateneo fridericiano di Napoli it is used for meetings and exhibitions by the Faculty of Architecture of the Scuola Politechnica e delle Scienze di Base of the University of Studi di Napoli Federico II.
