= Arcangelo Guglielmelli =

Italian architect and painter

Arcangelo Guglielmelli (c. 1650 – 1723) was an Italian architect and painter, active in his native Naples, Italy, in a late-Baroque style. He was involved in the building and reconstruction of churches, many of which had been damaged by the earthquakes of 1688 and 1694.

== Biography ==
He was born to Marcello Guglielmelli and Caterina Vera but grew up in the house of a painter, Onofrio de Marino, whose daughter he married in March 1677. His two sons were Marcello, also an architect who worked with his father, and Gaetano, who became a novice at Santa Maria della Vita.

Early in his career, Arcangelo helped design ephemeral decorations for the frequent festivals held in Naples, such as in 1671 for the festival of San Gennaro, and 1677 for the festival of Quarantore, held by the Theatines of San Paolo Maggiore. He trained under Dionisio Lazzari.

In 1677, in the church of Gesù delle Monache, Arcangelo worked on the reconstruction of the presbytery and added a small elliptical dome to provide light, a solution he later adopted also in the church of San Antonio delle Monache a Port'Alba, where between 1682 and 1684 he provided the stucco decoration. Arcangelo worked further on the church of Gesù delle Monache in 1692.

In 1678 he worked in Santa Maria della Consolazione agli Incurabili and the chapel of San Biagio in Santa Maria della Stella. Following the earthquake of 1688, the presbytery was expanded, and an elliptical dome was added to the small church of the Cross of San Agostino. Starting from 1694 in the same church, Arcangelo in collaboration with Lorenzo Vaccaro, provided the stucco ornamentation. In 1682, Arcangelo helped design the baroque facade Santa Maria in Portico a Chiaia.

From 1690 to 1693, Arcangelo worked on the reconstruction of the church of Santa Maria del Rosario alle Pigne (Rosario al largo delle Pigne). The plan there was a pseudo-Greek cross with transverse arms shorter than the longitudinal nave. He also designed the atrium (1708) with statues in niches.

Starting in 1691 he worked in the Augustinian monastery of Santa Maria degli Angeli a Pizzofalcone, where he modified Francesco Picchiatti and Cosimo Fanzago's original project from 1646 (construction began in 1661). Here the final plan recalls the church of Santa Maria dell'Aiuto (where Arcangelo worked under Lazzari in 1672). Also by Arcangelo are the design of San Michele Arcangelo in Anacapri (1698) and Santa Maria delle Grazie, in Piazzetta Mondragone (begun 1715). This last one was likely completed with the intervention of Guglielmelli's main pupil, Giovanni Battista Nauclerio. Arcangelo was also the author of restorations after 1688 of the cathedrals of Amalfi and Salerno.

After the 1688 earthquake, he was involved in the reconstruction of the Cathedral of San Gennaro. For example, he helped restore the ancient basilica of Santa Restituta, adjacent to the Cathedral. Some of his restorations, including this one, cause some grief because the updating obscured the original architecture. For example, Arcangelo added stucco decorations around the Angevin gothic arches. His reconstruction obscured many of the original elements of the church.

The second major earthquake that struck Naples in 1694, increased the commissions for restorations. he worked on Santa Maria Donnalbina, where Arcangelo added a chancel with a dome (the contract of 1695) and then, at the turn of the century, the completion of the Church of San Carlo all'Arena.

The ancient basilica of San Giorgio Maggiore, also required restoration, retaining today only the apse triforium with columns and pilasters. Here Fanzago had begun reconstruction in 1640 after the plague, work interrupted by the plague of 1656. Work was not completed until the early eighteenth century.

In 1693, Arcangelo succeeded architect Giovanni Battista Contini as architect for the abbey of Montecassino, where he built and restructured the hostel and infirmary, as well as renovated the medieval basilica (1694). In the church (already by then with a remodeled presbytery and altar by Fanzago), Arcangelo and his son Marcello completed the decoration. Between 1689 and 1696, Arcangelo helped restore the facade of the church of San Paolo Maggiore.

From 1677 onward, Arcangelo worked for the Jesuits in the church of Gesù Nuovo, but only after 1688, did he succeed as a main architect from Dionisio Lazzari (who had taken the post from Fanzago in 1678). He rebuilt, between 1692 and 1693, the fallen dome (1629–35) of Giuseppe Valeriano, but Arcangelo's dome also developed flaws and was demolished in 1775. Arcangelo also restored the chapels of St Francis Xavier and St Ignatius, and Bartolomeo and Pietro Ghetti overlaid a rich baroque decoration into the Renaissance style entry portal.

== Work after 1690 ==
From 1691 onward, the Dominicans commissioned a number of works from Arcangelo, including enlarging the church of Sanità a Barra, but here, in 1703he was replaced by the rising Francesco Solimena. He had been replaced in his work at San Paolo Maggiore by Solimena in 1701. Meanwhile, in 1699, Arcangelo completed the rebuilding of the Angevin church of St. Antonio Abate (or di Vienna), providing new windows, a nave ceiling, and an altar. Also for the Dominicans, Arcangelo helped design a home of the congregation of St. Vincent Ferrer being founded on the grounds of the convent of Santa Maria della Sanità, Naples (1705). In the apse of the church at that site, he created an ornamented altar to contain a statue of the Madonna and Child by Michelangelo Naccherino.

After the death of Lazzari, Arcangelo also took over the building studios of the Gerolamini. With collaboration with Nicola de Marino, he completed the interior of the church of San Filippo Neri (1703), a work left unfinished by Lazzari. Arcangelo had already built the chapel of the Immaculate Conception in 1697, and in 1699 that of the Blessed Sacrament, where he worked as a quadratura painter, assisted by Giacomo del Po. Luigi Lanzi cites Arcangelo as one of the quadratura painters in Naples. Arcangelo also designed the main altar. In the monastery of this church, Arcangelo and his son also directed the construction of the library from 1723 to 1727. Arcangelo and his son Marcello reconstructed thine 1709 church of Sant'Angelo a Nilo.

For the neighboring monastery of San Giuseppe dei Ruffi, Arcangelo and Giovanni Domenico Vinaccia (another pupil of Lazzari), had already begun in 1689, reconstruction of the monastery. Work on the cloister and church was completed by his son Marcello in 1721.
