= Guglielmelli =

Guglielmelli is an Italian surname. Notable people with the surname include:

- Arcangelo Guglielmelli (c. 1650–1723), Italian architect and painter
- Joey Gugliemelli, American drag queen known as Sherry Pie
