= Mary Frances of the Five Wounds =

Third Order Franciscan and saint

Mary Frances of the Five Wounds TOSF
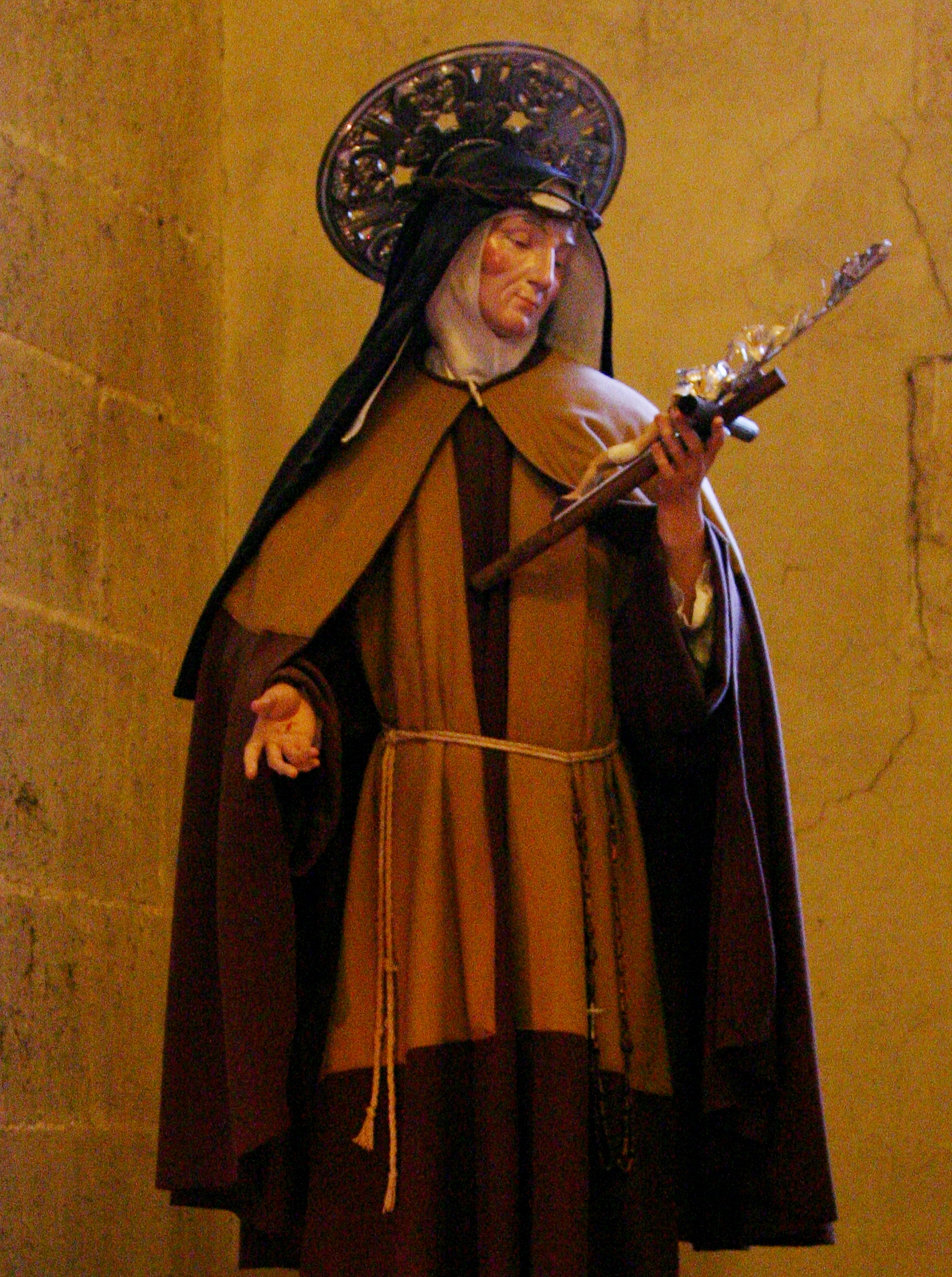
- Statue in Santa Chiara, Naples

Virgin
- Born: 25 March 1715; Naples, Kingdom of Naples
- Died: 7 October 1791; Naples, Kingdom of Naples
- Venerated in: Roman Catholic Church (Third Order of St. Francis and Naples, Italy)
- Beatified: 12 November 1843, Rome by Pope Gregory XVI
- Canonized: 29 June 1867, Rome by Pope Pius IX
- Major shrine: Shrine of St. Mary Frances of the Five Wounds, Naples, Italy
- Feast: October 6
- Patronage: expectant mothers, women having difficulty conceiving, Gallo World Family Foundation

Mary Frances of the Five Wounds, TOSF, (Italian: Maria Francesca delle Cinque Piaghe, born Anna Maria Gallo,, 25 March 1715 – 7 October 1791), was an Italian Third Order Franciscan who is honoured as a saint in the Catholic Church.

== Life ==
She was born Anna Maria Gallo, the daughter of Francesco Gallo and Barbara Basinsin, in the Quartieri Spagnoli (Spanish Quarter) of Naples, a red-light district of the city, still known for its high crime. According to tradition, another saint, the Jesuit, Francis de Geronimo, predicted her future sanctity while she was still an infant. Her family was of the middle class, but her father, a weaver of gold lace, was a very violent man, who regularly abused his family physically, often severely.

When Gallo was sixteen, her father attempted to force her into a marriage with a young man of means who was seeking her hand. She refused and asked to join the Franciscan Third Order, through which she could live out a religious life in the family home. The friars of Naples were part of the reform of Peter of Alcantara, and they and the tertiaries under their rule were known for the strictness of their lives. Through the intervention of a friar, Father Theophilus, permission to enter the Order was eventually granted by her father.

Gallo was received into the order on 8 September 1731 and began wearing the Franciscan religious habit. She also adopted the use of the religious name, out of her devotion to the Blessed Mother, Francis of Assisi and the Passion of Christ. She continued to live in the family home.

She took as her spiritual director, the Franciscan friar, John Joseph of the Cross, while her confessor was the Barnabite priest, Francis Xavier Bianchi, and she began to be known among her neighbors for her work of charity, helping the poor of the sector. She was a person of deep prayer, often spending long hours in meditation.

In 1753, she joined with another Franciscan tertiary, known only as Maria Felice, and they moved into a small house owned by a priest, Giovanni Pessiri, who became their spiritual director. The women occupied the second floor, sleeping on the floor, and the priest the floor above. She is said to have received the wounds of the stigmata while living there and suffered patiently many physical afflictions and spiritual trials. She would wear gloves to cover the marks on her hands while she did her work. She is also said to have had visions of Raphael the Archangel, who healed her of several afflictions.

== Veneration ==
Gallo was buried in the Franciscan Church of Santa Lucia al Monte in Naples, which she attended during her life. This church also contains the tomb of Saint John Joseph.

Gallo was declared venerable by Pope Pius VII, on 18 May 1803. She was beatified by Pope Gregory XVI on 12 November 1843 and was canonized by Pope Pius IX on 29 June 1867. Her feast day is celebrated on 6 October. She was the first woman from Naples to have been declared a saint by the Catholic Church.

Devotion to Gallo has long continued to be strong in the neighbourhood where she lived, and of which she is the patroness saint. The residents credit her intercession with the little damage the sector endured during World War II, when over 100 bombs were dropped on it. Her home has been preserved as a chapel and museum.

Pope Pius IX, who canonized Gallo, declared her to be a patroness of expectant mothers and of women having difficulty conceiving. She is also the patroness of the Gallo World Family Foundation, which was founded to promote the development of Judeo-Christian values in the betterment of the world by members of the Gallo family scattered worldwide.

On 6 October 2001, her relics were transferred from the Church of Santa Lucia to the house where she had spent the last half of her life. It is now the Church of St. Mary Frances of the Five Wounds. It is still a common practice for expectant mothers to go there to be blessed with the relic. Many votive offerings from mothers who credit her with their successful deliveries are displayed in the sanctuary.
