= Dionisio Lazzari =

Italian sculptor (1617–1689)

Dionisio Lazzari (17 October 1617 – 9 August 1689) was an Italian sculptor and architect.

He was born in Naples in 1617, the son of Jacopo Lazzari and Caterina Papini. Jacopo was born in Florence, and his and Dionisio's work shows Tuscan influences. In Dionisio, these are combined with the style of the Neapolitan baroque, as exemplified by Cosimo Fanzago. One of Lazzari's pupils was Arcangelo Guglielmelli.

His characteristic work was in marble inlaid with different coloured precious stones, often in abstract designs, though he also produced naturalistic works of vases, flowers and putti.

== Main works ==
Most of the works of Dionisio Lazzari are found in Naples:

- 1642: Firrao chapel, San Paolo Maggiore
- 1654 (design): Church and Convent of the Girolamini
- 1662: Façade of San Lorenzo Maggiore (later redone by Ferdinando Sanfelice)
- 1646 (onwards): Multiple chapels and decorations of Naples Cathedral
- 1674 - 1691: Altar of San Teresa church
- Santa Maria di Montesanto, Naples

== Sources ==
- Di Maggio, Patrizia (1985). "Elementi toscani nella cultura decorativa napoletana del Seicento". Storia dell'arte (in Italian). 54: 133–139.
- Various authors (1998). Civiltà del Seicento a Napoli II (in Italian). Napoli: Electa. ISBN 88-435-8712-9.
