= Santa Maria del Rosario alle Pigne =

Church of Santa Maria del Rosario alle Pigne
- Chiesa di Santa Maria del Rosario alle Pigne
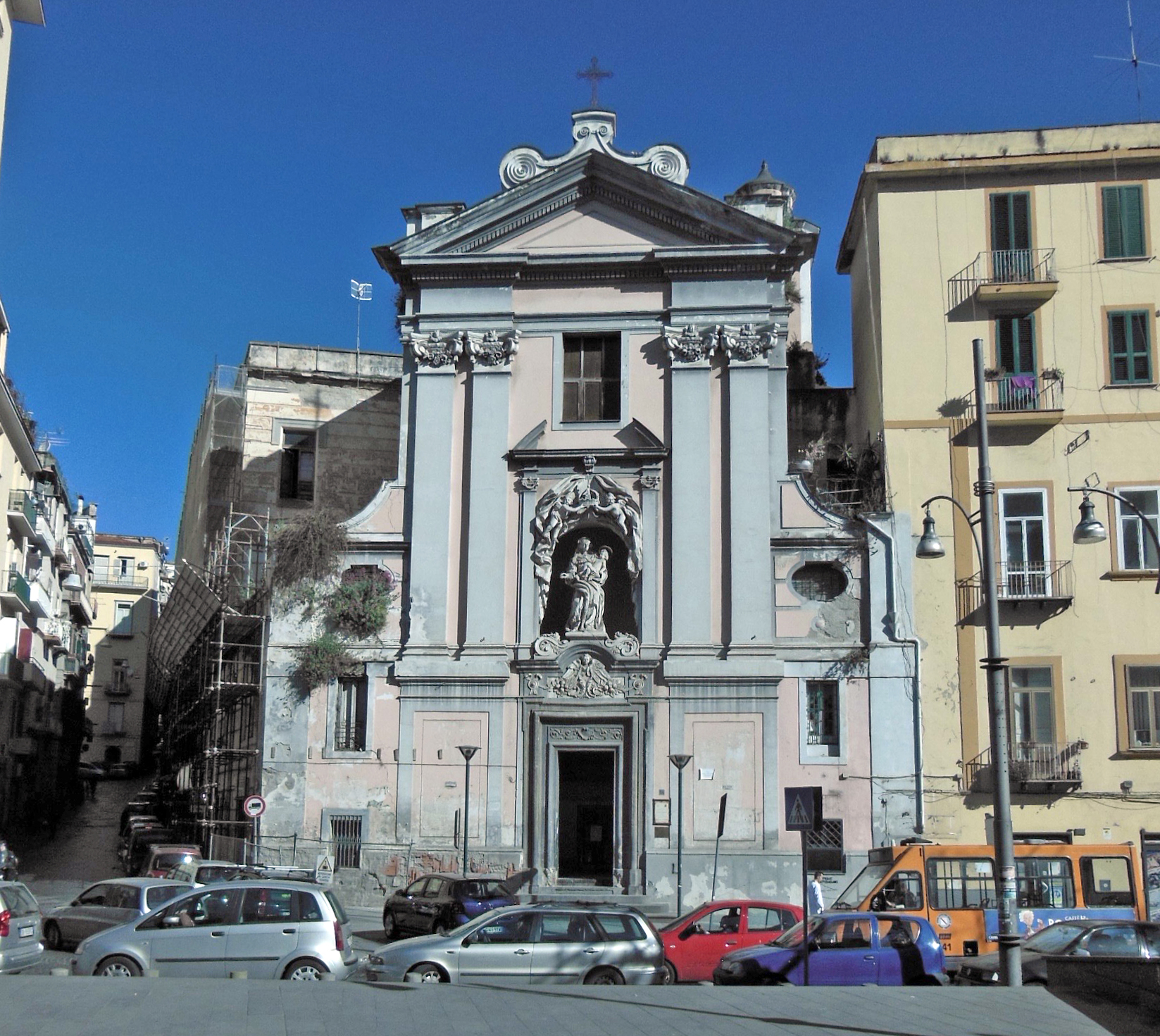
- The façade of Arcangelo Guglielmelli.
- Church of Santa Maria del Rosario alle Pigne
- 40.854960°N 14.253355°E
- Location: Piazza Cavour; Naples; Province of Naples, Campania
- Country: Italy
- Denomination: Roman Catholic

History
- Status: Active

Architecture
- Architectural type: Church
- Style: Baroque architecture

Administration
- Diocese: Roman Catholic Archdiocese of Naples

Santa Maria del Rosario alle Pigne (or del Rosariello) is a church located near Piazza Cavour in Naples, Italy.

== History ==
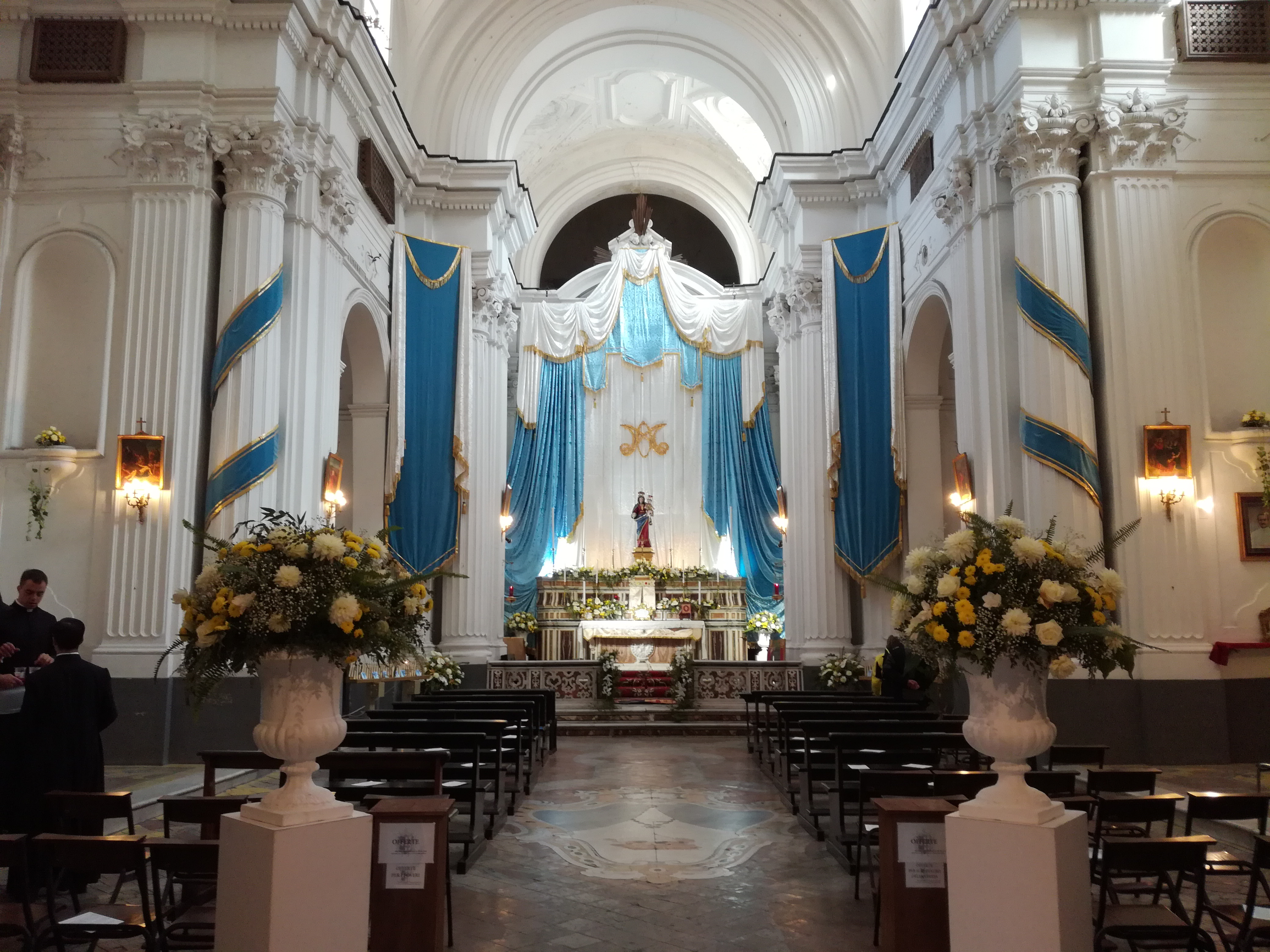
The interior

The church acquired its name, because in 1638, the zone where the church now stands was a pine forest. The trees were felled to build the convent on lands that belonged to the Moscabruno clan. Designs of the church were by Arcangelo Guglielmelli. It has a rectangular base with lateral chapels. The facade has a statue of the Virgin and Child by the artist. The cupola is built from tufa rock. The church has works by Luca Giordano. The adjacent cloister is built in a late Renaissance style.

The church was closed after the 1980 earthquake, barricaded by a high wall that kept it sealed at the entrance until 1997, when work was carried out to consolidate the structure, as well as to rebuild the facade and restore the church's interior, but it was never reopened to worship.

On 9 April 2017 (Palm Sunday), the Church was reopened to the sacred offices with the installation of the Canons of the Institute of Christ the King Sovereign Priest. Masses are said every day, in the Tridentine form, as established by Cardinal Crescenzio Sepe.

On 20 January 2021, the left side of the facade collapsed; no injuries were reported.

== Bibliography ==
- Vincenzo Regina, Le chiese di Napoli. Viaggio indimenticabile attraverso la storia artistica, architettonica, letteraria, civile e spirituale della Napoli sacra, Newton and Compton editor, Naples 2004.
