= Giovanni Cola di Franco =

16th and 17th century Italian architect

Giovanni Cola di Franco was an Italian Mannerist architect with documented activity between 1596 and 1621, mainly in Naples, where he was born and died. He collaborated with contemporary architects such as Francesco Grimaldi, Bartolomeo Picchiatti and Giovan Giacomo Di Conforto.

He was first a master builder for Giovan Battista Cavagna working on the Monte di Pietà chapel. In 1593 he was employed by Giovanni Leonardi, founder of the Chierici Regolari della Madre di Dio to build the Santuario della Madonna dell'Arco in Sant'Anastasia. The work on this project lasted until the first years of the seventeenth century.

Between 1596 and 1599 he rebuilt the Santa Maria La Nova Church where he re-used the structure of the previous building allowing the work to progress quickly.

He took part in a competition for the realization Royal Chapel of the Treasure of St. Januarius competing against Ceccardo Bernucci, Giovan Battista Cavagna, Giulio Cesare Fontana, Francesco Grimaldi, Michelangelo Naccherino, Dionisio Nencioni di Bartolomeo and Giovan Giacomo Di Conforto. The presented projects were judged by a commission in Rome with the designs by Cola di Falco and Grimaldi being preferred. During construction of the chapel Cola di Franco had the direction of the rustic part of the building site under the supervision of Grimaldi.

In 1616 he was on site of the church of San Carlo alle Mortelle where he replaced Giovanni Ambrogio Mazenta who designed the church. Between 1619 and 1630 he was an architect on the church of Purgatorio ad Arco. He was then employed with the supervision of Di Conforto on the realization of the church of Santa Maria Donnaregina Nuova and thanks to the work carried out he was given a chapel inside the church.

== Bibliography (in Italian) ==
- (in Italian) Francesco Abbate, Storia dell'arte nell'Italia meridionale: il Cinquecento, vol. 3, Roma, Donzelli Editore, 2001, ISBN 88-7989-653-9.
- (in Italian) Emilio Ricciardi, Il "Poggio delle Mortelle" nella storia dell'architettura napoletana", degree thesis in Storia dell'architettura e della città, 2006.
- (in Italian) Francesco Domenico Moccia and Dante Caporali (ed.), NapoliGuida. Tra luoghi e monumenti della città storica, Clean, 2001, ISBN 88-86701-87-X.
