= Giulio Cesare Fontana =

Italian architect and engineer

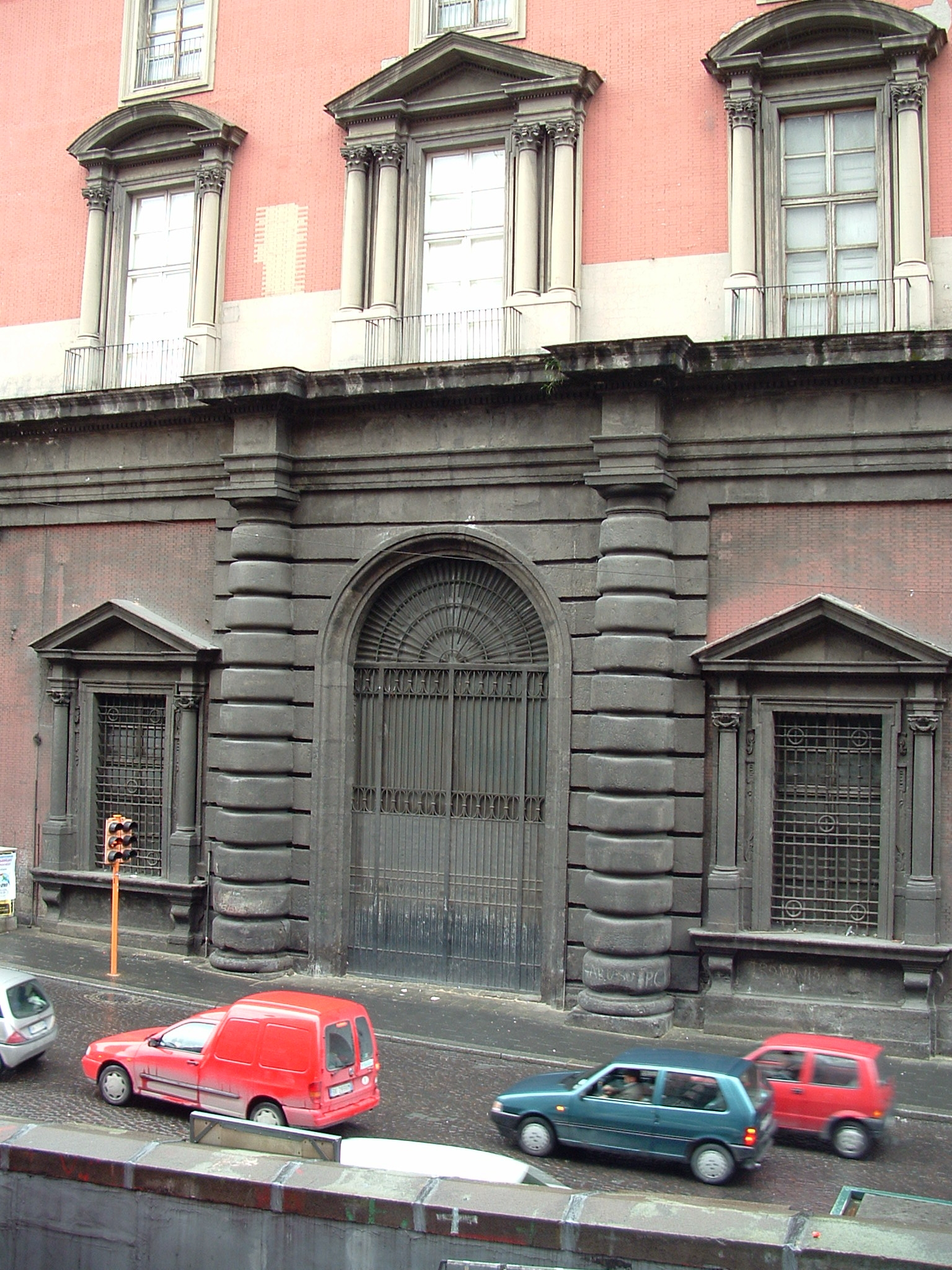
Original entrance to the first core of the Palazzo degli Studi

Giulio Cesare Fontana (12 February 1580, Rome - 9 June 1627, Naples) was an Italian architect and engineer, mainly active in Naples and its surroundings.

== Life ==
He was the son of Elisabetta Paduschi and her husband, the architect Domenico Fontana. He trained in the studios headed by his father, his uncle Giovanni Fontana, his cousin Carlo Maderno, Matteo Castelli and Girolamo Rainaldi. He and his father travelled to the Kingdom of Naples to design the Dogana nuova (1594) and the crypt of the Duomo di Salerno and the Duomo di Amalfi - Giulio Cesare was director of works on both these crypts until 1612. He also summoned Bartolomeo Picchiatti from Ferrara as a collaborator.

In 1607, following his father's death, he became chief royal architect of the Kingdom, restoring Castel Nuovo and leading work on the Palazzo Reale. That same year he took part in the competition to design the Royal Chapel of the Treasure of St. Januarius organised by the Deputazione della Real Cappella del Tesoro. Other competitors included Ceccardo Bernucci, Giovan Battista Cavagna, Francesco Grimaldi, Giovanni Cola di Franco, Michelangelo Naccherino, Dionisio Nencioni di Bartolomeo and Giovan Giacomo Di Conforto. A commission in Rome judged the competition and the designs by father Grimaldi and Giovanni Cola di Franco were declared the winning entries.

In 1612 viceroy Pedro Fernández de Castro, count of Lemos, commissioned him to convert the former cavallerizza into the Palazzo dei Regi Studi, which now houses the Museo Archeologico Nazionale di Napoli - nel frattempo operò nella sistemazione dei Regi Lagni. Around the same time he designed the grain pits in Largo Mercatello (now Piazza Dante) in Naples and worked on the Regi Lagni. In 1626 he designed the portale dell'Annunziata gateway in Aversa, took part in completing the oratory of San Carlo Borromeo near the church of Sant'Anna dei Lombardi - that church also contains the funerary monument to Domenico Fontana, designed by Giulio Cesare in 1627 but badly damaged during World War Two.
