= Giovan Battista Cavagna =

Italian painter

Giovanni Battista Cavagna, also known as Cavagni or Gavagni (c. 1545–1613) was an Italian architect, engineer, and painter, active mainly in Naples, but also in Rome and Marche.

== Life ==
Cavagna was born in Rome, c. 1545. While his year of birth is uncertain, it is recorded that he was of adult years by 1569 and living in Rome at that time. He had a son, Cosimo, who predeceased him and was buried in the cathedral of Loreto. He left a will dated 28 May 1609, which named his wife Margherita Fedele (or Fedeli) as his sole heir.

Dionisio Nencioni di Bartolomeo was one of his pupils.

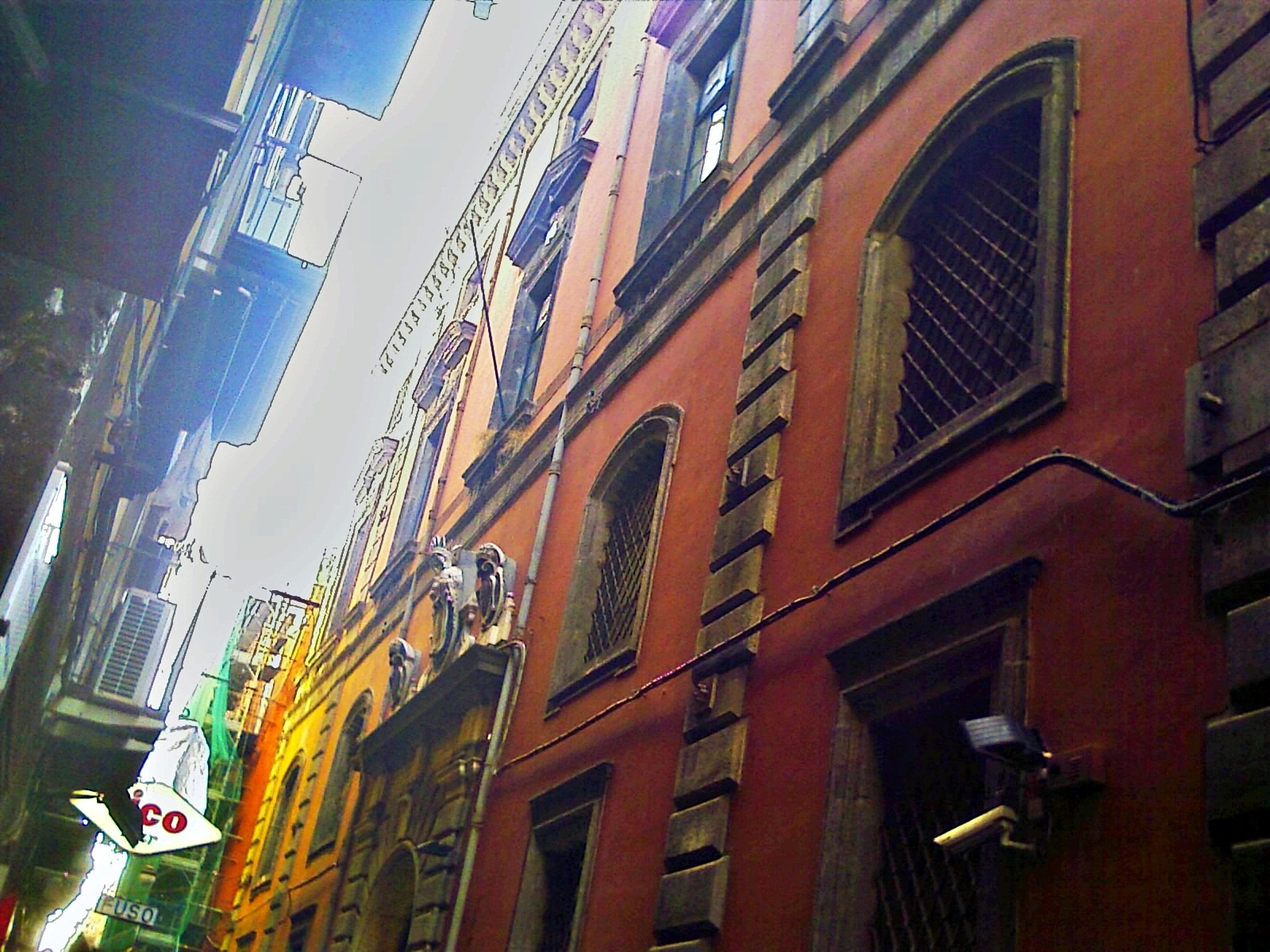
Monte di Pietà in Naples

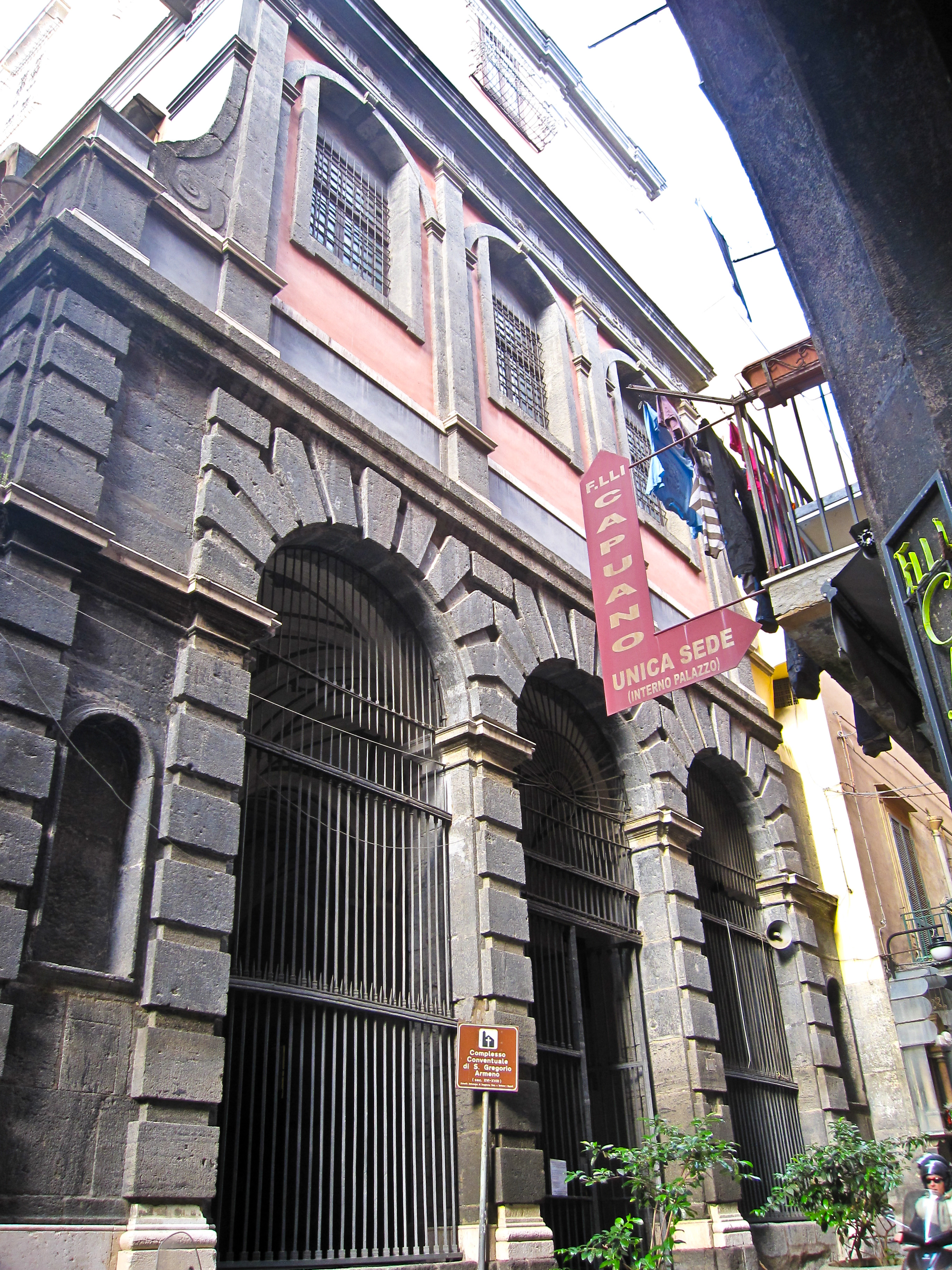
Facade of San Gregorio Armeno

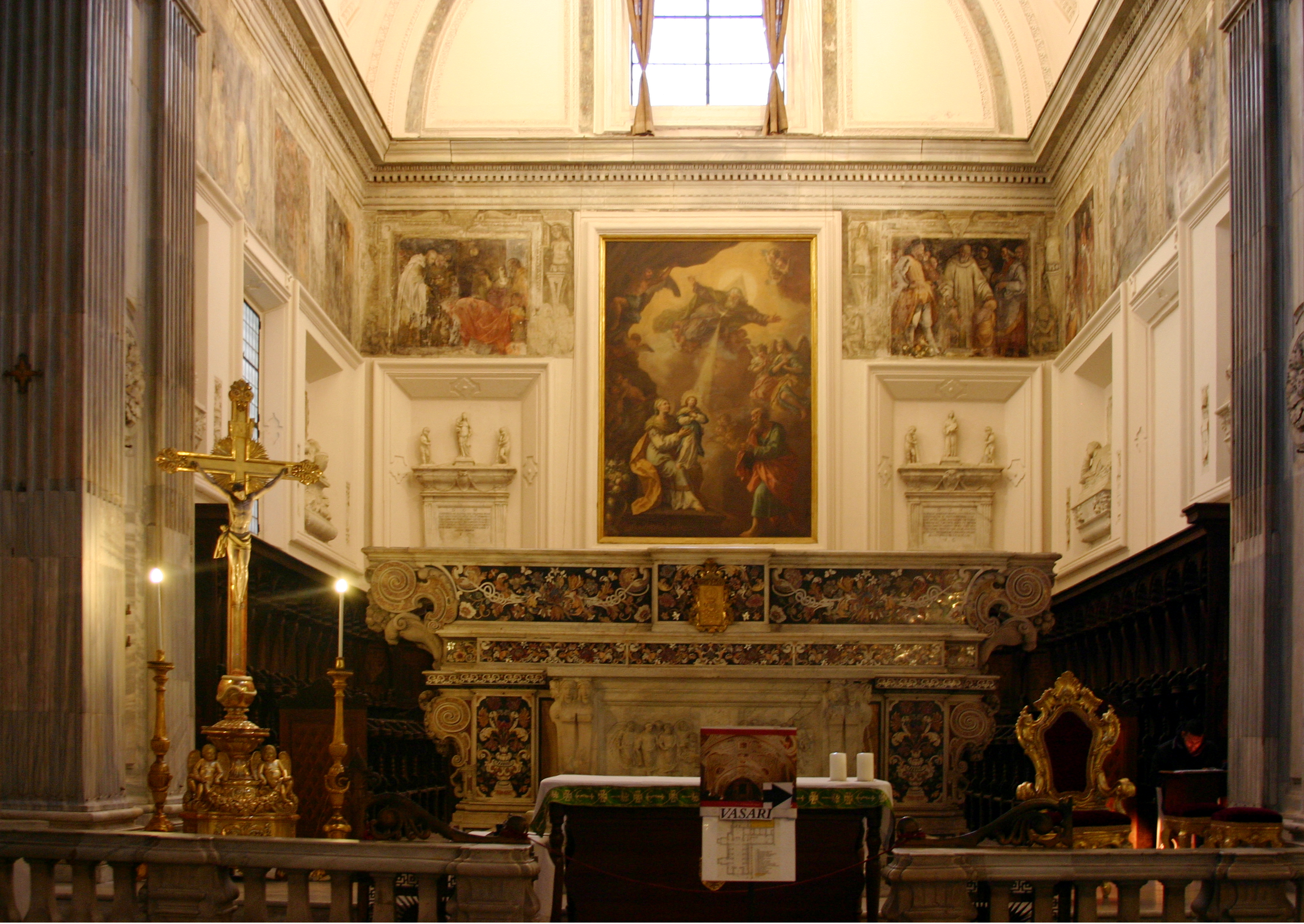
Apse of Sant'Anna dei Lombardi

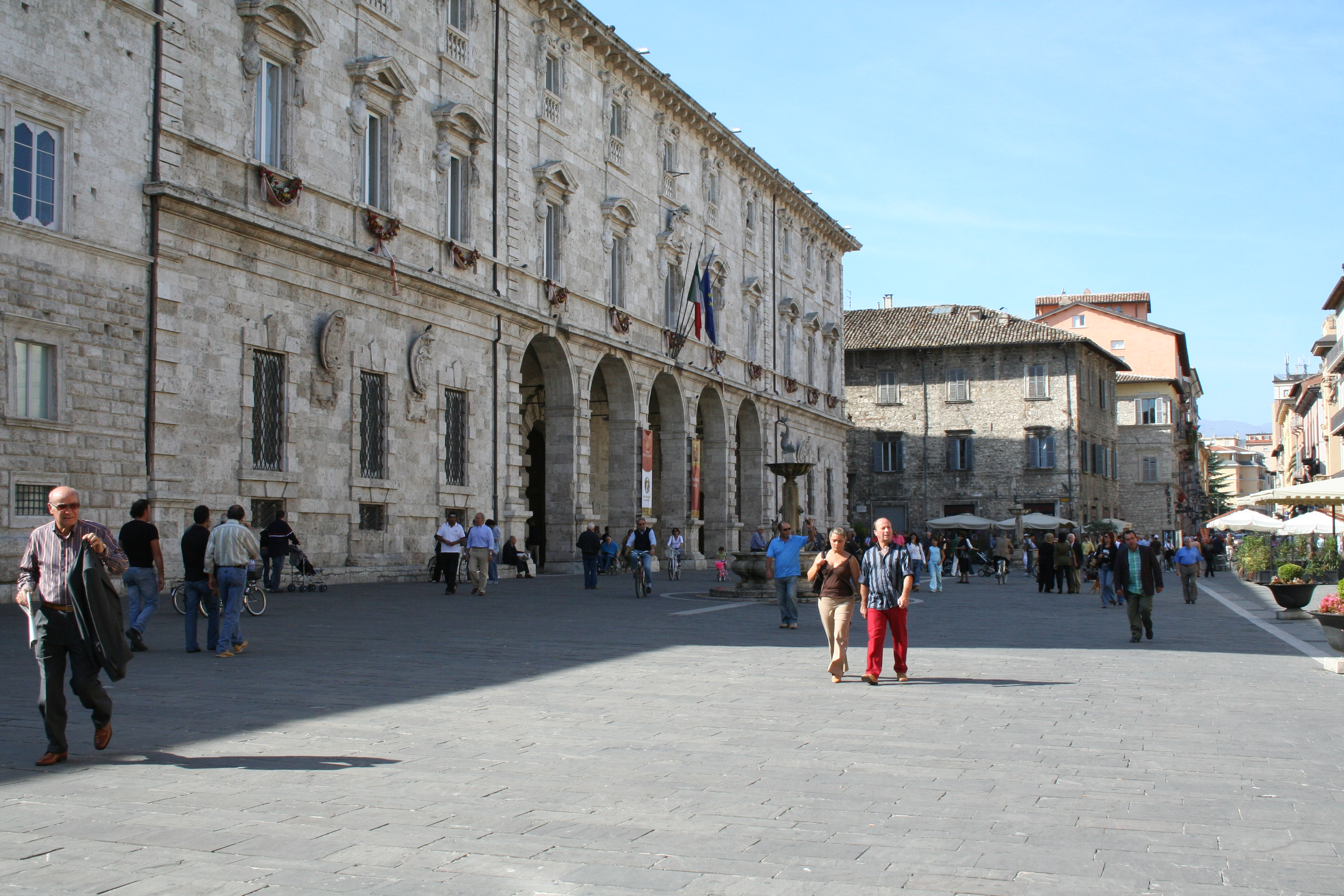
Facade of Palazzo dell'Arengo, Ascoli Piceno

== Works ==
In 1572–1577, he worked in Naples at the church of San Gregorio Armeno together with Giovanni Vincenzo della Monica. He helped design the Bank in Naples, called the second Monte di Pietà, started in 1539. (Note: According to Sasso, this bank was built in celebration of the expulsion of Jews engaged in supposed usury, thus purportedly "liberating" the citizens of Naples from their activity.) By 1597, the building was completed and unified all the banks in the city. In this project, he was aided by Giovanni Giacomo Di Conforto and Giovanni Cola di Franco.

Returning to Rome from Naples, Cavagna worked in the studio of Federico Zuccari and performed numerous frescoes. Once again in Naples in 1590, he designed several transition edifices from the Renaissance. For example, he helped complete the Muscettola chapel in the church of Santa Maria della Stella, now no longer extant. In 1591, he helped reconstruct the nave and apse of the church of Sant'Anna dei Lombardi. He also succeeded Francesco Grimaldi as director of the construction of San Paolo Maggiore.

From 1598 to 1599 he helped design the Cappella del Tesoro in the Basilica of the Santissima Annunziata Maggiore, Naples. In these years, he criticised his rival, Domenico Fontana, a later arrival to Naples, of selecting a poor site for construction the Royal Palace. His disappointment in not winning this commission may have been Cavanga's reason for relocating to Loreto.

Cavagna renovated Santa Caterina, an ancient church in Fabriano. (Note: According to Livia Carloni, writing for the Metropolitan Museum of Art: "Two nearby and important churches were under renovation at Fabriano at this time. The ancient church of Santa Caterina ... was renovated by the Roman architect Giovanni Battista Cavagna between 1608 and 1613 (the year of his death). Cavagna was closely connected with Oratorian circles and was the architect of the church San Pietro Valle in Fano, and of the Santa Casa in Loreto.") He had been the architect of San Pietro in Valle, Fano and of the Sanctuary of Loreto.

In 1601–1602, he was also entrusted the construction of the grain stores. In 1607, he participated in a contest to design the Reale Cappella del Tesoro di San Gennaro, competing against Ceccardo Bernucci, Giulio Cesare Fontana, Francesco Grimaldi, Giovanni Cola di Franco, Michelangelo Naccherino, Dionisio Nencioni di Bartolomeo, and Giovan Giacomo Di Conforto. The architects Grimaldi e Giovanni Cola di Franco submitted the winning design. In 1610, he was active in Ascoli Piceno, and provided designs for the Oratorian church of San Pietro in Valle in the town of Fano in the Marche. He died and is buried in Loreto.
