= Santi Apostoli, Naples =

Church of Santi Apostoli
- Chiesa dei Santi Apostoli
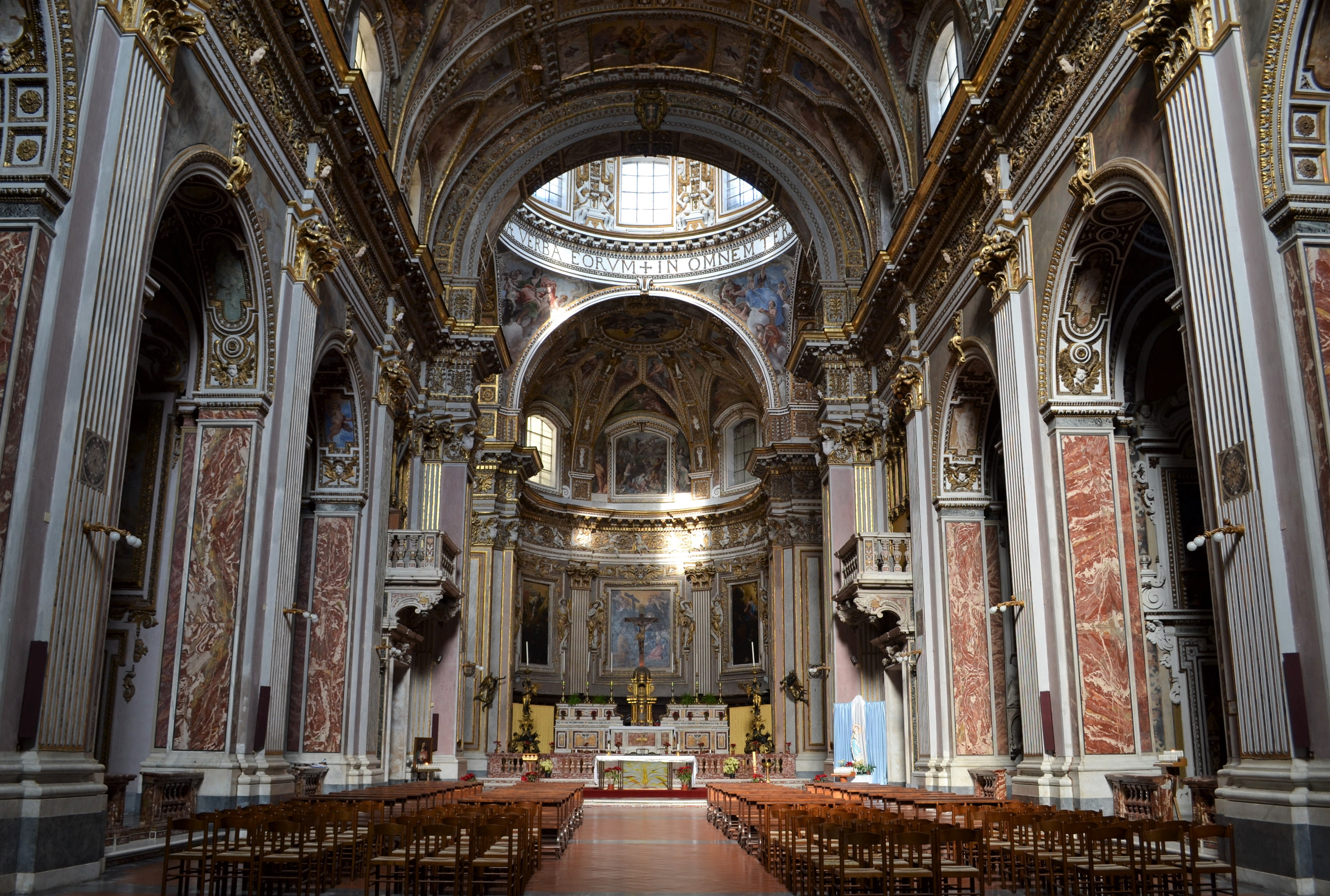
- Nave
- Church of Santi Apostoli
- 40.854557°N 14.260346°E
- Location: Via Anticaglia; Naples; Province of Naples, Campania
- Country: Italy
- Denomination: Roman Catholic

History
- Status: Active

Architecture
- Architectural type: Church
- Style: Baroque architecture
- Groundbreaking: 468

Administration
- Diocese: Roman Catholic Archdiocese of Naples

Santi Apostoli is a Baroque-style church in Naples, Italy.

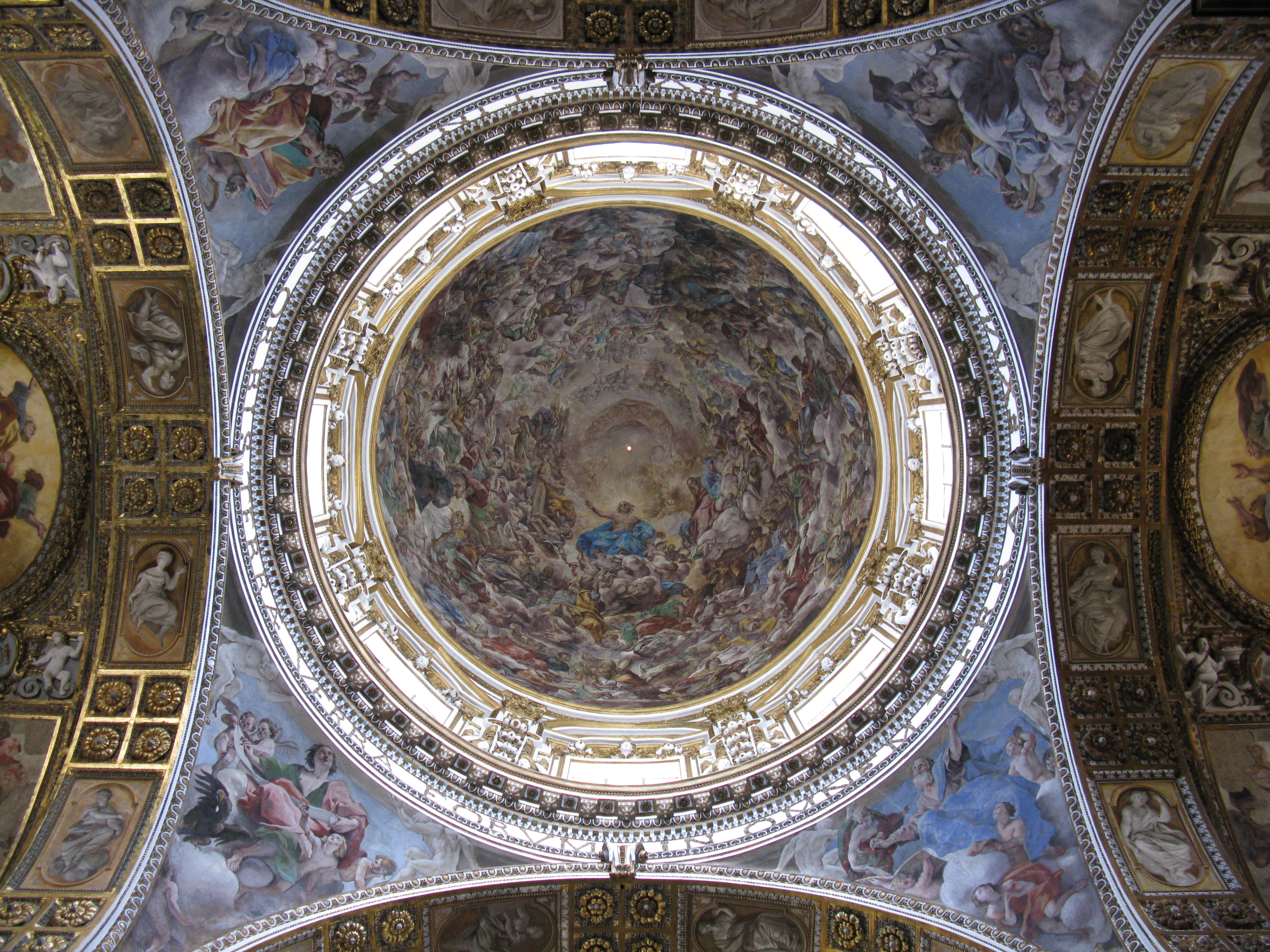
Cupola.

Legend holds that a church at the site was built atop a Temple of Mercury by Emperor Constantine. Restored by the Caracciolo Family, it was ceded in 1570 to the Theatine Order. By 1590, the adjacent cloister and monastery was designed by Francesco Grimaldi. In the early 17th century was reconstructed by Giacomo Conforti. In 1638, the work was continued by Bartolomeo Picchiatti. In the 19th century, the Theatine order was suppressed and the church turned over in administrations. An earthquake damaged the dome. The church now belongs to the Liceo Artistico Statale di Napoli.

The counter-facade and ceiling panels were frescoed by Giovanni Lanfranco in the 1640s. The panels contain the following depictions: a Martyrdom of Apostles Simone e Giuda; a Martyrdom of St Thomas Apostle; a Martyrdom of St Bartholomew; a Martyrdom of St Matthew; a Martyrdom of St John Evangelist; a Glory of the Apostles, Virtue, Prophets, Patriarchs, and finally the four Evangelists on the pendentives of the dome.

The cupola has a large fresco depicting Paradise (1684) by Giovanni Battista Benasca, who also painted the frescoes in the chapel of St Michael. This chapel has a painting by Marco da Siena The lunnettes in this chapel were painted by Giordano and Solimena. Over the main door is a painting of the Healing Pool by Viviani. The main altar was designed by Fuga. In the choir are five canvases by Solimena. The altar in the Filomarino Family Chapel at the right of the main altar, was designed (1647) by Borromini. The chapel has mosaics made by Giovanni Battista Calandra and copied from paintings by Reni. The relief on the altar of the four evangelist symbols is by François Duquesnoy, and two marble lions are by Giuliano Finelli. The sacristy was built in 1626 using designs of Ferdinando Sanfelice. The crypt was frescoed by Belisario Corenzio.

== Sources ==
- Vasi, Giovanni Battista de; Ferrari, Mariano (1826). Nuova guida di Napoli, dei contorni di Procida, Ischia e Capri, Compilata su la Guida del Vasi, Prima Edizione. Naples: Tipografia de Porcelli.
- Portions derived from Italian Wikipedia entry.
