= Bartolomeo Picchiatti =

Italian engineer and architect

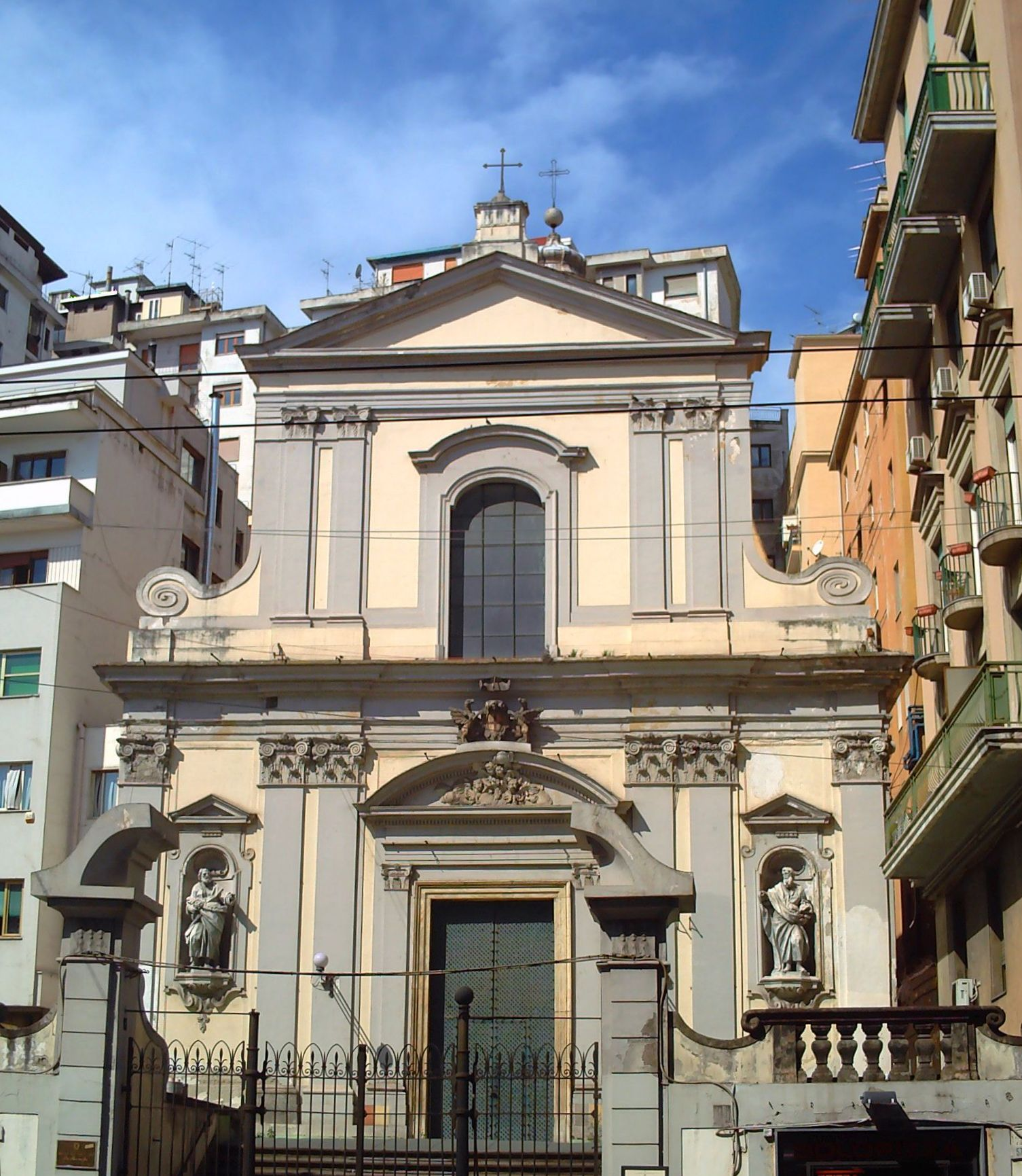

Bartolomeo Picchiatti (Ferrara, 1571 – Naples, 3 April 1643) was an Italian engineer and architect. A short street in the Soccavo area of the city is named after him.

== Life ==
He moved to Naples in 1593, having been summoned by the architect Domenico Fontana to be his assistant. He assisted Domenico and Giulio Cesare Fontana in the completion of works left incomplete by Giulio on his departure for Spain. He took charge of the excavating the Regi Lagni, planned by Fontana but only begun in the 17th century, before in 1634 the engineer Tommaso Alappio (? – ?, 23 August 1646) took over overall control whilst Picchiatti continued to direct the building site. In 1654 the Congregazione dei Nobili put Picchiatti in charge of designing and building the Palazzo Monte dei Poveri Vergognosi. Three years later he had a son, Francesco Antonio Picchiatti, who also became an architect and assisted his father in the last years of his life.

In 1620 Bartolomeo completed San Giorgio dei Genovesi and in 1621 designed the gateway to Palazzo di Sangro (constructed by Giuliano Finelli) and the small Santuario della Madonna dell'Arco. 1621 also saw him inherit the building site for San Carlo alle Mortelle - he also went on to design its college and thus became a trusted architect for the Barnabites. Following Giulio Cesare Fontana's death in 1627 he also took over as official engineer to the royal court, a post his son also later assumed. In 1632 he and Cosimo Fanzago rebuilt Pozzuoli Cathedral in Rione Terra. In 1638 he worked on the church of Santi Apostoli, designing its elegant two-colour bell-tower. That year he also worked on the building of Santa Maria della Stella.

In 1641 he and his son jointly designed the Basilica of Sant'Agostino alla Zecca. He also restored Santa Maria Donnalbina at an unknown date. He died in 1643 and all his outstanding projects were assigned to Onofrio Antonio Gisolfi, who until 1656 took over the role of royal engineer.

== Bibliography (in Italian) ==
- Francesco Domenico Moccia e Dante Caporali, NapoliGuida-Tra Luoghi e Monumenti della città storica, Clean, 2001
- Aurelio De Rose, I Palazzi di Napoli. Storia, curiosità e aneddoti che si tramadano da secoli su questi straordinari testimoni della vita partenopea, Newton e Compton editori, Napoli, 2004.
- Napoli e Dintorni, TCI, 2007
