= Michelangelo Naccherino =

Italian sculptor and architect

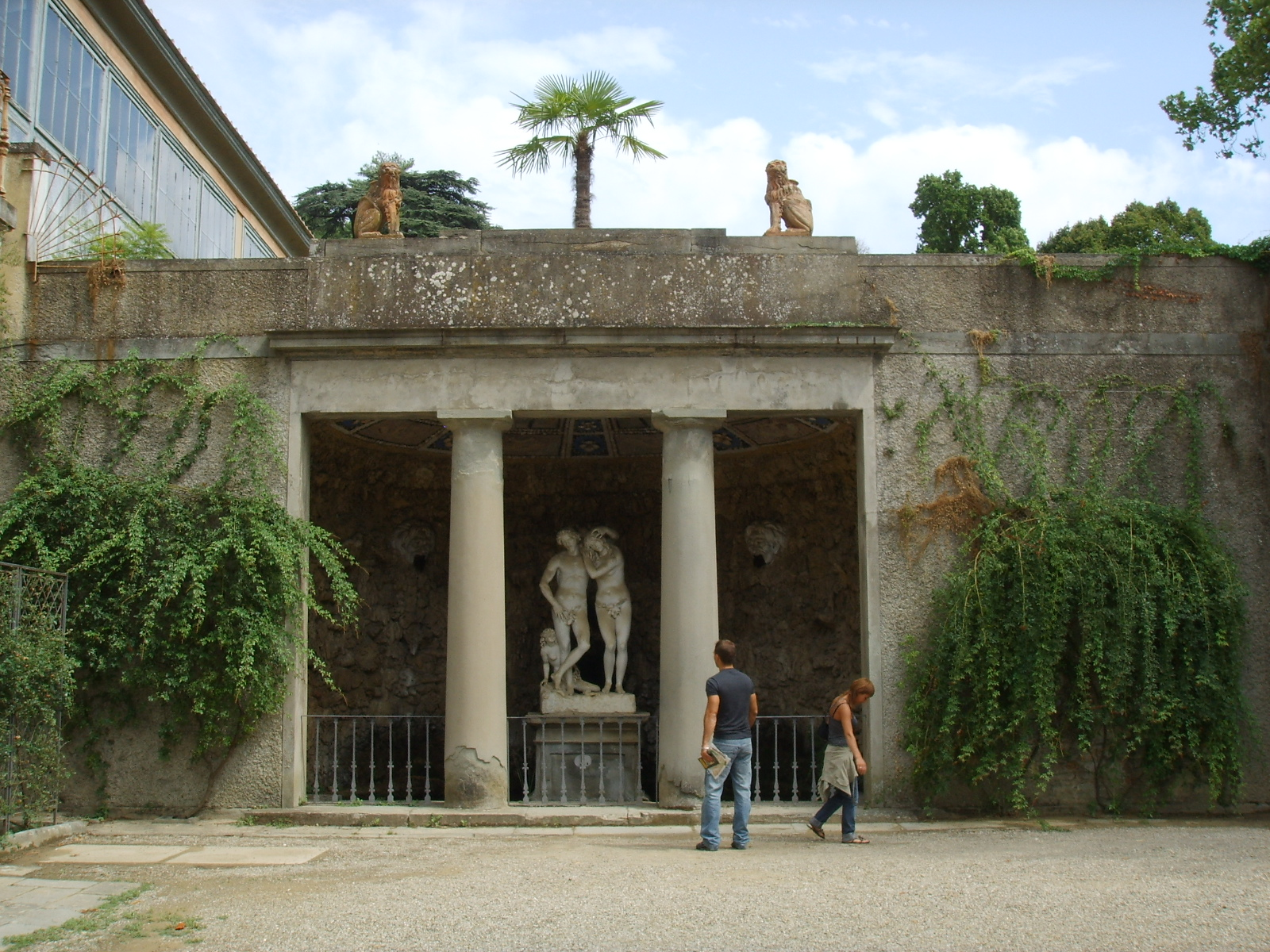
Grotto of Adam and Eve in Boboli Gardens

Michelangelo Naccherino (6 March 1550 – February 1622) was an Italian sculptor and architect, active mainly in the Kingdom of Naples, Italy.

== Life ==
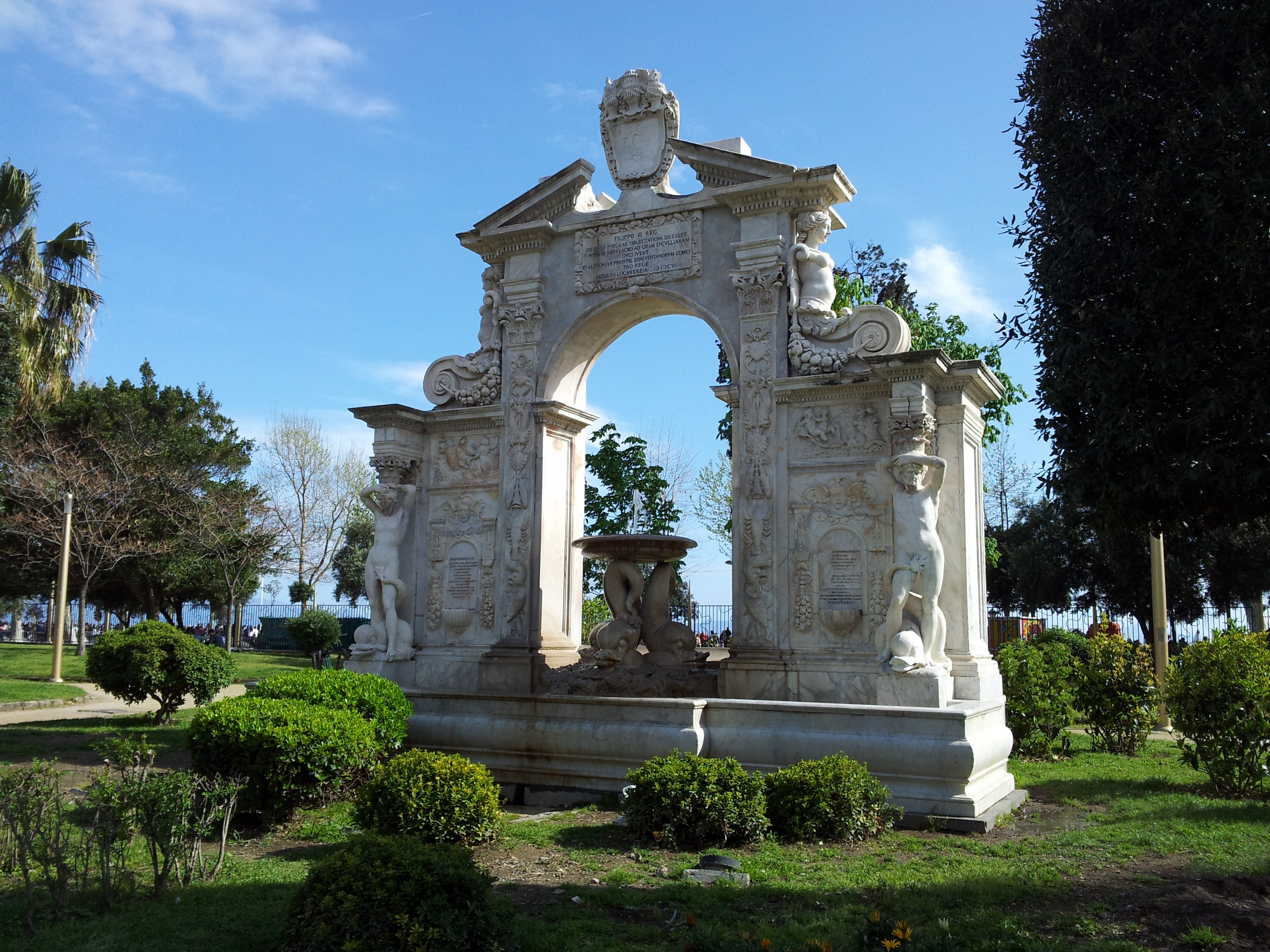
Fontana di Santa Lucia

Naccherino was born on 6 March 1550 in Florence. He supposedly was a pupil of Giambologna in Florence, but due to disagreements moved to the Kingdom of Naples in 1573. From 1575 to 1577, he was active in Palermo, where he worked alongside Camillo Camilliani in the construction of the Fontana Pretoria, a project of Francesco Camilliani.

Returning to Naples, he completed a number of Mannerist projects such as the tomb of Alfonso Sanchez (1588–1589) in the Basilica of Santissima Annunziata Maggiore and a crucifix (1599) for the church of San Carlo all'Arena. He also completed a Madonna della Sanità for the church of Santa Maria della Sanità in the zone of Materdei, where he lived.

In the early 1600s, he participated in a variety of projects, including the Fontana di Santa Lucia and the Fontana del Gigante (along with Pietro Bernini). In 1607, he submitted a design for the Cappella del Tesoro di San Gennaro, in which he competed against Ceccardo Bernucci, Giovan Battista Cavagna, Giulio Cesare Fontana, Giovan Giacomo Di Conforto, Dionisio Nencioni di Bartolomeo, Francesco Grimaldi, and Giovanni Cola di Franco. The latter two won the competition.

In 1612, he completed some tombs in the church of Santo Stefano in Capri, and in 1616, he returned to Florence to sculpt an Adam and Eve for the Boboli Gardens. Among those who worked with him were Giuliano Finelli, Francesco Cassano, Tommaso Montani, Angelo Landi, and Mario Marasi.

Other works include:

- Pietà, Chapel of Palazzo of Monte di Pietà
- Fontana di Santa Lucia (Villa Reale)
- Fontana del Gigante (con Pietro Bernini)
- Statue, Fontana del Nettuno
- Madonna del Carmine, San Giovanni a Carbonara
- Bust of Fabrizio Pignatelli, Church of Santissima Trinità dei Pellegrini
- Christ Risen, Certosa di San Martino
- Tomb of Ferdinando Maiorca, Pontificia Reale Basilica of San Giacomo degli Spagnoli, Naples
- Christ at the Column, Museo Lázaro Galdiano, Madrid, Spain
- Virgin and Child, Jesus Nazareno church, Cudillero, Spain
- Funerary statue of García de Barrionuevo (bronze), San Ginés church, Madrid, Spain

He died in February 1622 in Naples.

== Bibliography ==
- Antonino Maresca di Serracapriola, Sulla vita e sulle opere di Michelangelo Naccherino: appunti, Francesco Giannini & figli, Naples 1890
- Antonino Maresca di Serracapriola, Michelangelo Naccherino scultore fiorentino allievo di Giambologna: sua vita, sue opere, opere del suo aiuto Tomaso Montani e del principale suo allievo Giuliano Finelli: con ventinove autotipie, tipo-ed. meridionale anonima T.E.M.A., Naples 1924
- Francesco Cibarelli, La Chiesa di San Carlo all'Arena e il Cristo del Naccherino, Francesco Giannini & figli, Naples 1926
- Franco Strazzullo, Sul crocefisso marmoreo di Michelangelo Naccherino, Archivio Storico Napoletano, Naples 1952
- Michael Kuhlemann, Michelangelo Naccherino: Skulptur zwischen Florenz und Neapel um 1600, Waxmann, Münster 1999, ISBN 3893257322 (in German)
