= Dionisio Nencioni di Bartolomeo =

Italian architect

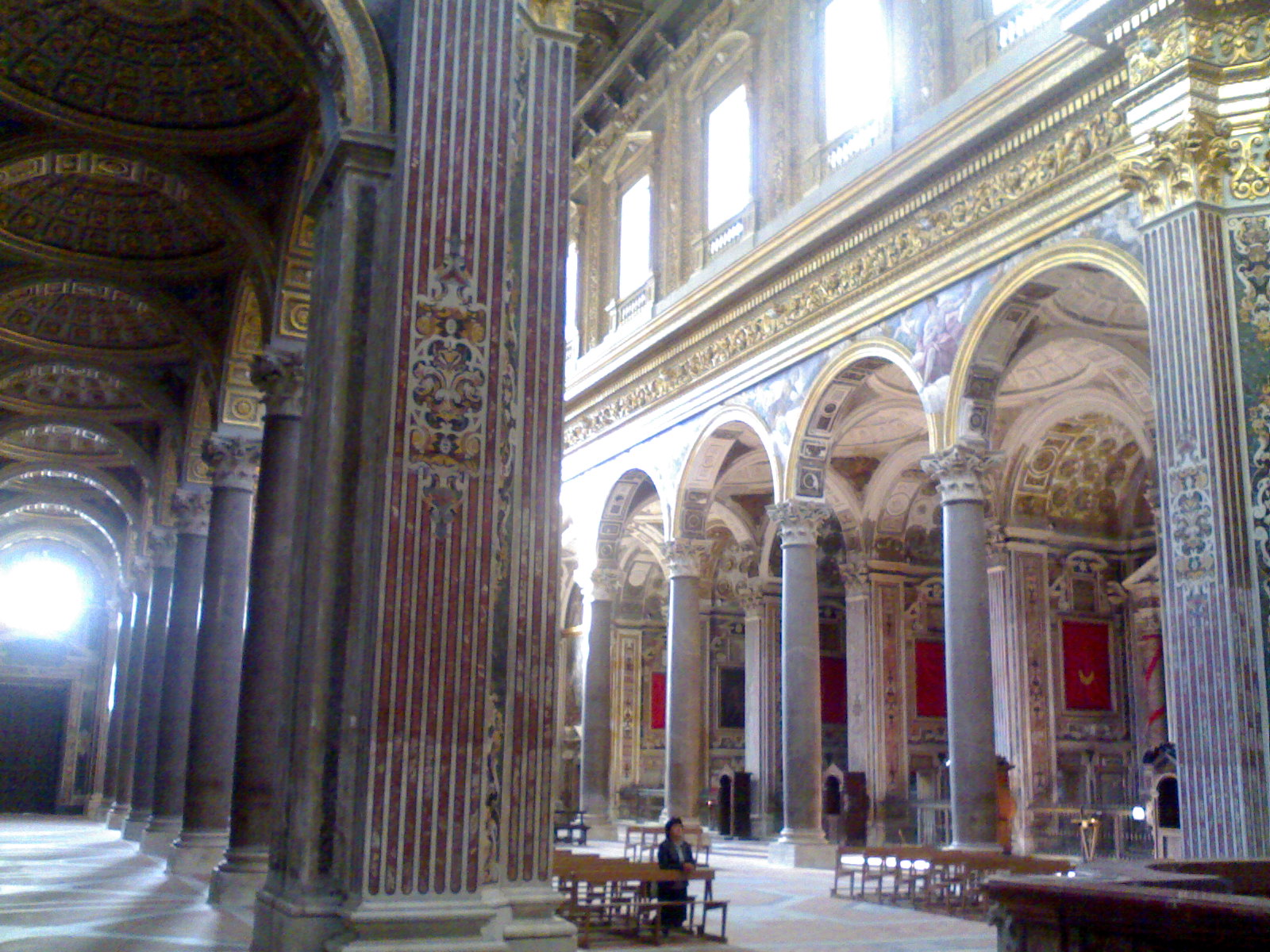
Interior of the Girolamini church

Dionisio Nencioni di Bartolomeo (1559, Florence - 1638, Naples) was an Italian architect, mainly active in Naples, to which he moved in 1584. He worked on the Hieronymite church from 1587 until his death, in collaboration with Giovanni Antonio Dosio.

In 1607 he took part in the competition to design the Royal Chapel of the Treasure of St. Januarius, alongside other architects working in Naples such as Francesco Grimaldi, Giovan Battista Cavagna, Giulio Cesare Fontana, Michelangelo Naccherino, Giovan Giacomo Di Conforto, Giovanni Cola di Franco and Ceccardo Bernucci, but his design did not win. In 1612 he worked on the Gesù e Maria Complex and from 1604 to 1632 as one of the architects of San Giuseppe dei Ruffi. In 1631 he made some assessments of the work already done at certosa di San Martino. He spent his final years completing work on the Gerolamini church (even joining the Hieronymites himself in 1637), which was only completed in 1639.
