= Picchiatti =

Picchiatti is an Italian surname. Notable people with this name include the following:

- Bartolomeo Picchiatti (1571–1643), Italian architect and engineer
- Francesco Antonio Picchiatti (1619–1694), Italian architect of the Baroque era

== See also ==
- Picchiatello
- Picchiotti
