= Monte di Pietà, Naples =

Coordinates: 40.848900°N 14.257711°E

The Palazzo of Monte di Pietà is a historic building located along the lower decumanus (East-West road) of Naples, Italy. The lower decumanus is also known as Spaccanapoli street. It housed the Mount of Piety or Christian bank in Naples.

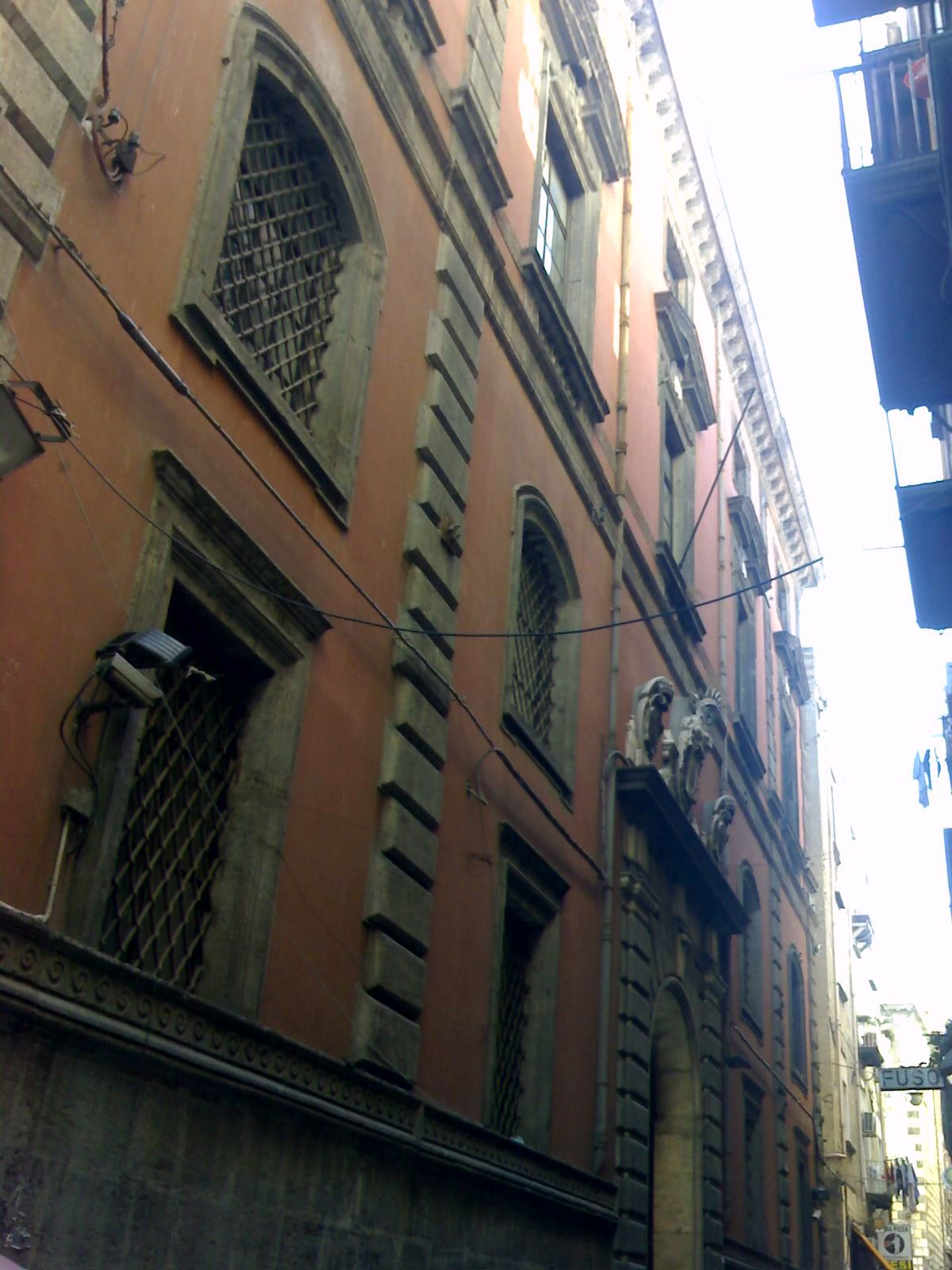
Façade

== History ==
The Monte di Pietà was founded in 1539, after Emperor Charles V issued an edict to expel the Jews devoted to usury. Medieval Christians were prohibited by the church from lending money at a profit, although this injunction was often ignored in the commercial centers of the peninsula. In response to the 1539 edict, some aristocratic Neapolitans (Aurelio Paparo, Gian Domenico di Lega, and Leonardo Palma) created a non-profit organization to lend money.

In 1574, the merchant Bernardino Rota left in his will a sum of five hundred ducats to Monte di Pietà. It was established a brotherhood for the management of a pawnshop that in 1592 had as the first venue, the Palazzo Carafa d'Andria, but lack of space them to purchase for a new home, the palace of Girolamo Carafa.

Between 1597 and 1603, Gian Battista Cavagna, with the collaboration of Giovanni Giacomo Di Conforto and Giovanni Cola di Franco, built the palace with an adjacent Mannerist style chapel. During the uprising of Masaniello, the intercession of Giulio Genoino spared the palace from arson by the revolutionaries. In 1786, an accidental fire destroyed the archives and artwork of the Bank; the chapel, however, escaped the fire.

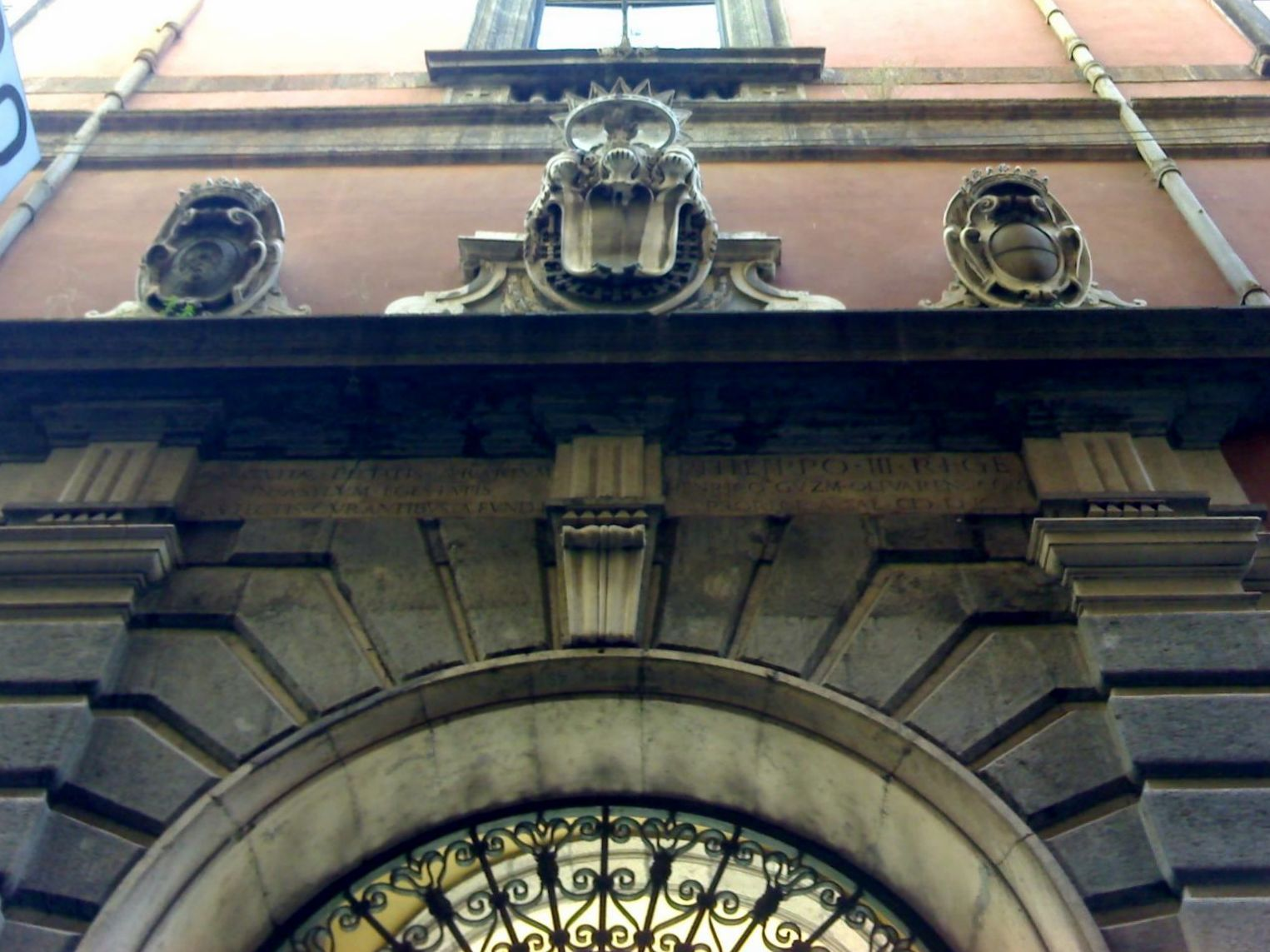
Detail of the entrance

The portal has Doric order columns. In the entablature you enter three triglyphs that create two empty spaces in the frieze, in these empty spaces are placed two inscriptions, one of which is the date of commencement of work:

For prefects who work with selfless devotion exchequer, and hospice for the poor

— GRATUITAE pietatis aerarium IN ASILUM EGESTATIS
PRAEFECTIS CURANTIBUS

Under the government of Philip III and the vice-royalty of Enrique de Guzmán Olivares in the year of the Lord 1599

— PHILIPPO III REGE Henrico GUZM . OLIVARES COM.
PRO REGE A. SAL. MDIC

The facade of the chapel was inspired by the façade of the Sant'Andrea in Via Flaminia, designed Vignola. Flanking the entrance, between two pairs of pilasters of Ionic order there are two niches with statues of Pietro Bernini, the father of the famous Roman sculptor Gian Lorenzo, representing Charity and Security. In the tympanum, is the Pietà by Michelangelo Naccherino with two angels of Tommaso Montani.

== The chapel ==
The chapel vault was frescoed by the Greek painter Belisario Corenzio and on the right is a painting by Ippolito Borghese, on the left a painting begun by Girolamo Imparato and completed by Fabrizio Santafede, and in the center, behind the high altar, the Deposition by Santafede. The tomb of Cardinal Acquaviva (1617) by Cosimo Fanzago is in the antisacristy. The sacristy was decorated in the first half of the 18th century with gilt-frame allegoric frescoes by Giuseppe Bonito on the ceiling. On the right a door leads to the Hall of Cantoniere, another example of 17th-century art, with tiled floor and frescoes; are noteworthy portraits of Charles III of Bourbon and his wife Maria Amalia. Also in the room is also kept a wooden Pietà from the 17th century by Naccherino.

== Interior of the chapel ==
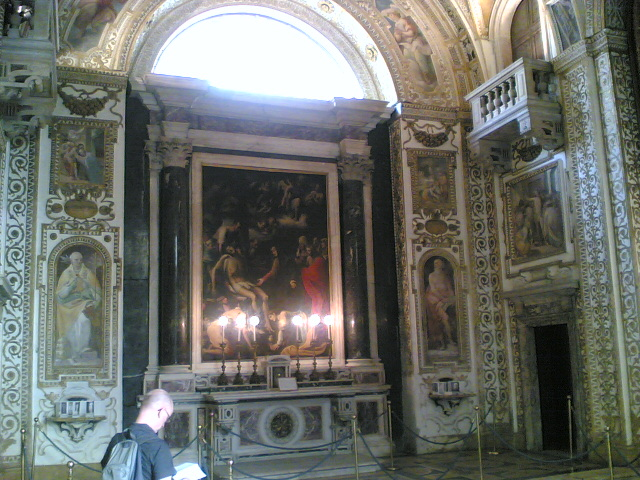
Interior

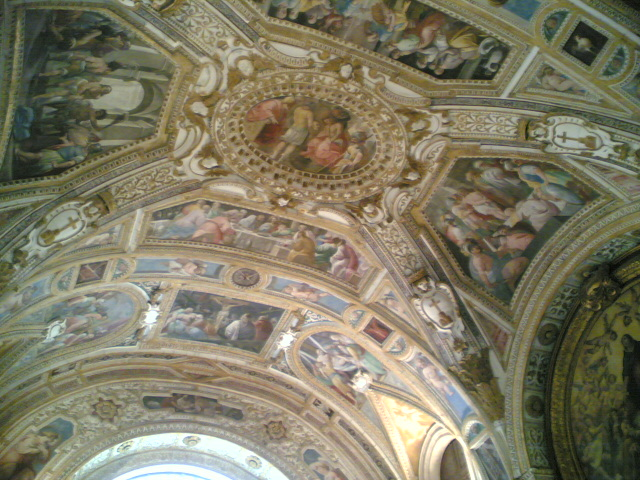
Frescoes

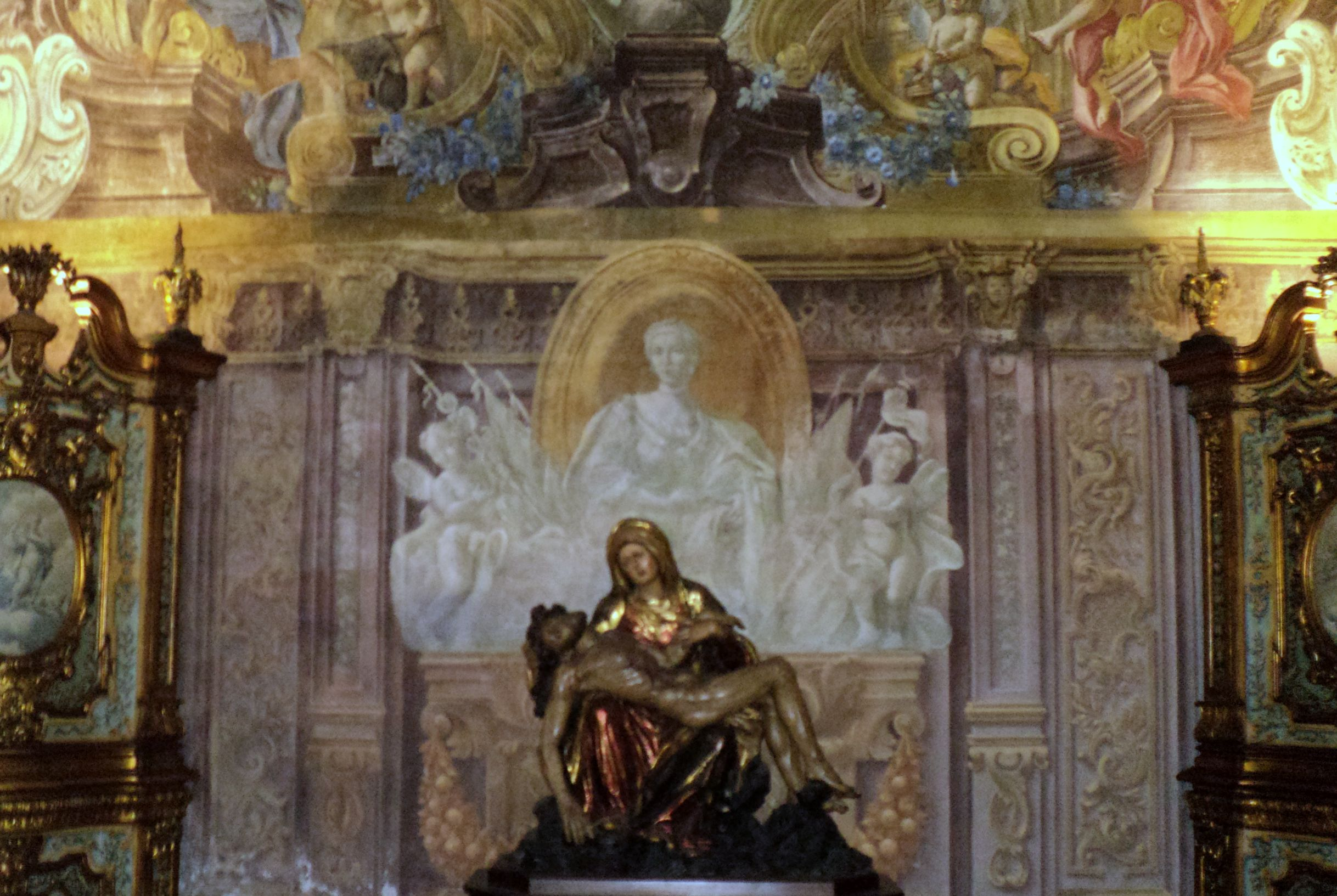
Pietà by Naccherino

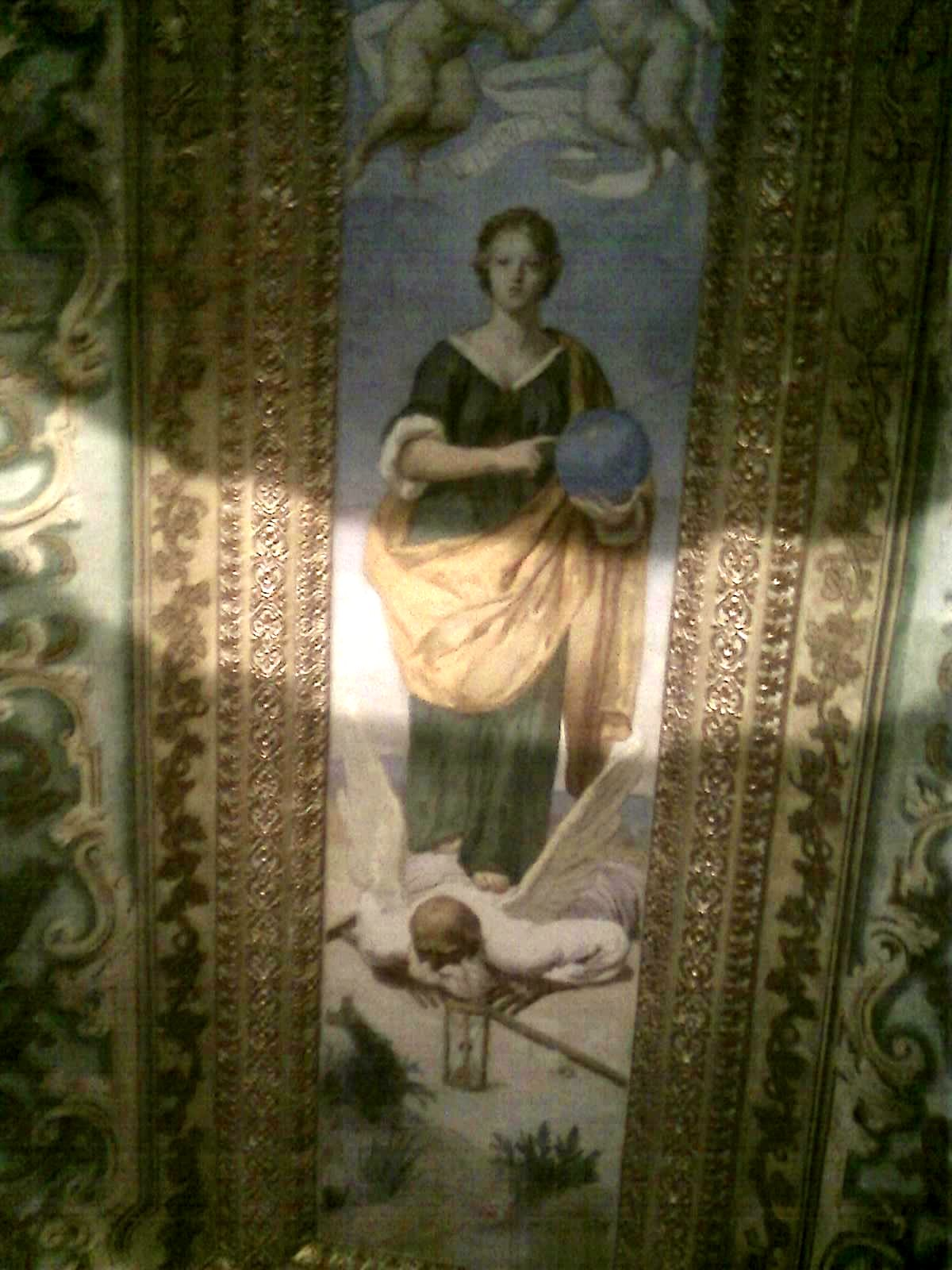
Frescoes

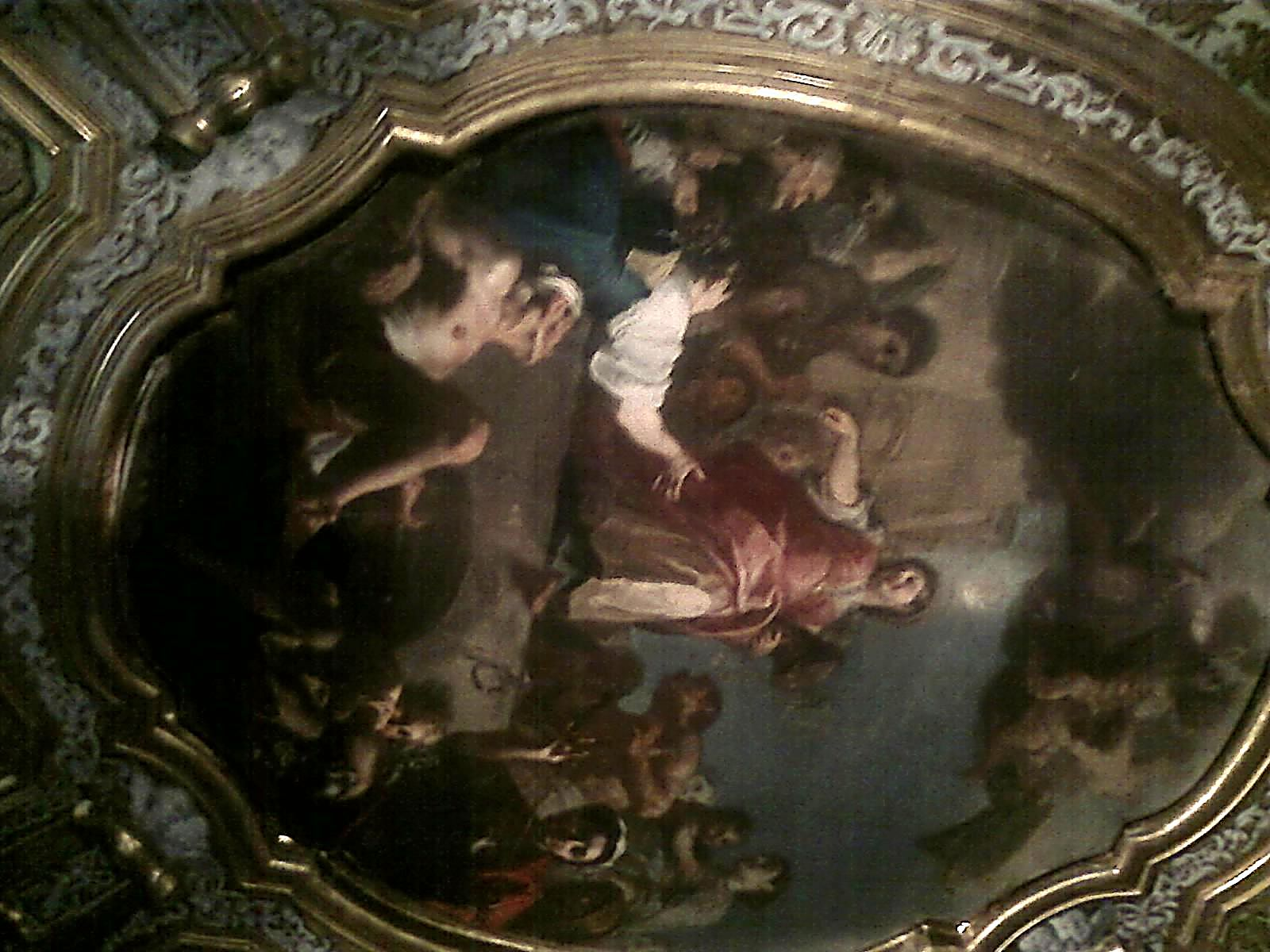
Frescoes by Bonito.

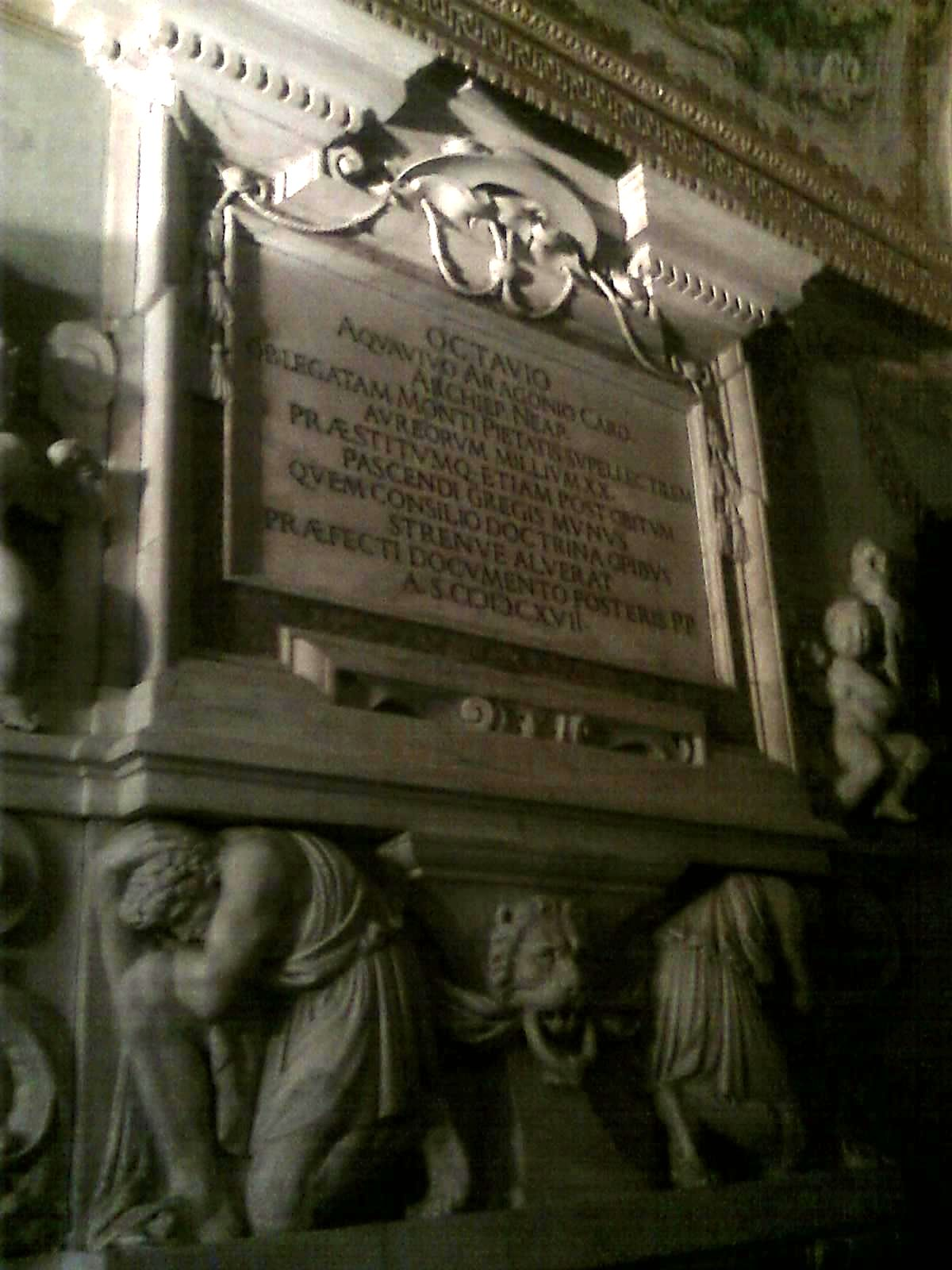
Tomb of Cardinal Acquaviva by Fanzago

== See also ==
- List of banks in Italy
