= San Paolo, Macerata =

Church in Macerata, Italy

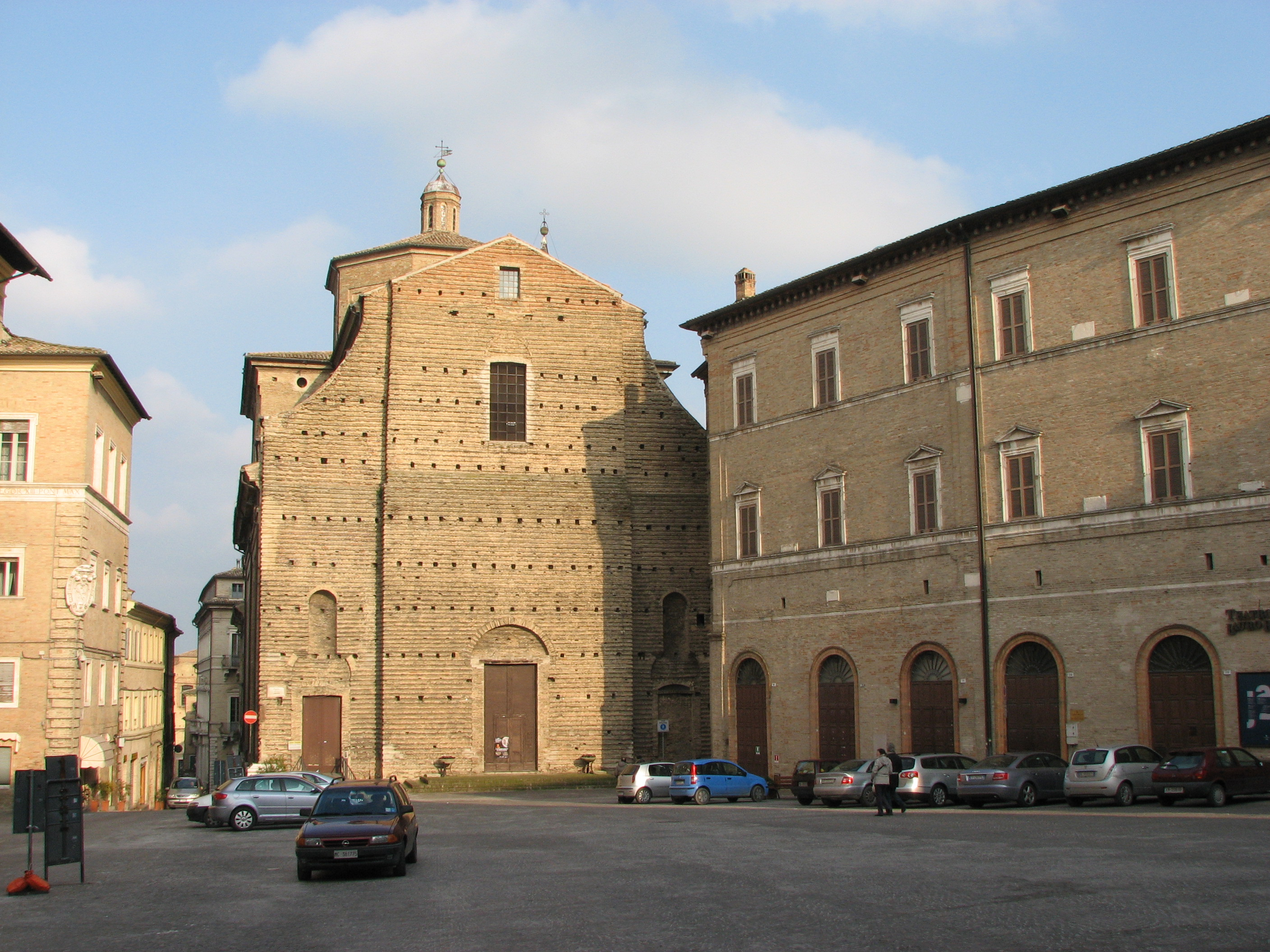
- San Paolo, Macerata
- 43°18′01″N 13°27′14″E
- Location: Macerata, Italy
- Denomination: Roman Catholic

Santo Paolo is a deconsecrated Roman Catholic church located on Piazza della Libertà, in the town Macerata, region of Marche, Italy.

== History ==
A church at the site was designed by the Barnabite order priest Giovanni Ambrogio Mazenta of Milan, and built during 1623-1655. The brick exterior, with a tall façade, is unfinished and almost entirely lacking decoration. The interior has a single nave illuminated by windows in the cupola. The cupola was frescoed with depiction of the Doctors of the Church by Francesco Boniforti. The apse was frescoed with the Life of St Paul by Pier Simone Fanelli.

The right crossing altar has a canvas depicting the Holy Trinity and Santi Barnabiti (1742) by Sebastiano Conca. During the First World War, the church was used as a granary, and also used to store materials during the Second World War. It underwent restoration during the 1960s. Until 2016, it had been used for exhibitions and cultural events. The church suffered damage during the 2016 earthquake.
