= San Pietro in Valle, Fano =

Church in Fano, Italy

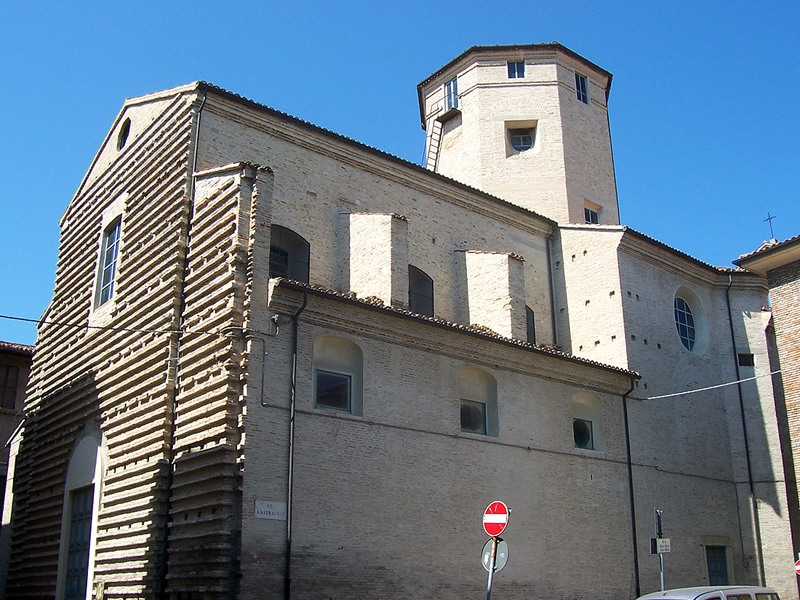
589FanoSPietro.JPG

San Pietro in Valle is a baroque-style church located on Via Nolfi/Via San Francesco in the town of Fano, province of Pesaro and Urbino in the Marche region of Italy.

== History ==
A more ancient church dedicated to St Peter had been located at this spot, in the incline (ad vallum) between the old Roman town and the coast. The location gave the church an original name that changed into in valle. The present church was erected by the Oratorians, who called on Giovanni Battista Cavagna from Naples to design the church just after 1608 until his death in 1613. The church was consecrated in 1617. The facade remain incomplete, although the interior is rich in decoration.

The dome was built (1696) atop an octagonal tiburium by Girolamo Caccia, and decorated on the interior by Lauro Buonaguardia in 1699-1700. The stucco-work (1619) was completed by Pietro Solari, while the frescoes were painted (1618-1620) by Antonio Viviani of Urbino, who painted Meeting of St Peter and Paul, Crucifixion of St Peter, Glory of St Peter, St Peter lies about Jesus, Fall of Simon Magus, Christ walks on Water, Quo Vadis, and Embarcation of St Paul in Malta. Some of the sculptural main altar decoration (1710) is by Giorgio Ferretti.

Most of the original altarpieces of the church have mainly been moved to the Pinacoteca Civica. Viviani also painted an Annunciation in the presbytery and two canvases in the chapel of St Paul (Fall and Decapitation of St Paul). The third chape on the left has a canvas depicting St Paul resuscitates Eutichius by Lorenzo Garbieri. The first chapel on the left, has an Annunciation (1621) by Guido Reni. The first chapel on the right has an altarpiece depicting the Virgin appears to St Phillip Neri (1699) by Luigi Garzi. The third chapel on the right has two canvases depicting a Crucifixion and Deposition by Alessandro Vitali, placed adjacent to a wooden Crucifix by Pietro Liberi. The Second chapel on the right has a Birth and Decapitation of St John the Baptist by Gian Giacomo Pandolfi. At one time, this chapel also held a St John the Baptist by Guercino, looted by Napoleonic forces. It now has a Birth of the Baptist by Sebastiano Ceccarini. The same painter also painted a Sermon of St John the Baptist (1782) now in the sacristy as a companion piece. The first chapel on the left has a Flight from Egypt from Francesco Gabuzio; and a Dream of St Joseph (1631) by Giovanni Francesco Guerrieri. Gabuzio also painted for the second chapel on the left, the canvases depicting the Vision of St Carlo Borromeo, St Charles received by the Petrucci dressed as beggars, and St Charles heals the blind child.

The original main altarpiece by Guido Reni, depicting the Consignment to St Peter of the Keys (1626) was also looted by the French. It is now replaced by a copy by Carlo Magini. Other canvases that were also present were St Peter heals the Deaf by Simone Cantarini and St Peter resuscitates Tabitha by Matteo Loves. They are now in the Pinacoteca Civica di Fano or the Pinacoteca San Domenico. The church has a 16th-century bronze bust of St Peter.
