= Santa Maria degli Angeli a Pizzofalcone =

Church in Naples, Italy

Basilica of Santa Maria degli Angeli a Pizzofalcone Basilica di Santa Maria degli Angeli a Pizzofalcone (in Italian)
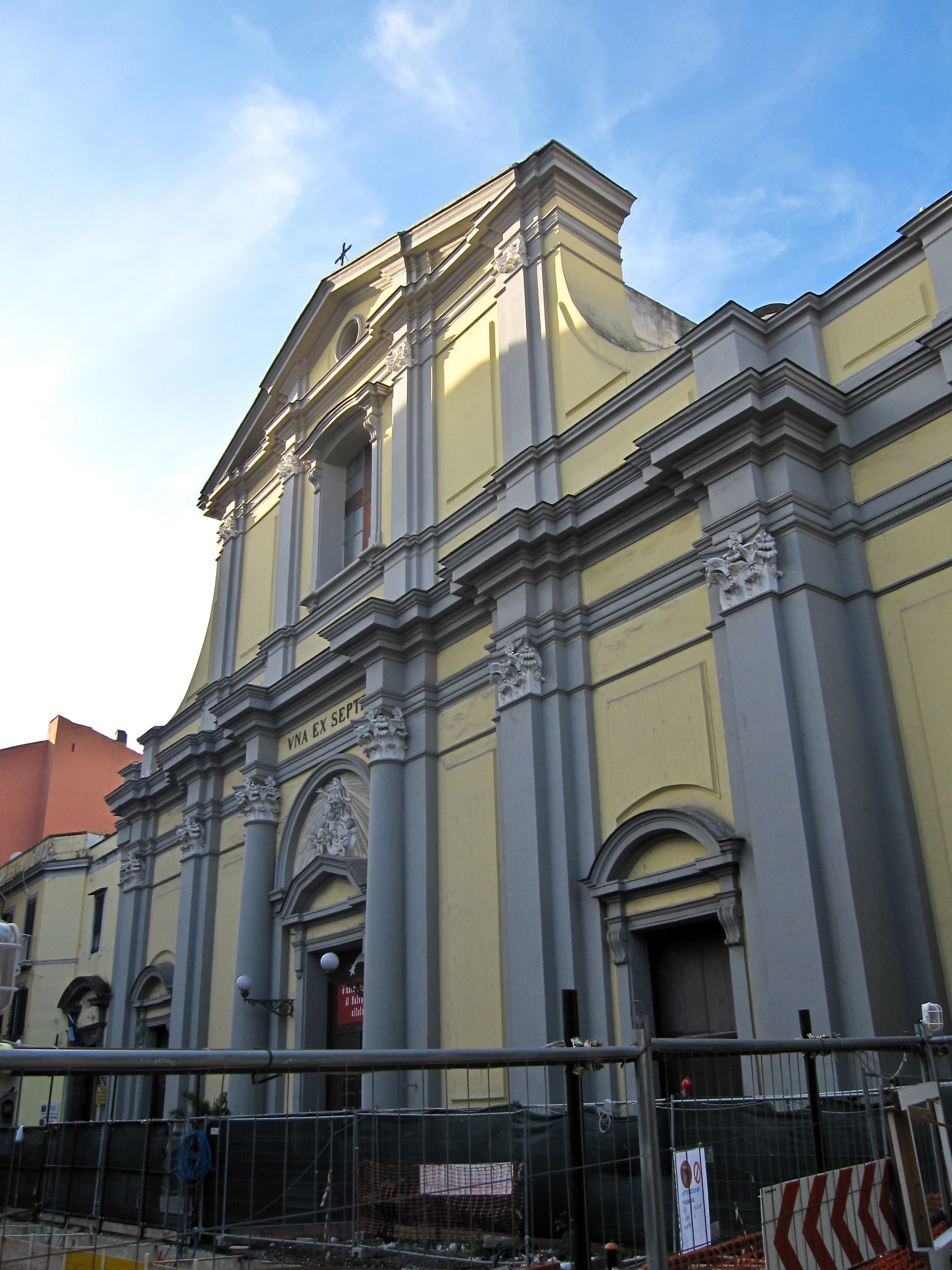
- Façade.

Religion
- Affiliation: Roman Catholic
- Diocese: Archdiocese of Naples
- Ecclesiastical or organizational status: Minor basilica

Location
- Location: Naples, Campania, Italy
- Interactive map of Basilica of Santa Maria degli Angeli a Pizzofalcone; Basilica di Santa Maria degli Angeli a Pizzofalcone (in Italian)
- Coordinates: 40.835326°N 14.244594°E

Architecture
- Type: Church
- Style: Baroque

Santa Maria degli Angeli a Pizzofalcone is a Baroque-style church in Naples, Italy.

A church, designed by Francesco Grimaldi, was built at the site for the Theatine Order. Construction started in 1587 and was completed in 1610.

The interior is decorated with paintings by Giordano, and Andrea Vaccaro. The central nave and transept ceilings were frescoed Scenes from the Life of the Virgin (1668-1675) by Giovanni Battista Beinaschi. The Cupola was frescoed with a Coronation of the Virgin. Some of these frescoes suffered damage from aerial bombing during the second World War. Francesco Maria Caselli painted the large canvases in the apse and transept. In the Chapel of the Immaculate Conception is a canvas depicting the Virgin by Massimo Stanzione, while Giovanni Bernardo Azzolino decorated the first and third chapels on the left side. In the choir is a canvas of San Gaetano (1662) by Luca Giordano. The main altar by Giovanni Battista Broggia was made in Neoclassic style. It has a canvas by Paolo De Matteis depicting Sant'Andrea in Extasis.

== Sources ==
- Ferrari, Giovanni Battista de; Vasi, Mariano (1826). Nuova guida di Napoli, dei contorni di Procida, Ischia e Capri, Compilata su la Guida del Vasi, Prima Edizione. Naples: Tipografia de Porcelli. pp. 87–88.
- Portions derived from Italian Wikipedia entry.
