= Santa Maria della Stella, Naples =

Church building in Naples, Italy

Church of Santa Maria della Stella
- Chiesa di Santa Maria della Stella
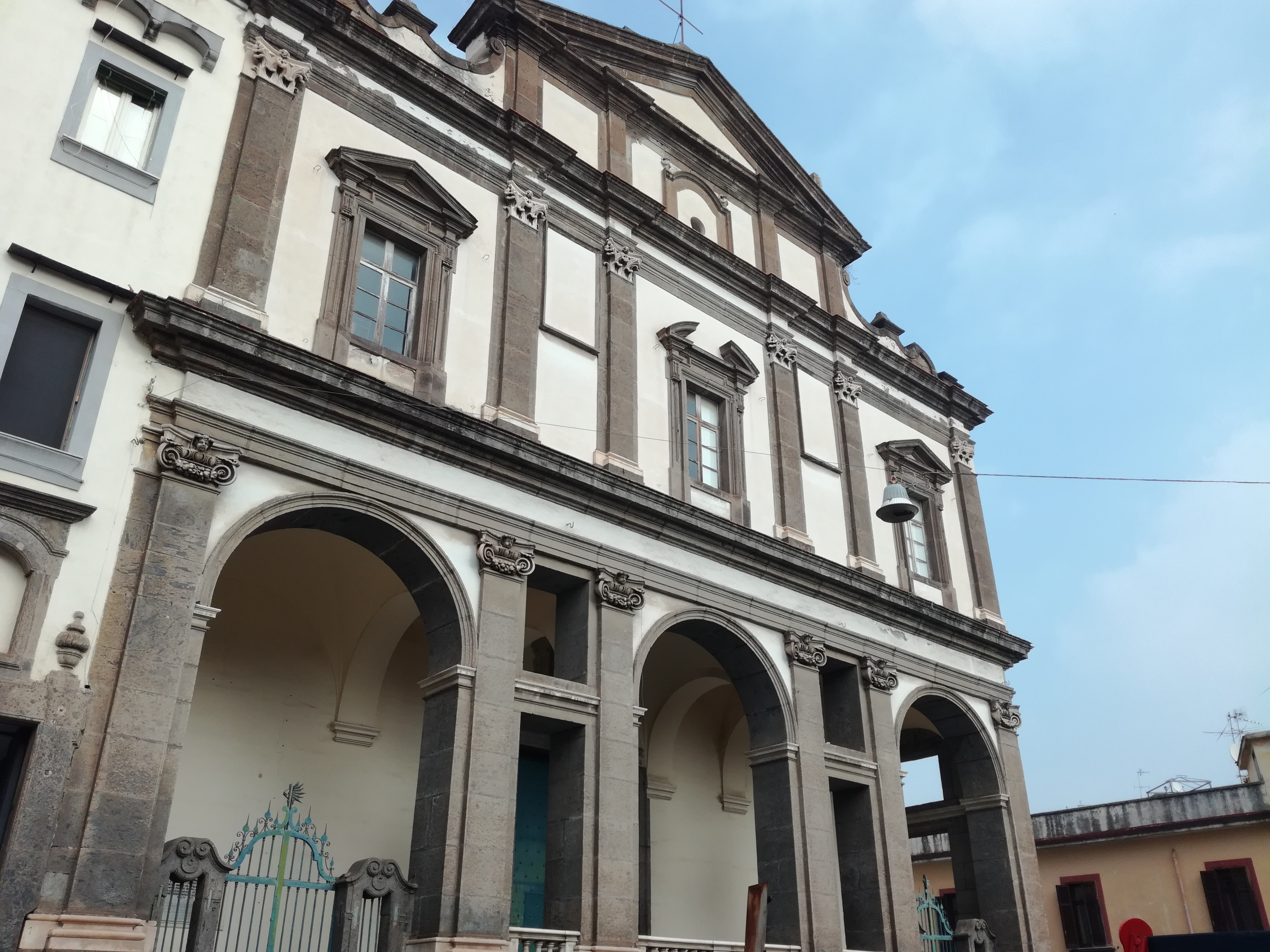
- The façade of Santa Maria della Stella in Naples.
- Church of Santa Maria della Stella
- 40.855855°N 14.251660°E
- Location: Naples; Province of Naples, Campania
- Country: Italy
- Denomination: Roman Catholic

History
- Status: Active

Administration
- Diocese: Roman Catholic Archdiocese of Naples

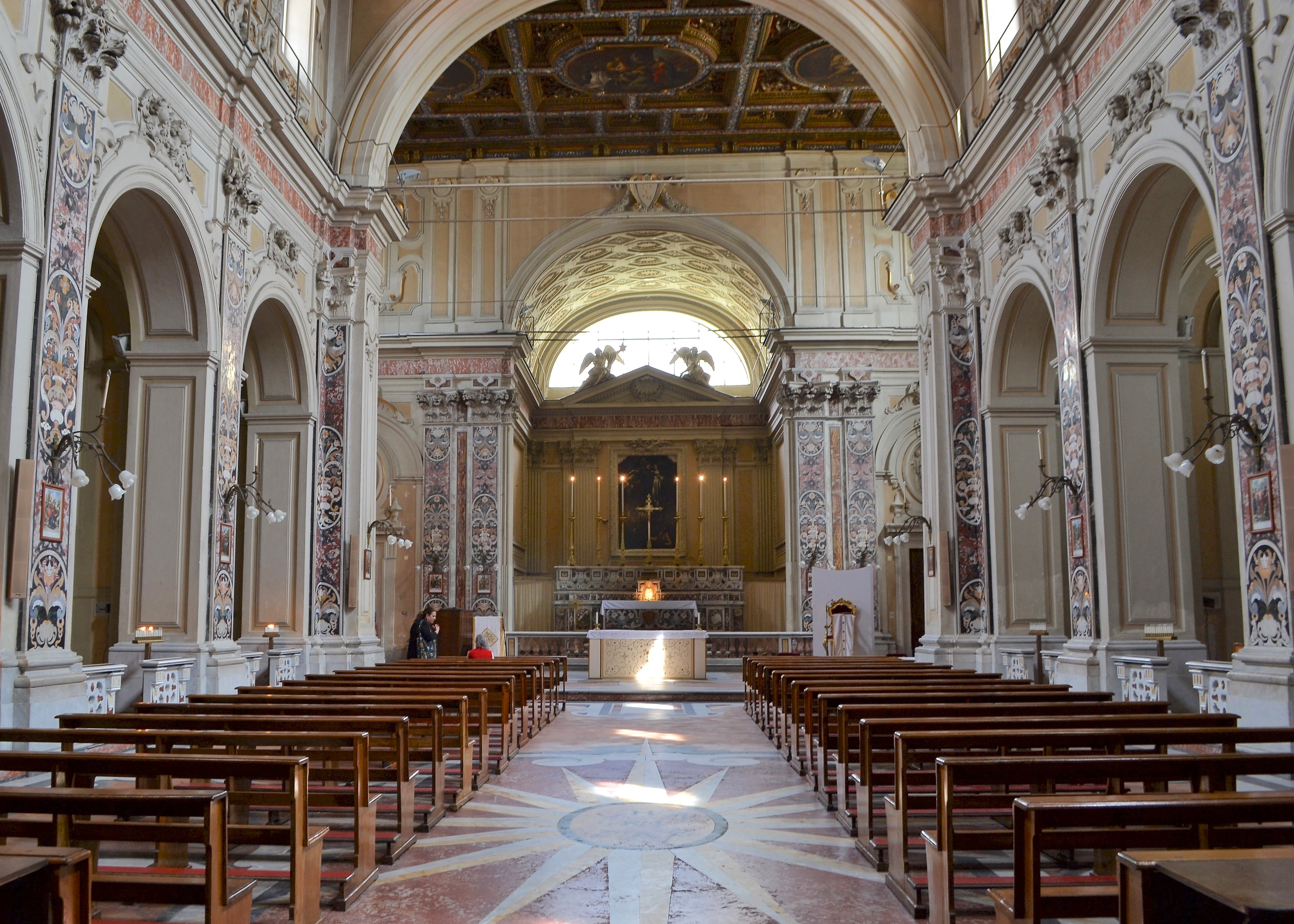
Interior.

Santa Maria della Stella is a church located on Via Stella 25 in the quartiere of its name in Naples, Italy.

== History ==
The church was built in 1571, to host an icon of the Virgin, previously held in an aedicule near Porta San Gennaro. The Minims rebuilt and enlarged the church in 1587 using designs commissioned by Domenico Fontana. In 1637, a pupil of Fontana, Bartolomeo Picchiatti, designed the facade, which was finally completed in 1734 by Domenico Antonio Vaccaro. Further reconstructions occurred in the 18th century.

In an aedicule on the facade there was once a fresco of Madonna della Stella with Saints Gennaro and Francesco di Paola. The interior, after the fire in 1944, was redecorated with works of art from other churches. The main altar for example is derived from the church of San Sebastiano and canvases by Pietro del Po are from the Palatine Chapel of the Castel Nuovo (Birth of the Virgin, Presentation in the Temple and Flight to Egypt). At the end of the presbytery is an altarpiece by Battistello Caracciolo, depicting Immaculate Conception and Saints Domenic and Francis (1607), the only painting to survive the 1944 fire, since it was originally held in the sacristy. The sacristy is in rococo style, executed by Luca Vecchione (1740–1745). There is a bust of Luigi Riccio (died 1643), bishop of Vico Equense.

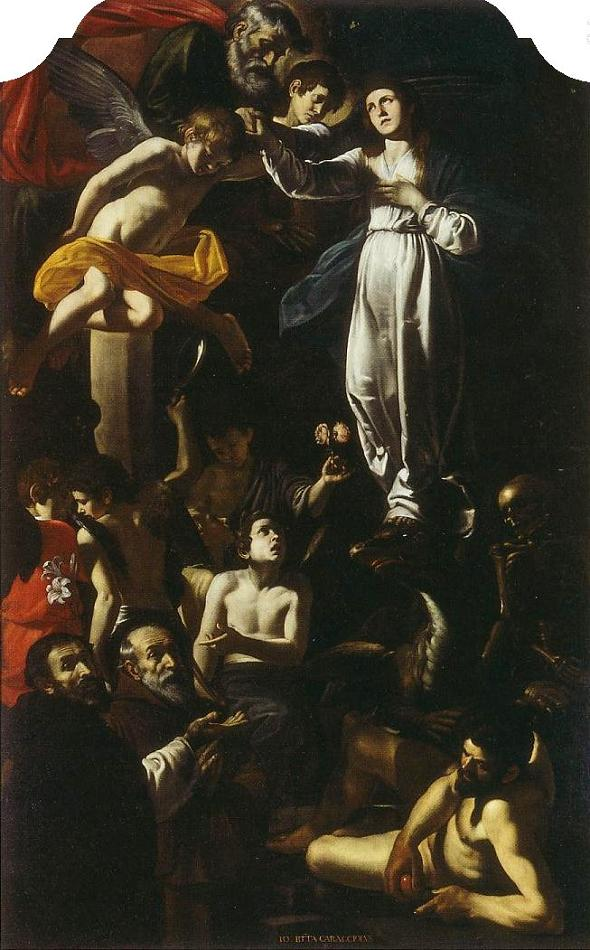
Battistello Caracciolo, Immaculate Conception with Saints Dominic and Francis of Paola (1607)

The monks were expelled from the convent in 1861, today it is occupied by the Caserma Podgora; the cloister has frescoes by a pupil of Belisario Corenzio.

== Bibliography ==
- Vincenzo Regina, Le chiese di Napoli. Viaggio indimenticabile attraverso la storia artistica, architettonica, letteraria, civile e spirituale della Napoli sacra, Newton e Compton editor, Naples 2004.
