= Giovanni Magenta =

Italian architect and scholar

- Contemporary portrait of Giovanni Magenta
- Born: Giovanni Ambrogio Mazenta; 1565; Milan, Duchy of Milan
- Died: 23 December 1635 (aged 69–70); Rome, Papal States
- Known for: Architecture
- Notable work: Santissimo Salvatore, Bologna; San Paolo Maggiore, Bologna
- Movement: Late-Renaissance and Baroque

Giovanni Magenta or Giovanni Ambrogio Mazenta (Italian pronunciation: [dʒoˈvanni maˈdʒenta]; 1565 – 23 December 1635) was an Italian Catholic priest and architect. He designed Bologna Cathedral (1605), later modified by Alfonso Torreggiani (1765), and the church of Santissimo Salvatore (1605–1623) and San Paolo Maggiore (1606–1636) in Bologna.

== Life and works ==
Giovanni Magenta came from a distinguished Milanese family, and was educated as a humanist scholar; he entered the Barnabite Order in 1591, becoming General in 1612, a post he held for five years. The Order’s extensive building programme took Magenta to various parts of Italy, but his most important works were in Bologna in the first quarter of the 17th century; his role in later projects, however, seems to have been only advisory. Magenta designed three churches in Bologna: Santissimo Salvatore, San Pietro and San Paolo.

Santissimo Salvatore was completed to Magenta’s design of 1605 by Tommaso Martelli in 1623. The plan appears to be based on that of the Church of the Gesù (1568), Rome, by Jacopo Vignola, although Magenta cited the Baths of Diocletian, restored by Michelangelo in 1561 as Santa Maria degli Angeli e dei Martiri, as the source of the free-standing interior columns. The nave bays, with their side chapels, are of unequal length; the longer, central bay is groin-vaulted. This, together with the tall arches to the side chapels, creates a transeptal effect in the nave, so that the impression conveyed is of a compact Greek-cross unit, with the crossing and sanctuary, both without columns, as an addition; early drawings show this clearly. The interior remains monochromatic as originally designed, spared the addition of decoration common to early Baroque churches. The façade was also based on the Church of the Gesù, but the unadorned brick wall surface, with the entrance portal unconstrained within the architectonic frame, shows north Italian tendencies. Santissimo Salvatore was influential for later Baroque churches.

Façade of San Carlo alle Mortelle, Naples, Magenta's last work

Magenta’s other two Bolognese churches were less robustly articulated. In his design of 1605 for the rebuilding of the cathedral of San Pietro, Magenta retained the choir (1575) by Domenico Tibaldi, and he added a separate nave with alternating high and low nave-arcade arches. He later added bays to each end to integrate it with the choir. Work was started in 1608 by Floriano Ambrosini and was continued by Nicolò Donati, who altered Magenta’s design, from 1612. The church of San Paolo (1606; altered 1634) conformed more faithfully to the Gesù type but with distinctive lateral illumination in the vault.

From 1612 to 1620 Magenta lived in Milan; he made designs for the churches of San Carlo ai Catinari, Rome, with a Greek-cross nave supported by free-standing columns, later executed (c. 1612) by Rosato Rosati with piers; and for San Giovanni delle Vigne (1618; altered 1736), in Lodi, Lombardy, also with a row of free-standing columns. While serving the Order in Rome between 1620 and 1626, he designed San Paolo, Macerata (executed 1623–1655 by Antonio Ursuzio), which was a modest version of Santissimo Salvatore. From 1626 Magenta travelled extensively as a Visitor; he made designs for the churches of San Giovanni (c. 1627) in Acqui Terme, Piedmont; San Carlo (c. 1635), Arpino, Latium, with an octagonal plan similar to Borromini’s San Carlo alle Quattro Fontane (1638–41), Rome; and, his last work, San Carlo alle Mortelle (1635) in Naples.

== Leonardo's journals ==
Leonardo da Vinci's notebooks were entrusted to his pupil and heir Francesco Melzi after Leonardo's death for publication. After Melzi's death in 1570, the collection passed to his son, the lawyer Orazio, who initially took little interest in the journals. In 1587, a Melzi household tutor named Lelio Gavardi took 13 of the manuscripts to Florence, intending to offer them to the grand duke of Tuscany. However, following Francesco I de' Medici's untimely death, Gavardi took them to Pisa to give to his relative Aldus Manutius the Younger; there, Magenta reproached Gavardi for having taken the manuscripts illicitly. Gavardi acknowledged his fault and asked Magenta, who had finished his studies and was going home to Milan, to return them to Orazio. Having many more such works in his possession, Orazio gifted the 13 volumes to Magenta. When news spread of these lost works of Leonardo's, Orazio retrieved seven of the 13 manuscripts from Magenta's brother, and gave them to Pompeo Leoni for publication in two volumes; one of these was the Codex Atlanticus.

During his six-year stay in Rome (1620–1626), Magenta informed the scholar Cassiano dal Pozzo of the existence of Leonardo da Vinci's autographs. Armed with this information, dal Pozzo collaborated with the Milanese collector Galeazzo Arconati, who owned several original manuscripts, to obtain copies of Leonardo’s writings on painting. This scholarly exchange ultimately resulted in the first printed edition of Leonardo's Trattato della Pittura (A Treatise on Painting), published in Paris in 1651.

At dal Pozzo's request, Magenta wrote a biography of Leonardo and a detailed history of the provenance of his autograph manuscripts. Dal Pozzo added Magenta's text, entitled Alcune memorie de’ fatti di Leonardo da Vinci a Milano e de’ suoi libri (Memories Concerning the Deeds of Leonardo da Vinci in Milan and his Books), to the manuscript of the Trattato he supervised for publication, now preserved in the Biblioteca Ambrosiana in Milan. Long lost, Magenta's Memorie were rediscovered by the prefect of the Ambrosiana Luigi Gramatica and published posthumously in 1919. They were first published in English translation in Robert Payne's biography Leonardo (1978).

== Writings ==
- Luigi D. Gramatica, ed. (1919). Le memorie su Leonardo da Vinci di Don Ambrogio Mazenta (PDF). Milan: Alfieri & Lacroix.

== Bibliography ==
- Wittkower, Rudolf (1993). "Art and Architecture Italy, 1600-1750". Pelican History of Art. 1980. Penguin Books Ltd. p. 122.
- "Mazenta [Magenta], Giovanni Ambrogio". Grove Art Online. Oxford: Oxford University Press. 2003. doi:10.1093/gao/9781884446054.article.T056253.
- Milano, Valentina (2009). "MAZENTA, Giovanni Ambrogio". Dizionario Biografico degli Italiani (in Italian). Vol. 72: Massimo–Mechetti. Rome: Institute of the Italian Encyclopaedia. ISBN 978-88-12-00032-6.
- Sparti, Donatella Livia (2003). "Cassiano Dal Pozzo, Poussin and the Making and Publication of Leonardo's Trattato". Journal of the Warburg and Courtauld Institutes. 66: 143–188. JSTOR 40026315.
