= San Carlo alle Mortelle =

Church in Naples, Italy

Coordinates: 40.838650°N 14.241270°E

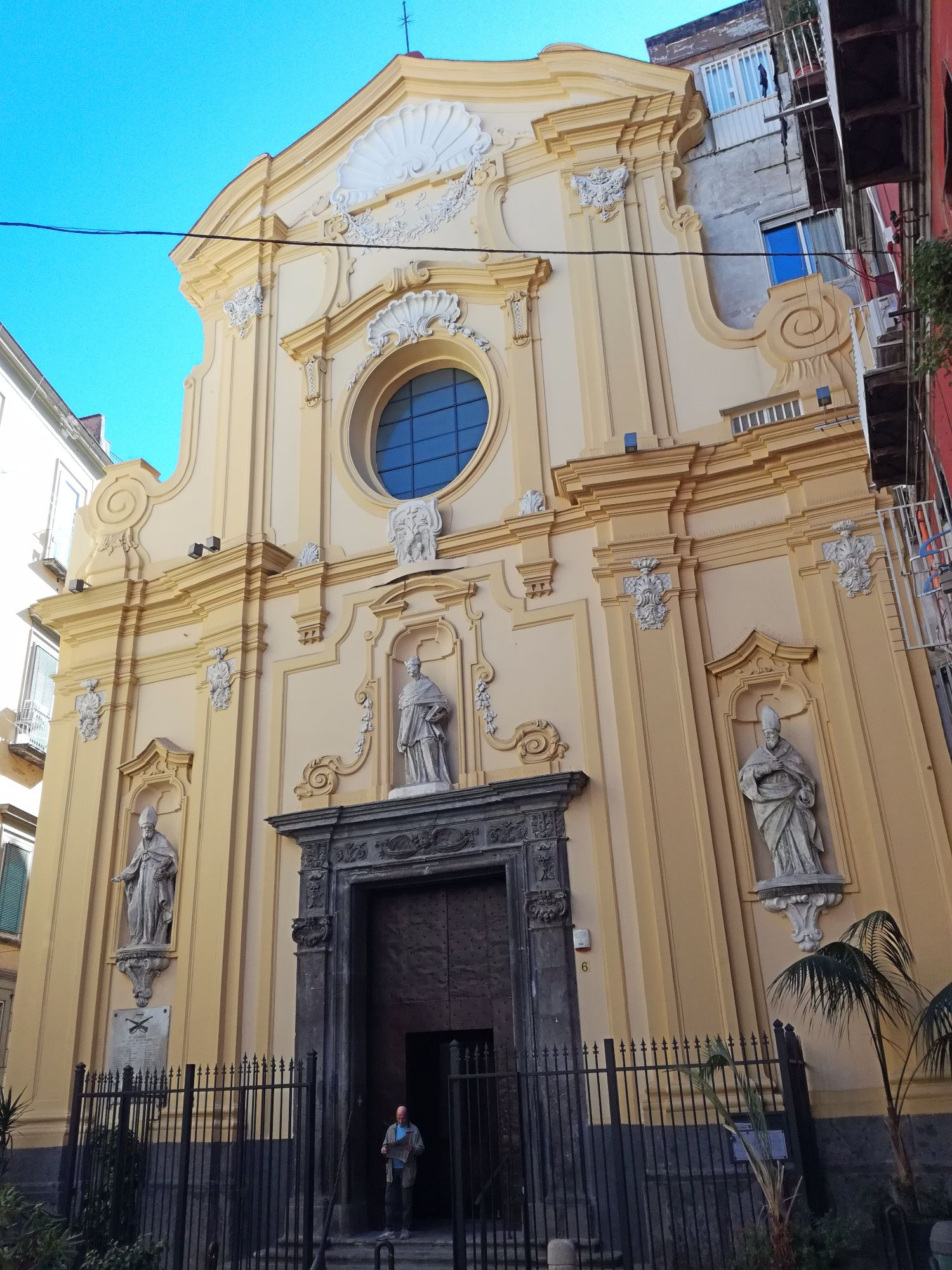
Exterior view.

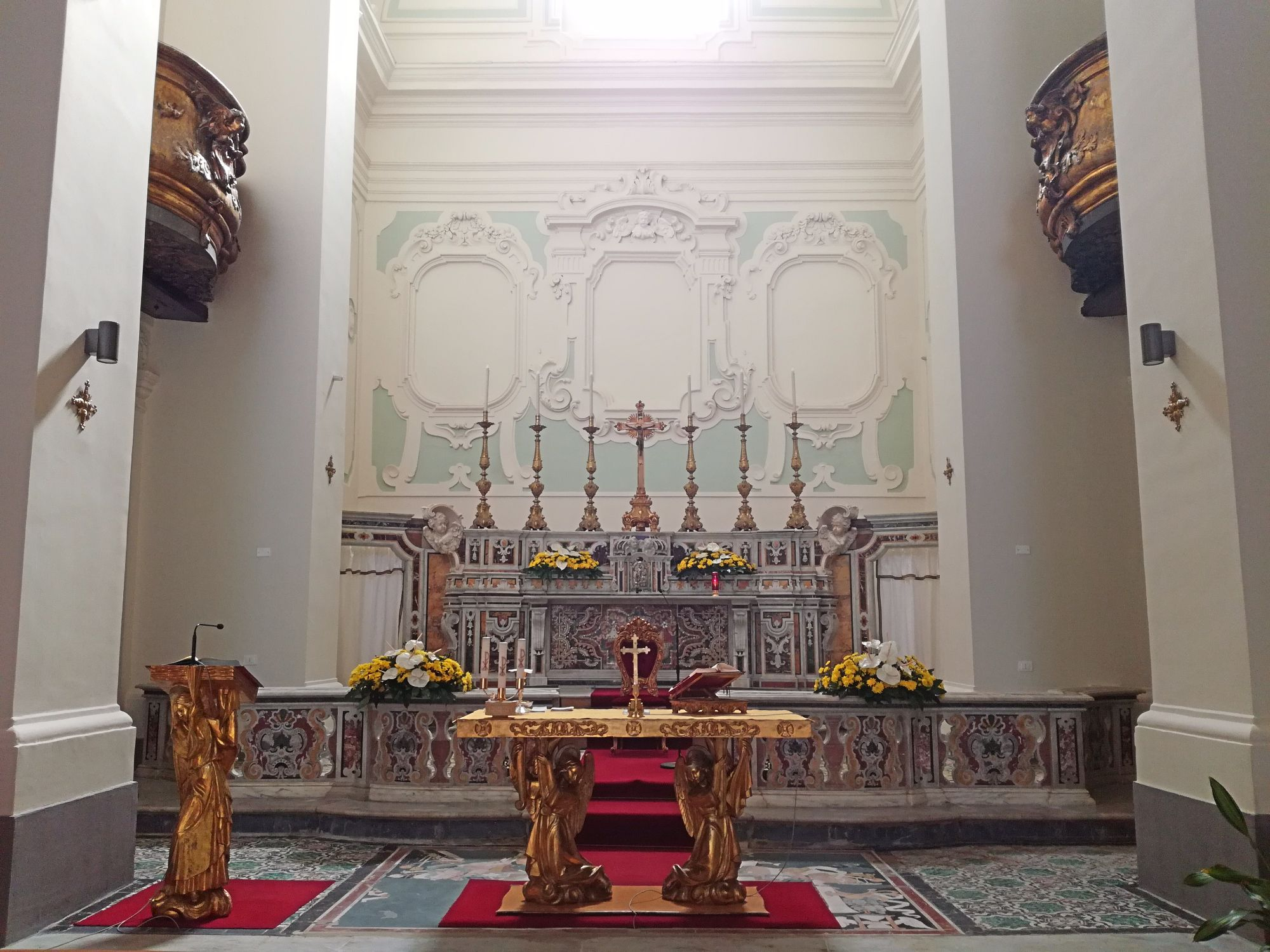
Main altar.

San Carlo alle Mortelle is a Baroque style, Roman Catholic church in central Naples, Italy.

== History ==
The church was erected in 1616 under design of Giovanni Magenta. Most of the work was completed within the 17th century, while the façade, designed by Enrico Pini, was finished only in the mid- and late-18th century. The latter has two orders, with capitals featuring floral motifs; at the sides of the main portal are statues of St Liborius and the Blessed Alessandro Sauli (from the Barnabite Order), while in a central niche is the statue of St Charles Borromeo, the church's titular.

The interior is on the Latin cross plan, with three side chapels. In a building at the right of the church are the remains of the Baroque cloister and, in another building now housing a school, remains of Francesco Solimena's frescoes, once part of the college annexed to the church.

== Sources ==
- Regina, Vincenzo (2004). Le chiese di Napoli. Viaggio indimenticabile attraverso la storia artistica, architettonica, letteraria, civile e spirituale della Napoli sacra. Naples: Newton e Compton.
