= Giuliano Finelli =

Italian sculptor

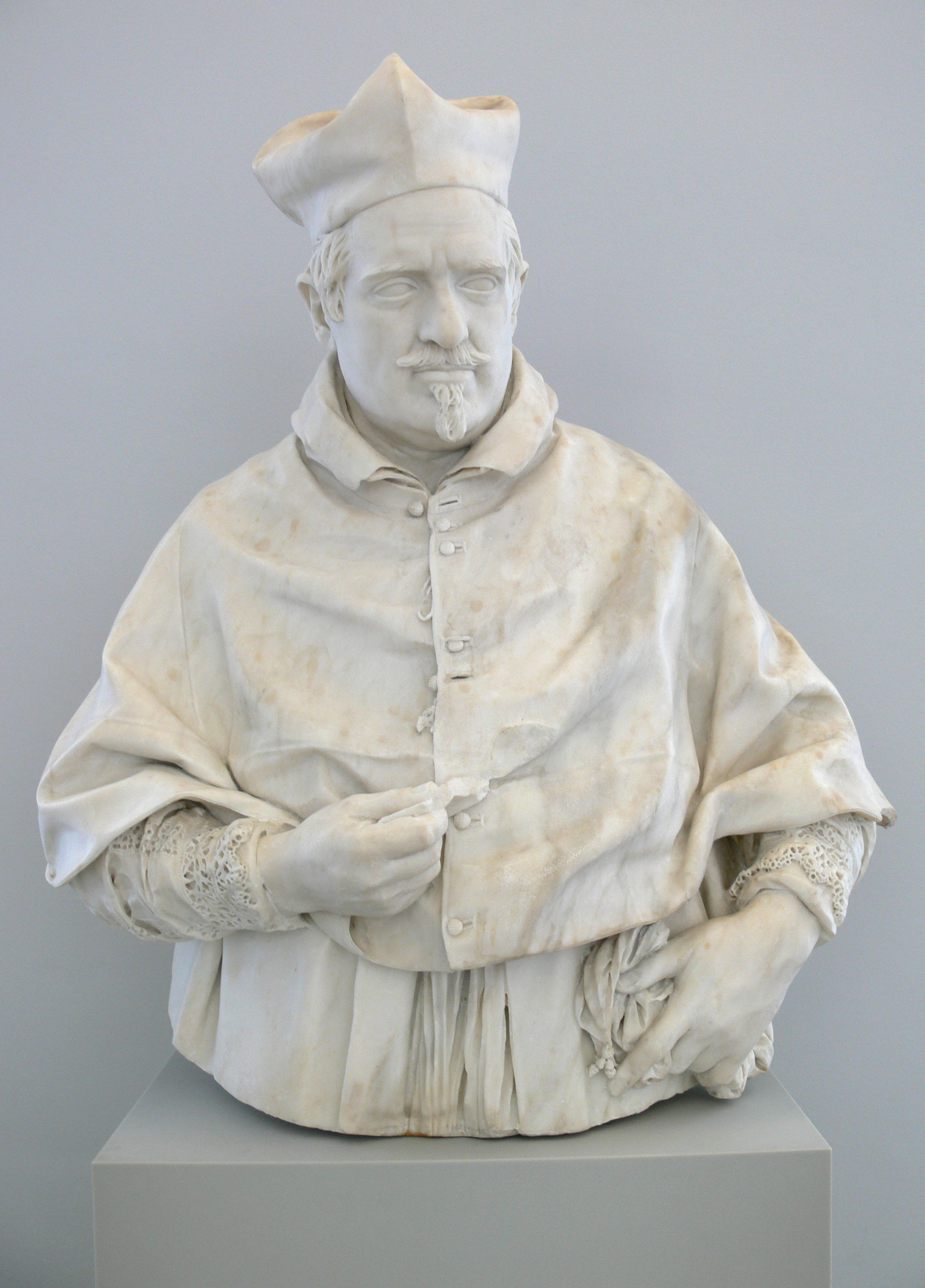
Bust of Cardinal Montalto

Giuliano Finelli (1601–1653) was an Italian Baroque sculptor who emerged from the workshop of Gian Lorenzo Bernini.

He was born in Carrara to a family of marble masons in a town associated with mining of the stone, and he initially trained with Michelangelo Naccherino. He was active in Bernini's studio for a few years, but he broke with Bernini in 1629, when he felt slighted by the awarding of the choice commission of a Saint Helena statue for the crossing of St Peter's to Andrea Bolgi. He is also purported to have also been slighted by failure to be recognized as the detail master behind the Apollo and Daphne statue of Bernini. For some time, he found occasional work, often with the support of Pietro da Cortona.

The difference between the two sculptors, Bernini and Finelli, was slight. Finelli is highly meticulous about carving tiny details, a focus which often seems to drain from the greater emotion of the piece. The prolific Bernini was less conscious of lacy frillery in dress, and more centered on the psychology. The contrast can be seen in their portraits of a common patron, Cardinal Scipione Borghese. Bernini's portrait is animated, while Finelli's is more sober and has a slight downgaze. Finelli also completed the image of Cardinal Giulio Antonio Santorio (c.1630) at San Giovanni in Laterano.

Within a few years of leaving the employ of Bernini, Finelli left for Naples with his pupil and nephew, Domenico Guidi. He is known best for a number of portraits and statues in the Chapel of San Gennaro and in the Cathedral of Naples. In Naples, he had to compete with the sculptor Cosimo Fanzago for commissions.

Finelli died in Rome in 1653 of reasons unknown.

== Sources ==
- Connors, Joseph. Review of Jennifer Montagu's Roman Baroque Sculpture: The Industry of Art, New Haven and London, 1989, in The New York Review of Books
- Finelli gallery at Web Gallery of Art
