= Regi Lagni =

Coordinates: 40°59′N 13°58′E

The Regi Lagni are a set of rectilinear and mostly man-made channels covering 1.095 km^{2} in 99 towns in the Province of Caserta, Province of Avellino, Province of Benevento and the Metropolitan City of Naples. They were built as part of canalisation, land reclamation and flood prevention work on the Clanio between 1610 and 1616 by viceroy Pedro Fernández de Castro during Spanish rule of southern Italy. The work was led by the architect Domenico Fontana.
