= Santuario della Madonna dell'Arco =

Catholic shrine in Naples, Italy

Coordinates: 40°52′11.0″N 14°23′19.1″E

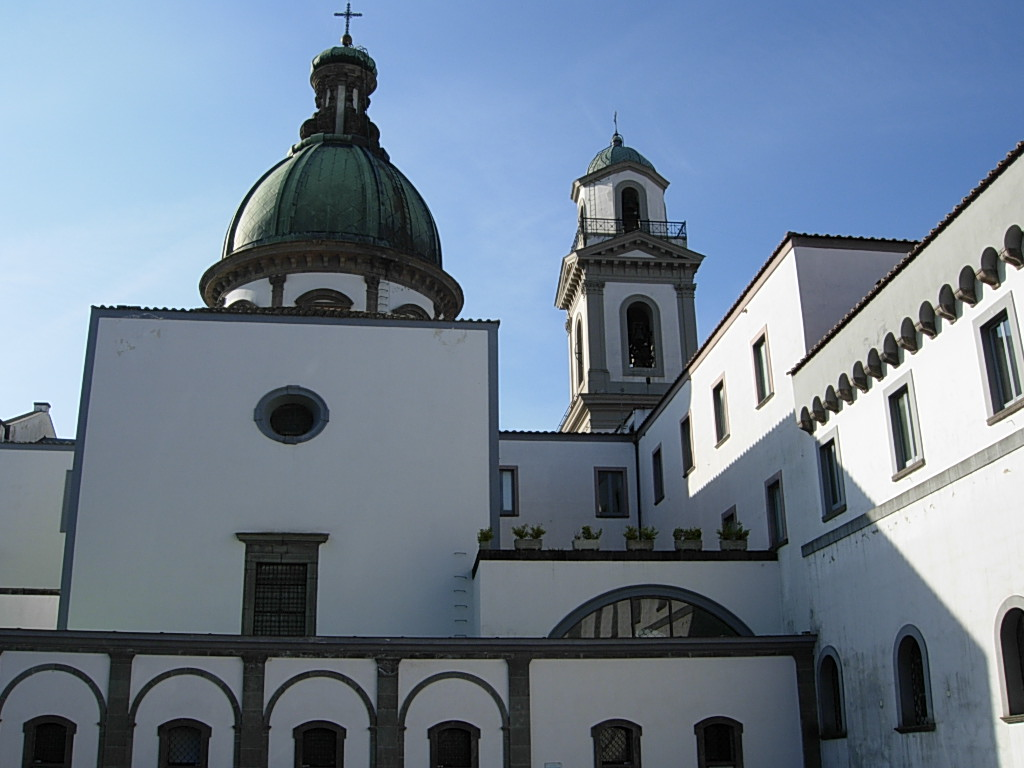
The shrine

The Santuario della Madonna dell'Arco is a Roman Catholic shrine in Sant'Anastasia, a town at the feet of Mount Somma (Mount Vesuvius' most ancient crater). It is a pilgrimage destination for the so-called 'fujenti' or 'battenti' pilgrims from all over the Campania region every Easter Monday. As they walk, they usually sing a traditional folk song first written in the 15th century and later put to music. A fire is also lit on the bell tower every second Sunday in September for the feast of the Coronation of the Virgin.

== History ==
The site was originally occupied by a votive aedicula, built in the 15th century and housing a Madonna and Child picture named "Madonna dell'Arco" after a nearby arch from an ancient Roman aqueduct. Tradition holds that on Easter Monday 1450 a young man was angry at losing a game of jeu de mail and threw a ball at the image, whose cheek began to bleed. This was taken as a miracle by the local people and news of it reached Raimondo Orsini, count of Sarno and grand justiciar of the Kingdom of Naples, who put the young man on trial. He was condemned to death and hanged next to the votive aedicula.

On Easter Monday 1589, during the feast of the Madonna dell'Arco, a woman from the town named Aurelia Del Prete went to the shrine with her husband Marco Cennamo to offer an ex voto depicting the Madonna after recovering the man from a serious eye disease. The woman had a piglet with her, but it got loose and she could not get it back from among the crowd, so Aurelia angrily cursed her husband's ex voto depicting the Madonna. The following year she fell gravely ill and soon died on 28 July 1590. The illness made her feet fall off, and they are still kept locked in a small iron cage in the shrine.

The cult began to spread beyond Naples and in 1592 pope Clement VIII sent father Giovanni Leonardi from Rome to Naples to cooperate with the bishop of Nola in administering the shrine's almsgiving and lands. The first stone of the current sanctuary was laid in 1593 and two years later it was handed over to the Dominicans, who began enlarging it. However, due to tensions with the Reale Albergo dei Poveri (who still held onto part of the monastery) and various collapses, it only reached its final form in 1973. On 25 March 1676 viceroy Antonio Alvarez and cardinal Pier Francesco Orsini (future Pope Benedict XIII) saw the sanctuary's image of Mary surrounded by stars.

== Architecture ==
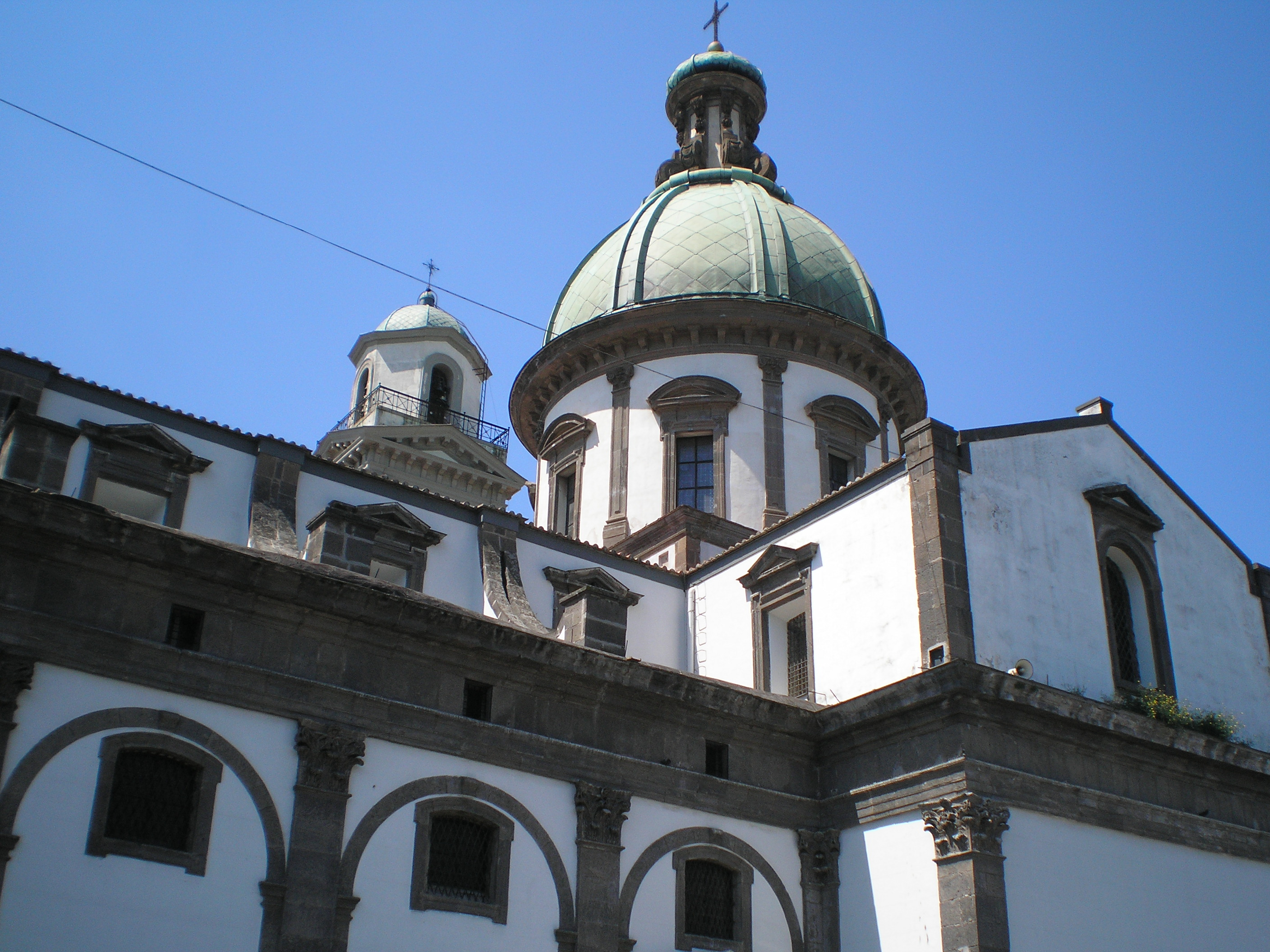
The facade

The complex includes a convent, the bell tower, and the main church. The inside of the shrine has a Latin cross plan with a single barrel-vaulted nave having four chapels on each side. In the middle of the transept there is the votive aedicula housing the Madonna and Child picture. The columns are covered by votive tablets called 'ex voto' dedicated to the Madonna. They are an authentic expression of four centuries of popular art. From the 15th century on, they depict both episodes of the everyday life and the state of poverty of the people from the Campania region.
