= Francesco Grimaldi (architect) =

Francesco Grimaldi (Oppido Lucano, 1543 – Naples, 1 August 1613) was an Italian Theatine Order priest and architect, working mainly in Naples.

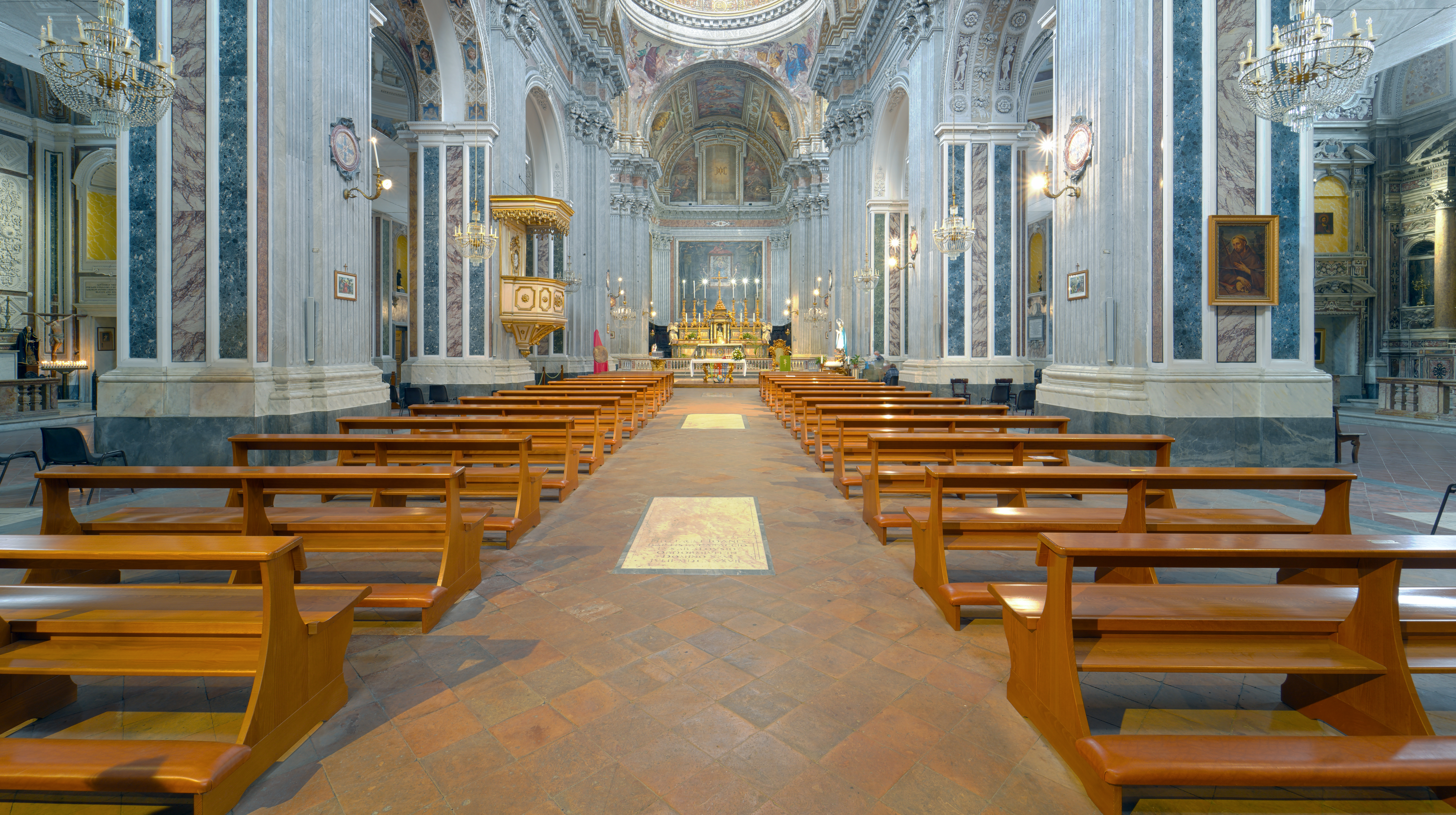
Basilica of Santa Maria degli Angeli a Pizzofalcone, Naples

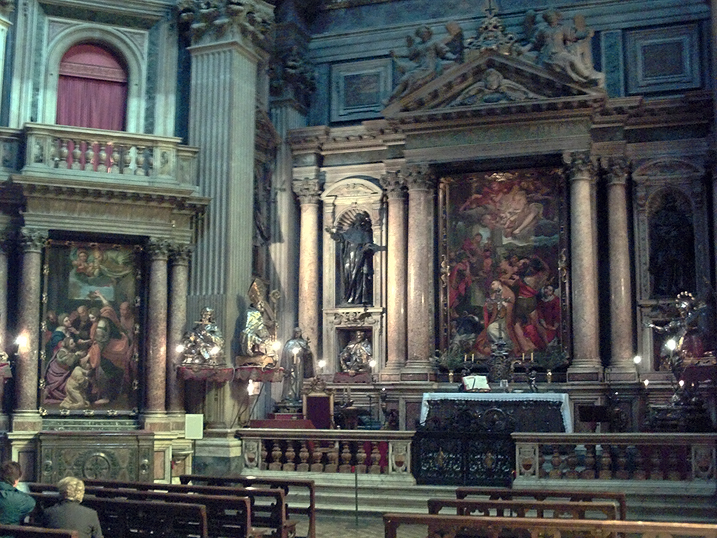
Interior of Cappella del Tesoro di San Gennaro

Among his designs are works for:

- Convent of the Theatine Order (1590) at the church of Santi Apostoli.
- Church of Santi Apostoli, which resembles Sant'Andrea della Valle in Rome.
- Cappella del Tesoro (1608) in the Cathedral of Naples
- Church of Santa Maria degli Angioli a Pizzo-Falcone.
- Church of the Trinità delle Monache.
- Church of the San Paolo.
- Sant'Andrea delle Dame, Naples

== Sources ==
- Sasso, Camillo Napoleone (1856). Storia de'monumenti di Napoli e degli architetti che gli edificavono: Dallo Stabilimento della Monarchia, sino al nostri Giorni. Vol. 1. Largo Regina Coeli, Naples: Tipografia Federico Vitale. pp. 224–226. ISBN 9780371925898.
