= Giovanni Giacomo Di Conforto =

Italian architect and engineer

Giovanni Giacomo Di Conforto or Giovanni Giacomo Conforto (1569 – June 1630, in Naples) was an Italian architect and engineer, active mainly in Naples, Italy, in a late Mannerist style.

He participated in the construction of many churches in Naples. His projects include the basement of the Chiesa dell'Ascensione a Chiaia, after completed by Cosimo Fanzago and Santa Teresa degli Scalzi(or agli Studi) (1602–1612) whose facade was completed by the same architect too, Santa Maria della Verità (San Agostino agli Scalzi), as well as rebuilding of the Certosa di San Martino and San Severo al Pendino.
