= Crypt of Saint Erasmus =

Crypt in Gaeta, Italy

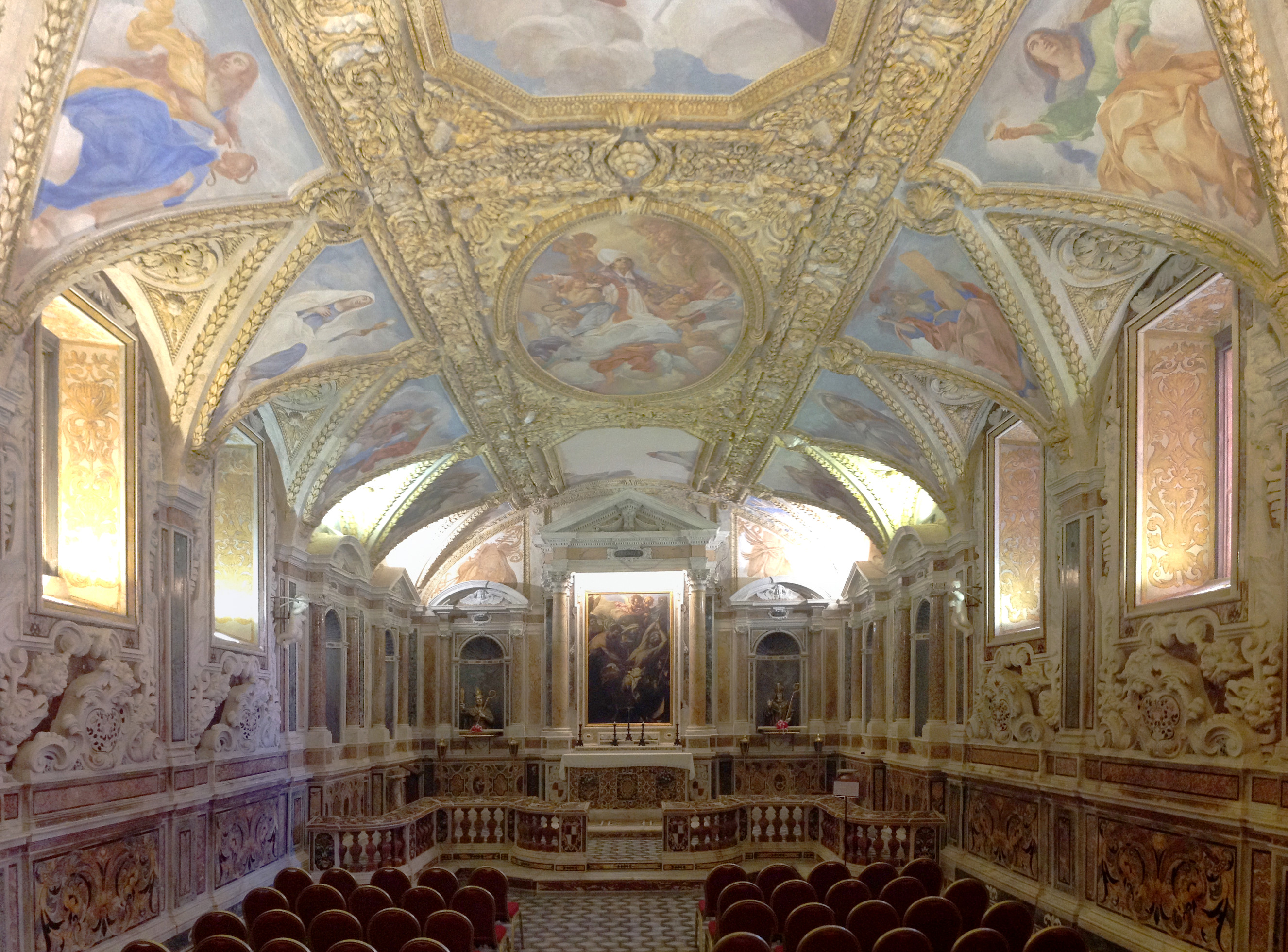
The crypt of St. Erasmus.

The crypt of Saint Erasmus is a chapel located inside the cathedral of Saints Erasmus and Marcianus and Santa Maria Assunta in Gaeta, corresponding to the crypt of the basilica. An important example of Neapolitan Baroque architecture, it represents within Gaeta Cathedral the only room unified in style and unchanged in its original layout. The crypt houses the relics of Saints Erasmus of Formia and Marcian of Syracuse, patrons of the city of Gaeta.

== History ==
=== The medieval crypt ===
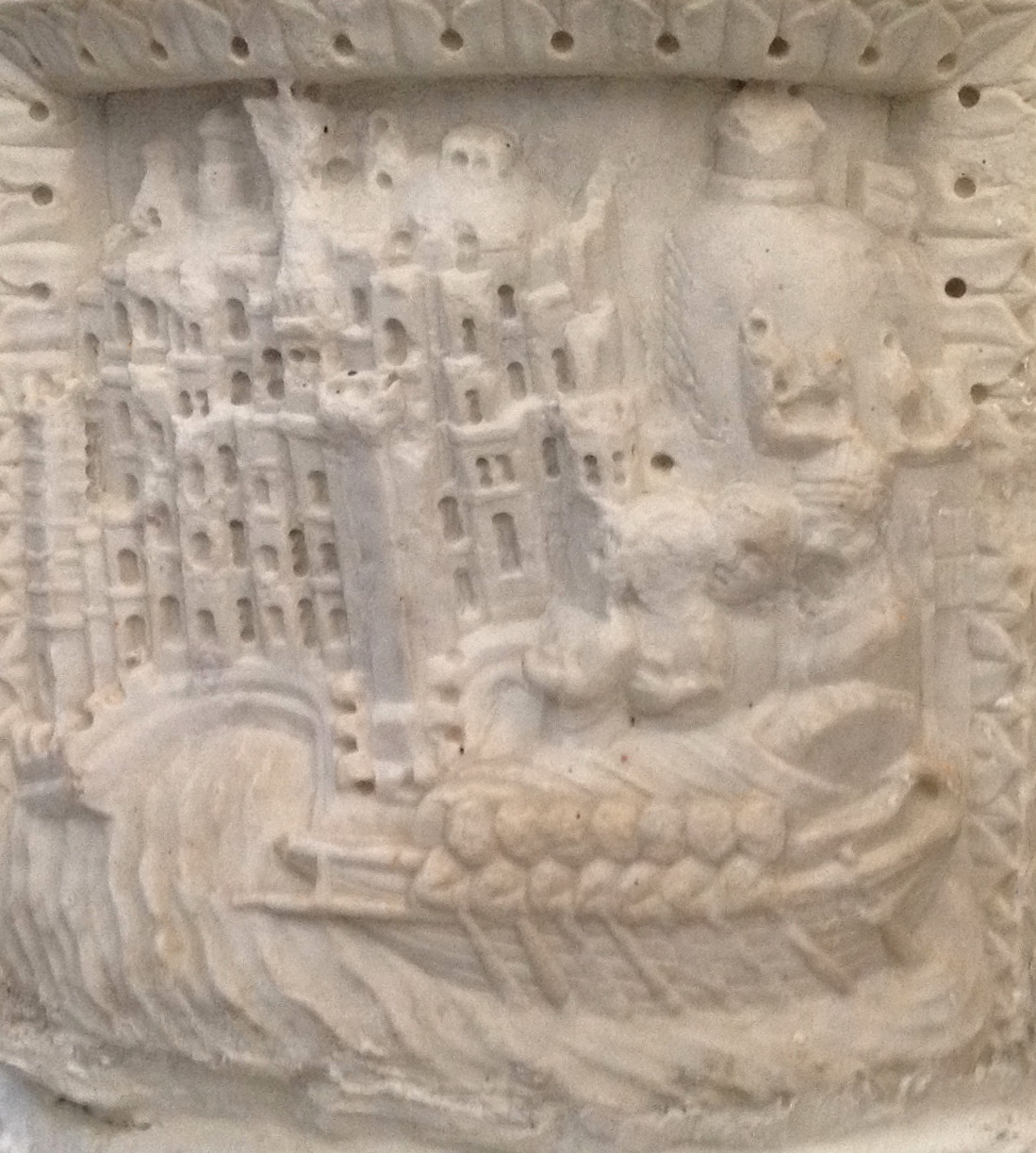
Entrance of the relics of St. Erasmus into the city of Gaeta, tile from the column of the Easter candle in Gaeta Cathedral (second half of the 14th century).

In 842, the bishop of Formia John III, due to Saracen raids, wanted to move the mortal remains of the martyrs Erasmus, Innocent and Probus from their original burial place (on which the cathedral of St. Erasmus had then been built) to the church of Santa Maria del Parco in the safer Gaeta (in about 870 the bishopric was also moved to Gaeta). They were walled up inside a pillar and remained there until they were found by Bishop Bono, attested from 919; to commemorate this event, the hypati John I and Docibilis II, his son, coined a medal (or seal) in lead that is considered the oldest medal coined in Gaeta. An underground chapel called "incorpo," located under the southern area of the church, was specially built to house the relics, inside whose altar along with the remains of Saints Erasmus, Innocent and Probus (placed inside a single sarcophagus) were also placed those of St. Marcian of Syracuse (who arrived in Gaeta probably in the 10th century). In 918 the mortal remains of the martyr Eupuria were found in Santa Maria del Parco, inside the altar dedicated to the saint, following a miraculous event.

Beginning in 978 the cathedral was enlarged and was consecrated on January 22, 1106 by Pope Paschal II and dedicated to St. Mary of the Assumption and St. Erasmus (a double dedication attested since 995) and probably also to St. Marcianus and St. Probus. In the mid-13th century, the building underwent a major enlargement that led it to acquire a seven-aisle plan, and probably an orientation reversed from the original one, with the apse facing north instead of south. By 1049, on the other hand, the building of the baptistery, dedicated to St. John in Fonte, had been completed, located close to the northern side of the church, next to the bell tower.

The crypt of St. Erasmus, as a place of special popular devotion to the saint, was placed under the patronage of the civic magistrate of Gaeta who was responsible for the appointment of two procurators, one of whom was chosen from among the nobles, the other from among the merchants, who from 1515 onwards were four (two nobles, one merchant and one bourgeois). These procurators then, together with the city's judges, in turn appointed deputies for the organization of the feast of St. Erasmus (whose liturgical memory is June 2), which had a great gathering of people coming from the surrounding Gaeta localities also for the "buffalo hunt," an event derived from bullfighting, introduced under the Spanish domination of the city (1504–1734) and suppressed in 1862. Until the mid-16th century, the chapel's income consisted of the annual contribution paid by the civic magistrate for the feast of St. Erasmus, offerings from private individuals and fines imposed on violators of Gaeta's statutes; later it was the recipient of large public donations, the first of which was in 1559 from Bishop Antonio Lunello, which was followed in 1560 by one from the city, resulting in the establishment of an annuity to be paid in several installments.

=== The building of the crypt ===
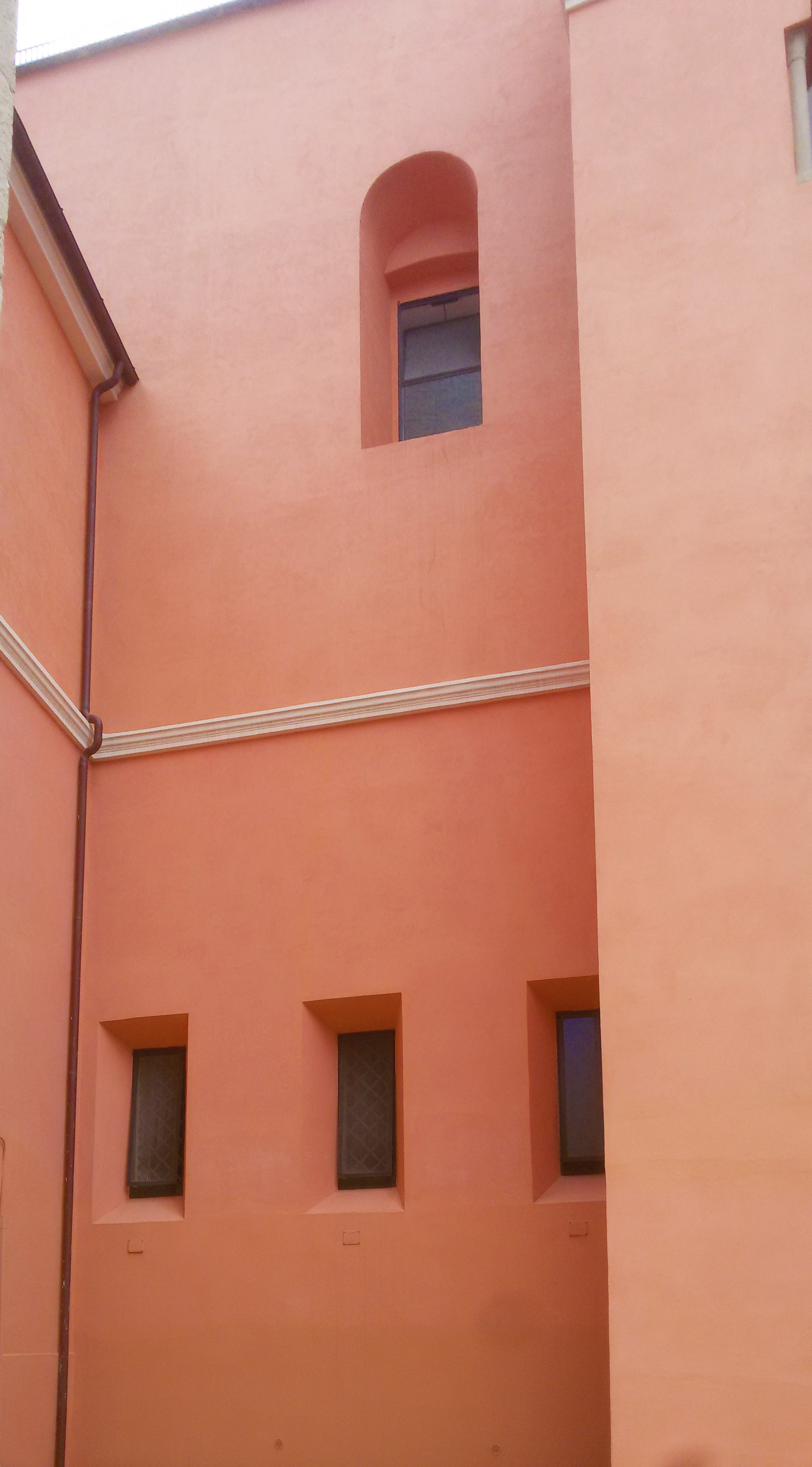
Exterior of the 16th-century apse with the rectangular windows of the crypt at the bottom.

In 1569, Bishop Pedro Lunello attempted to meddle in the control of the chapel in search of public funds to build a new choir for the cathedral to bring it in line with the directives of the Council of Trent, which, among others, called for an increase in the number of canons (which occurred in Gaeta in 1547); this action was not at all welcomed by the civic magistrate, who indeed revoked the previously promised funding; the disagreements between the bishop and the city were overcome in 1584 probably as a result of the inclusion in the project of a rebuilding of the crypt.

For the construction of the new choir and the underlying chapel of St. Erasmus, a number of houses behind the cathedral were demolished, which stood on the site of the ancient baptistery of St. John in Fonte, which by 1569 had already been found to be no longer in existence; the masonry of the body of the building was completed in 1586. New impetus for the work's completion was given by Alfonso Laso Sedeño, who became bishop of Gaeta in 1587; the work was financed by the municipality on several occasions beginning in 1589. In 1594 the bishop ordered that a canonical survey of the relics preserved in the crypt be made, which took place on October 24 in the presence of the city authorities and the prior of St. Dominic, who presided over the rite; from this it was revealed that inside two coffers were housed the remains of Saints Erasmus, Probus and Innocent as well as St. Marcian, respectively. In 1597 the new apse was blessed by the bishop of Fondi Giovanni Battista Comparini (since the Gaetan see was vacant due to the transfer of Alfonso Laso Sedeño to that of Cagliari), while the underlying chapel of St. Erasmus (popularly called "succorpo") remained unfinished. The new bishop of Gaeta Giovanni de Ganges, who had already been denied permission by the civic magistrate to visit the crypt in 1598 (a few months after his inauguration) in order to avoid interference in its administration, in 1600 "believing that he had the proper authority, officially asked the procurators of the chapel of St. Erasmus to hand over the books to him," and, faced with a new refusal from the city administration, excommunicated the procurators. New attempts to take control of the crypt were made by the bishop the following year, the only effect of which was the concession through a papal brief issued by Pope Clement VIII on May 2, 1603, to be able to celebrate a mass in the chapel on the feast of St. Erasmus. The crypt, by order of the civic magistrate, was officiated every Wednesday by a canon of the cathedral.

=== The seventeenth-century reconstruction ===
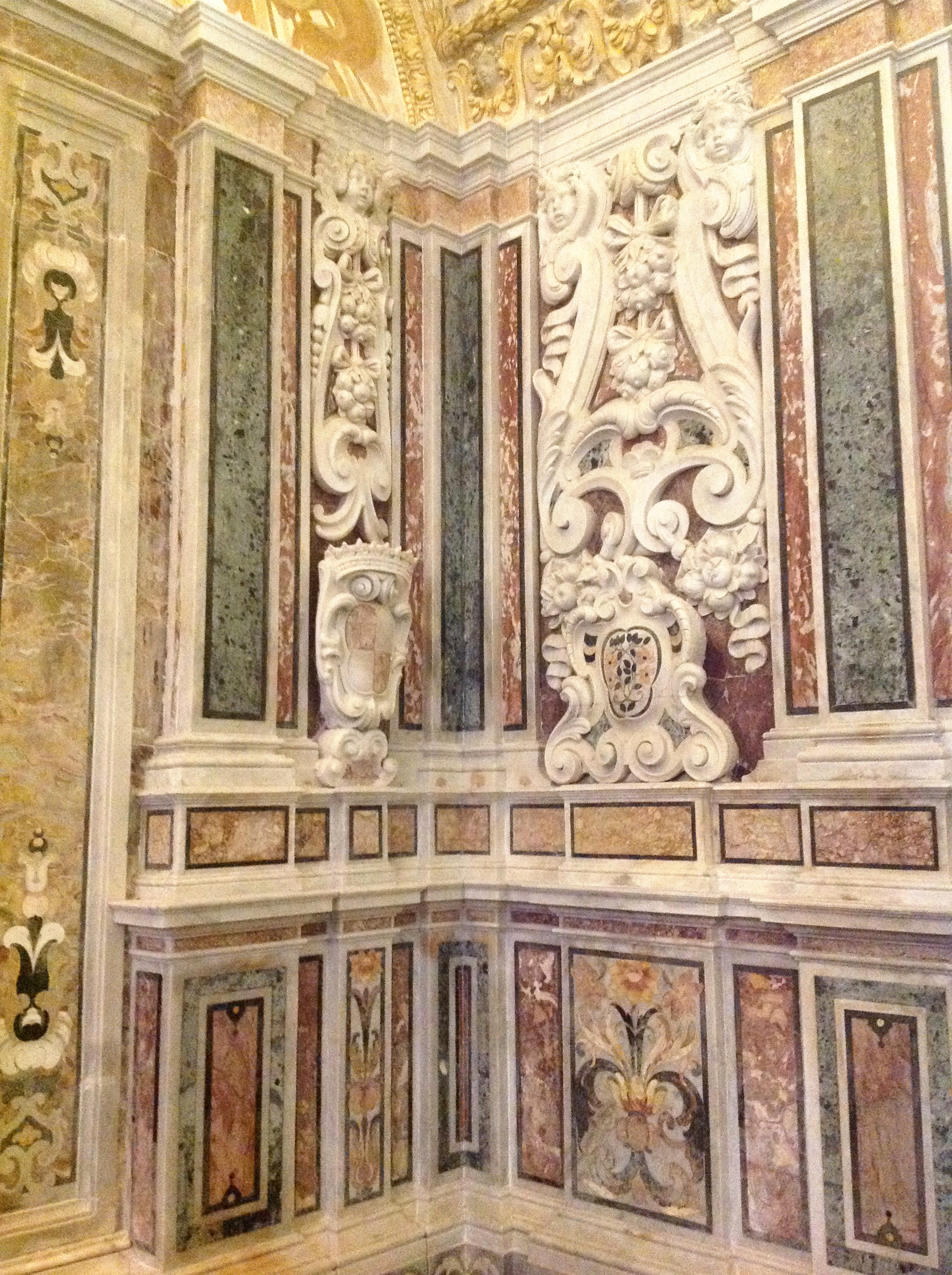
Detail of the seventeenth-century marble decoration of the walls.

The crypt was completed in 1607, the year the relics were moved there. The result was not deemed satisfactory by the city magistrate, so much so that as early as 1608 he asked Bishop Pedro de Oña, O. de M., to raise the vault, who refused both because of bad relations with the city administration (also due to his ambitions to control the chapel of St. Erasmus) and because such an operation would have entailed rebuilding the presbytery above, which had been inaugurated just 11 years earlier. Pedro de Oña upon his death (in 1626 would have liked to be interred inside the crypt, but this was denied him by the civic magistrate. In 1609, the two altars closest to it in the apse that held the remains of Saints Castus and Secondinus (right altar) and Saint Eupuria (left altar) were demolished and temporarily placed in the crypt inside a lead case; notably, the saint's relics had been the subject of a miraculous discovery inside the ancient cathedral of Santa Maria del Parco in May 918.

Work on the rebuilding of the crypt did not begin until 1617, and a commission was formed on April 1 of that year to oversee the operations. In March 1618, the demolition of some of the houses attached to the bell tower was financed to allow for the widening of the square in front that would allow easier access to the chapel. The original floor of the 16th-century chancel was also destroyed to allow the vault of the crypt to be raised by more than a meter.

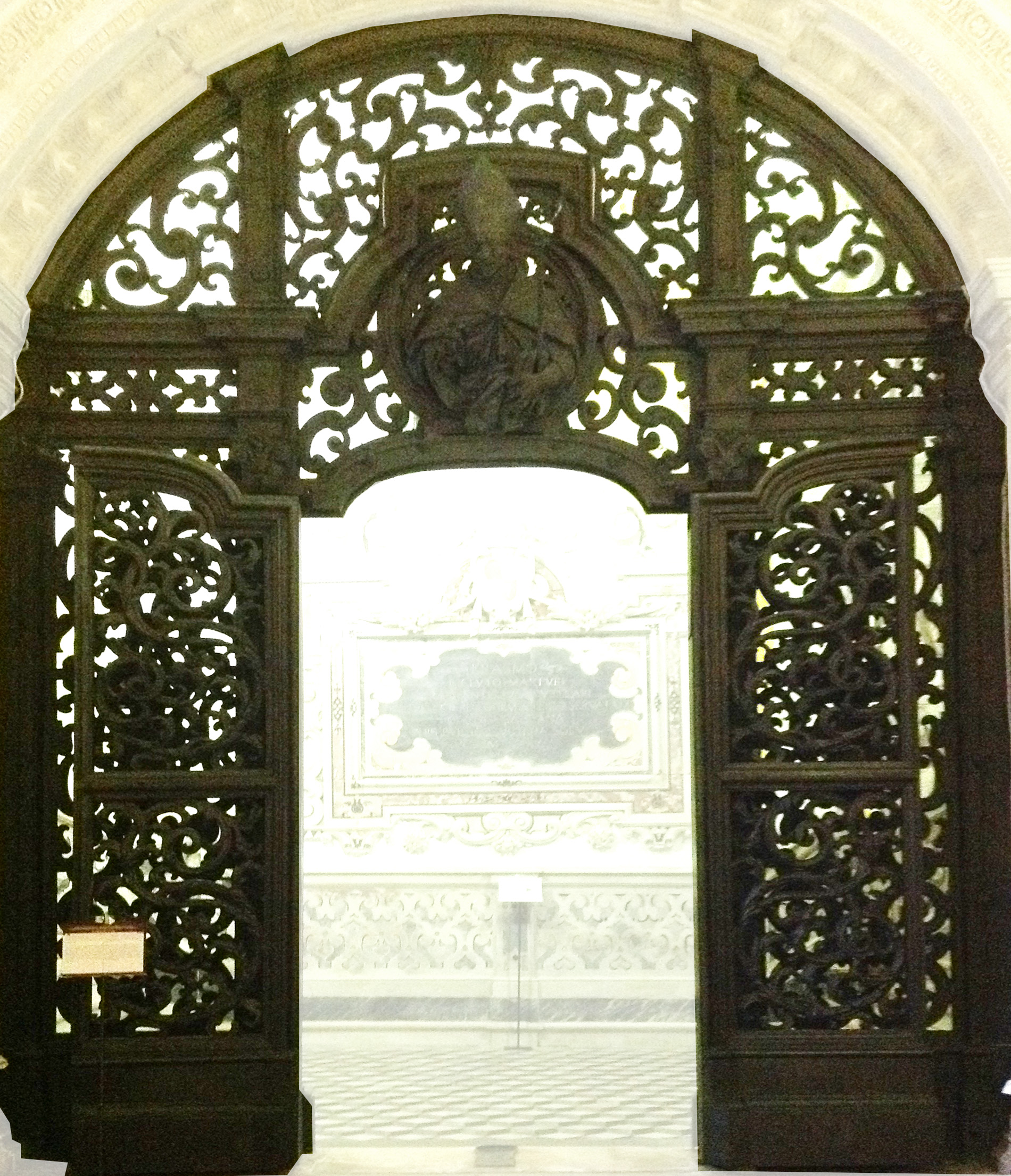
The bronze gate made by Antonio Perrella in 1700-1701.

In 1619 Jacopo Lazzari, a Florentine sculptor and marble worker active in Naples, was entrusted with the decoration of the interior masonry of the room; the following year the structure was to be finished although still lacking most of its decorations, since on April 9 the relics were solemnly transported there, demolishing the altar of the crypt that housed them. They were placed within two Roman sarcophagi from the third-fourth century: In the first a smaller sarcophagus containing the remains of Saints Erasmus, Probus and Innocent and a marble urn with those of Saint Marcianus were placed, while in the second another smaller sarcophagus with the remains of Saints Castus, Secondinus and Eupuria. Since there was no place for the relics of St. Albina in the altar of the crypt, they were placed under the mensa of the cathedral's high altar. It was the responsibility of the city to appoint and pay a priest as chaplain of the crypt, with an annual allowance for the cathedral sacristan to ring the curfew every night at 3 o'clock with a small bell. After the transfer of the saints' relics to the new chapel, the crypt was converted into a burial place for the canons of the cathedral, and, with the construction of the new neo-Gothic facade of the basilica (early 20th century) it was provided with independent access. Dionisio Lazzari, son of Jacopo (d. 1640), from 1644 onwards was responsible for the completion of the six niches, of which his father had made only four, intended to house the statues of the saints (which were originally to be made of marble), by 1655 for the making of the balustrade in polychrome marble, and for the construction of the double staircase and the access vestibule in about 1650; in 1666 an inscription was placed in the vestibule that was the result of a vow made by the city of Gaeta for having been spared the plague epidemic of 1656. The floor was commissioned in 1661 to Giuseppe Gallo who was then ordered to finish it in a short time because its execution had been deemed mediocre. Between 1662 and 1664 Giacinto Brandi painted the vault and the altarpiece (which replaced an earlier one that was deemed mediocre). In 1670 Dionisio Lazzari was responsible for the remaking of the marble altar frontal, while in 1689 the decoration of the access staircase was completed with the band in inlaid bichrome marble; in 1701 the monumental bronze gate was put in place.

=== The silver decorative apparatus ===
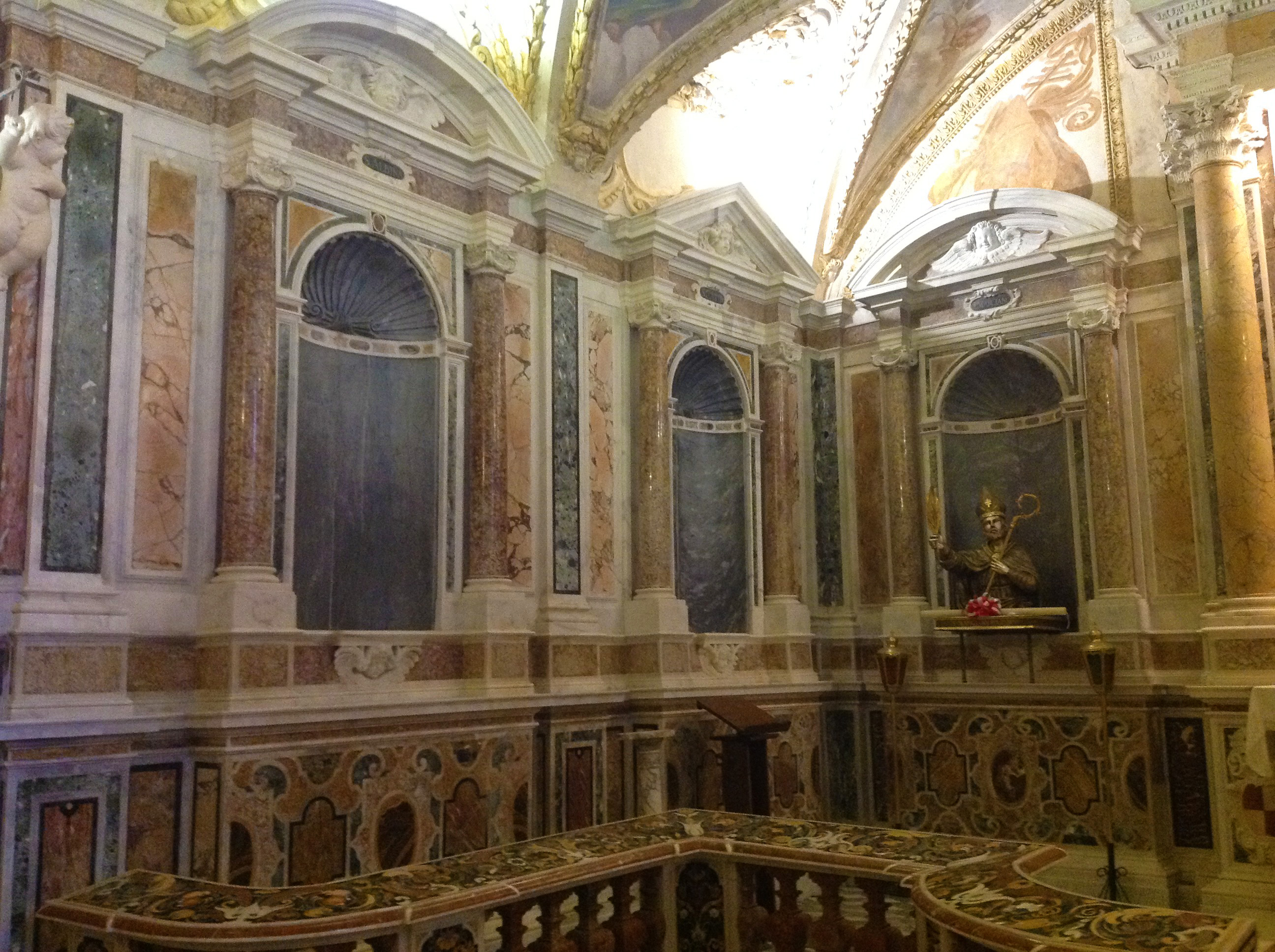
The left niches of the chancel that housed the silver statues of the saints (from left to right) Albina, Castus and Marcianus.

Beginning in February 1676, the annual financing by the municipality of Gaeta (derived from some taxes, first the snow tax and then the bread tax) of the silver sculptural decorative apparatus began. The making of the latter (consisting of the statues of the six saints buried in the crypt, the altar frontal and other furnishings) continued throughout the next century and had particular impetus during the episcopate of Gennaro Carmignani, C. R. (1738–1770). The entire apparatus (with the exception of the statues of St. Erasmus and St. Marcianus) was lost as a result of the 1798 requisition by the Kingdom of Naples, which melted them down, obtaining 130 kg for minting coins.

The earliest artifact, predating the crypt itself, was the statue of St. Erasmus (originally a bust), made around 1303 (the millennium of the patron's martyrdom) thanks to the benevolence of Charles II of Anjou by the royal silversmiths of Naples, to whom it had been commissioned by the city of Gaeta. The sculpture had a wooden supporting structure adorned with silver elements augmented over the centuries; the saint was depicted life-size, seated on a sumptuous Baroque throne with a canopy made in 1718, with a polychrome head and clad in the mitre and cope, with a 14th-century rationale bearing the engraved scene of Mary suckling the Child Jesus between two cerofer angels; he was depicted in a blessing attitude and holding a valuable crosier (also from the 14th century) with the Annunciation in the curl and, on the knot, Saints Innocent, Castus, Secondinus, Marcianus, and Eupuria. On the occasion of the festivities in honor of St. Erasmus, the statue was displayed on the cathedral's high altar built by Dionisio Lazzari in 1670-1683, which, above the tabernacle (made in 1710), still has the shelf prepared for the ostension of the simulacrum.

By 1690 it appeared that the silver altar furnishings, consisting of crucifix, candlesticks and altar cards, had been completed; they were kept in the house of one of the procurators of the crypt and used only on the feast of the patron saint. In 1695 the statue of St. Marcianus was made in silver by silversmiths Paolo and Antonio Perrella from a design by Lorenzo Vaccaro. The saint was depicted standing with the palm of martyrdom and a book in his left hand, and a crosier in his right; the latter, since the original one had been lost, was replaced in the 19th century with a wooden one and then in 1976 with Archbishop Francesco Niola's silver one, made in 1903 in neo-Gothic style. On the occasion of the requisition in the 18th century, the back of the silver cope worn by the saint was removed and replaced with a wooden board. In 1696 the statue of St. Innocent was made, while in 1719 that of St. Castus and in 1721 that of St. Secondinus. The original statues of St. Albina and St. Eupuria were made of wood, and were replaced in 1724 with as many made of silver, carved to the design of Domenico Antonio Vaccaro by silversmith Giovan Battista Buonacquisto assisted by Gioacchino Villani and Tommaso Treglia and chiseler Nicola Pisotti. The six statues, all life-size, were housed within as many marble niches placed along the walls of the chancel of the crypt and on either side of the altar.

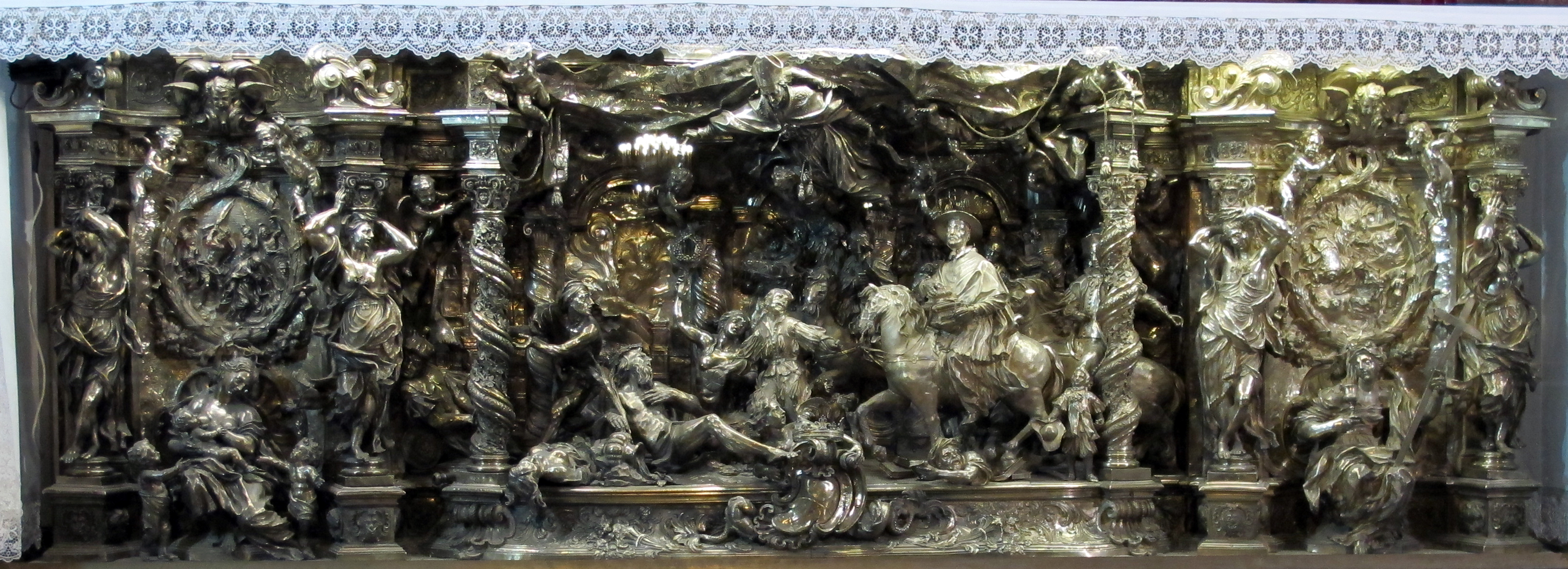
The silver antependium from the royal chapel of the Treasure of St. Januarius in Naples, after which the lost one from the crypt of Gaeta Cathedral was inspired.

In 1724 a new monstrance was purchased, and in 1741 numerous liturgical furnishings including lamps, candelabra and a crucifix for the altar. In 1749, a solid silver antependium was made for the altar, inspired by that of the high altar of the royal chapel of the Treasure of St. Januarius in Naples, the work of Giovan Domenico Vinaccia (1692–1695). The valuable artifact depicted the Transfer of St. Erasmus' body from Formia to Gaeta. The antependium and the statue of St. Erasmus were displayed exclusively during the annual celebrations for the patron saint.

Following the Bourbon requisition, the two surviving statues of St. Erasmus and St. Marcian were kept in the Treasure Chapel attached to the capitular sacristy. During World War II, the silver statues were transferred along with other works of art from the cathedral to the Vatican Apostolic Library to prevent their theft and returned to Gaeta in 1945. In 1973 the cope of St. Marcian was restored by reinstating its silver back. On the night of April 21-22, 1980, the two statues suffered a first theft: the statue of St. Erasmus was mutilated and various elements, including the blessing arm and the chiseled rationale, were removed, while the statue of St. Marcian was deprived of the neo-Gothic crosier; moreover, on the night of January 14-15 the following year both were stolen in their entirety with the exception of the polychrome head and part of the wooden throne of St. Erasmus and some shreds and the nineteenth-century crosier (which had replaced that of Archbishop Niola) of St. Marcian. A public fundraising campaign followed, which led to the creation of two new statues in silver-plated bronze by Erasmo Vaudo in 1984-1985; however, they never found their place in the crypt, but first inside the Cathedral, and since 2008 in its atrium.

=== Subsequent events ===
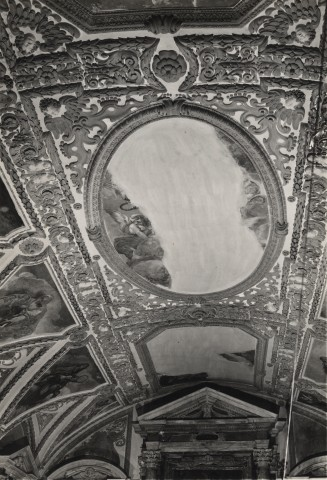
The vault of the crypt with the paintings damaged by the 1943 bombing.

During the following centuries the crypt did not undergo substantial alterations.

In 1715 Bishop José Guerrero de Torres, O.E.S.A. allegedly wanted to take possession of the silverware in the crypt, which is why it was entrusted by the civic magistrate of Gaeta to the nuns of San Montano; in 1718 Guerrero de Torres demanded to break into the administration of the crypt, but President Gaetano Argento firmly reaffirmed the city's exclusive patronage over the chapel. In 1820, the administration was entrusted to the town's congregation of charity, which was succeeded in 1851 by the public charity commission that later became the "Santissima Annunziata" public institute of assistance and charity. In 2003, together with the entire cathedral (except for the bell tower), the crypt was donated free of charge by the town of Gaeta to the archdiocese.

The chapel was equipped with a positive organ, which was disposed of during the 1950s; the presence of a pipe organ in the crypt is attested as far back as 1529. The crypt also had a harpsichord for the accompaniment of liturgies, which, on the occasion of the patron saint celebrations, was brought to the cathedral and used for the solemn pontifical on June 2; it was played by the cathedral organist until the crypt hired its own organist. It is possible that as part of some internal changes to the cathedral's furnishings promoted in 1828 by Bishop Luigi Maria Parisio, with the construction of a double staircase for access to the basilica's chancel in the nave, the hypothetical original seventeenth-century archway having the same width as the nave itself, which would have given light to the vestibule of the crypt, was reduced to a modestly sized lunette.

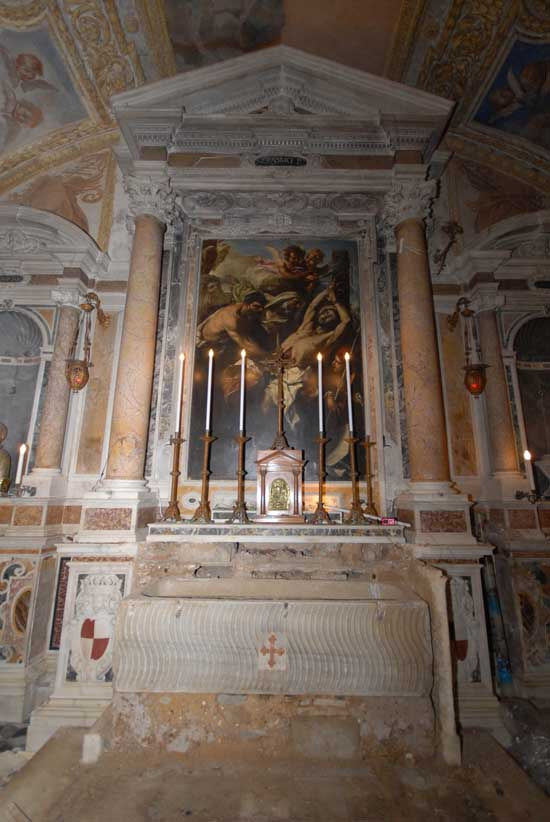
The altar during the canonical recognition in 2008.

On the night of September 8-9, 1943, the city of Gaeta was bombed by the German air force and a bomb hit the cathedral causing extensive damage; the crypt itself suffered the loss of part of the paintings of the vault, which were restored in 1952 and 2010-2014 without integrating the lost parts; while the panels with God the Father and Cherubs was irretrievably lost, in 2015 the one with the Glory of St. Erasmus, of which more pieces and a photographic record had been preserved, was reconstructed.

In 1971 five silver-plated wooden busts (four of Apostles and one of St. Januarius) and the marble urn with the remains of St. Montanus, from the church of St. Catherine of Alexandria, were placed inside the niches of the chancel walls that remained empty; they were later removed.

On April 25, 2008, a new canonical survey of the relics contained within the altar of the crypt was conducted by Archbishop Fabio Bernardo D'Onorio, O.S.B., and it was subsequently endowed with two reliquary busts depicting St. Erasmus and St. Marcianus. In the following years a silver lamp of Venetian origin from the 17th century was donated to the chapel. As part of the restorations that affected the entire cathedral and were completed in 2014, the mortal remains of the martyrs were transferred from the crypt to the presbytery together with the corresponding sarcophagi: the two smaller ones under the side arches; of the two larger ones, that of Saints Castus, Secondinus and Eupuria in place of the mensa of the altar of St. Joseph, the other instead as the new high altar.

== Description ==
=== Exterior ===
Externally, the crypt is in architectural continuity with the coeval apse above, both in the rear wall (with a wall face consisting of irregular exposed stones) and in the right side wall (plastered orange with a white cornice dividing it horizontally). It is devoid of decorative elements except for a niche that opens in the lower part of the rear wall, along Caetani Alley, with a brick arch supported by two marble corbels carved in relief, which accommodates against a wall in opus reticulatum the shaft of a reclaimed column surmounted by a modern icon of the Mother of God Glycophilousa.

=== Staircase and vestibule ===
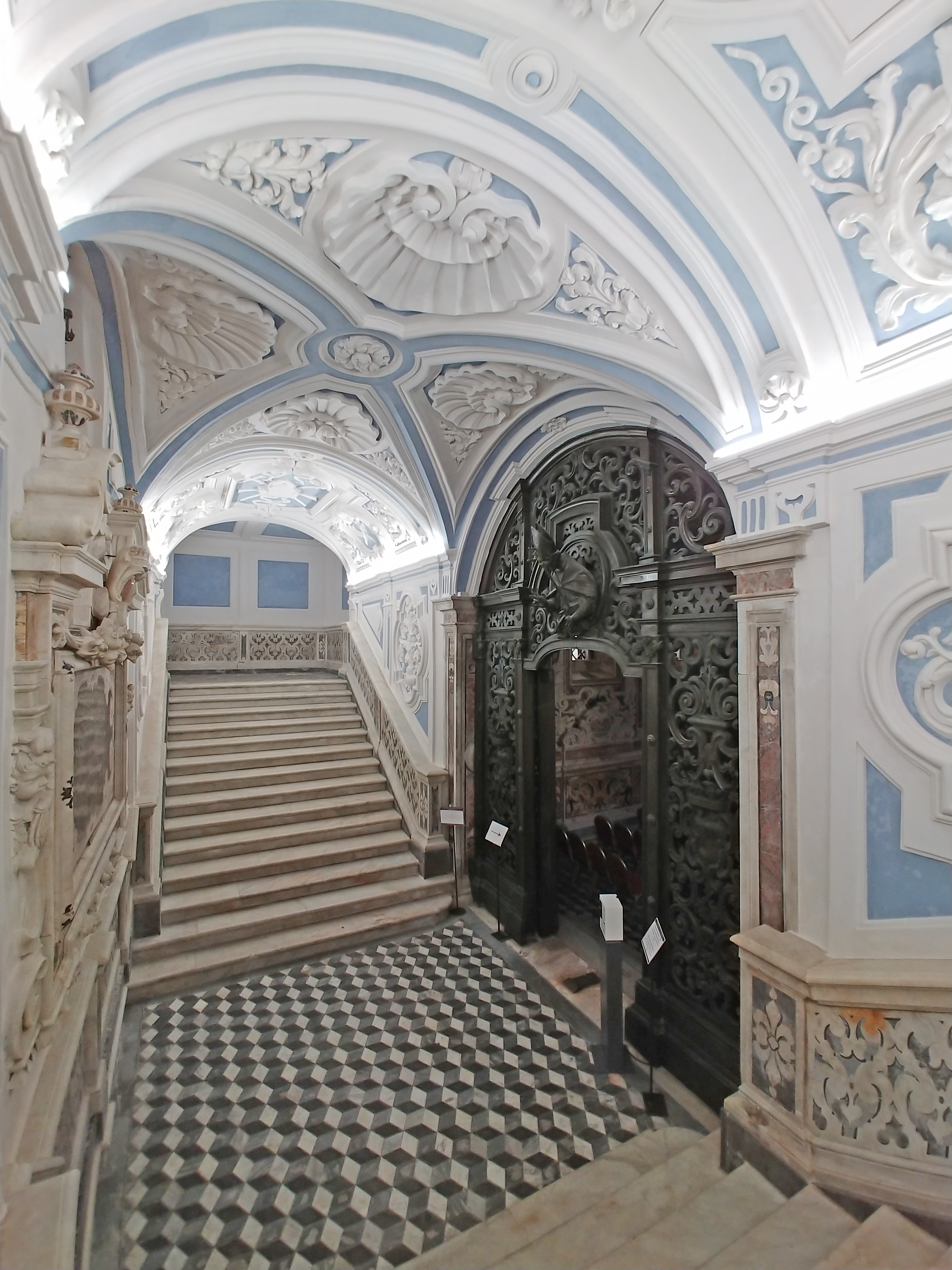
The staircase and vestibule.

Access to the crypt is exclusively from inside the cathedral, via a double staircase that consists of two symmetrical staircases at right angles, each with two flights of marble steps; the two upper flights lead into the third bay of the aisles and are placed parallel to the stairs that give access to the basilica's chancel, with nineteenth-century railings in gilded brass; the gates that close the stairs to the crypt originally featured the coat of arms of the city of Gaeta, later removed. The walls along the two ramps present, in the lower part, a bichromatic decoration in inlaid marble imitating an elaborate pierced parapet, made in 1689; in the upper part and on the vault, on the other hand, there are bas-relief stucco decorations, which along the upper ramps consist of simple geometric panels, along the lower ones of plant decorations and symbols of martyrdom within differently shaped fields. In the central field of the vault of the right ramp are intertwined two palms within a garland, while in that of the left ramp there is a mitre with a crosier and a processional cross crossed behind it; in the side fields are palms and crossed lilies. The staircases are illuminated by two rectangular windows that open outward at the intermediate landings.

The two staircases converge in the vestibule, with a quadrangular plan, centrally located below the front limit of the cathedral chancel. The room is lit by a round-arched window closed by a grille overlooking the nave of the basilica and opening on the wall opposite the entrance to the crypt. The vault is low cross vaulted and has the same exuberant stucco decoration as the lower flights of the double staircase, with a shell in the center of each web. Below the window, there is the plaque made in 1666 by the city of Gaeta as a thanksgiving to Saint Erasmus by the people of Gaeta for their salvation from danger during the plague of 1656; it is the work of Dionisio Lazzari who, according to the original idea later shelved, was to make a full-length statue depicting Saint Erasmus to be placed in the square in front of the cathedral bell tower. The plaque is in polychrome marble and has the following epigraph in gold lettering on a black marble background:

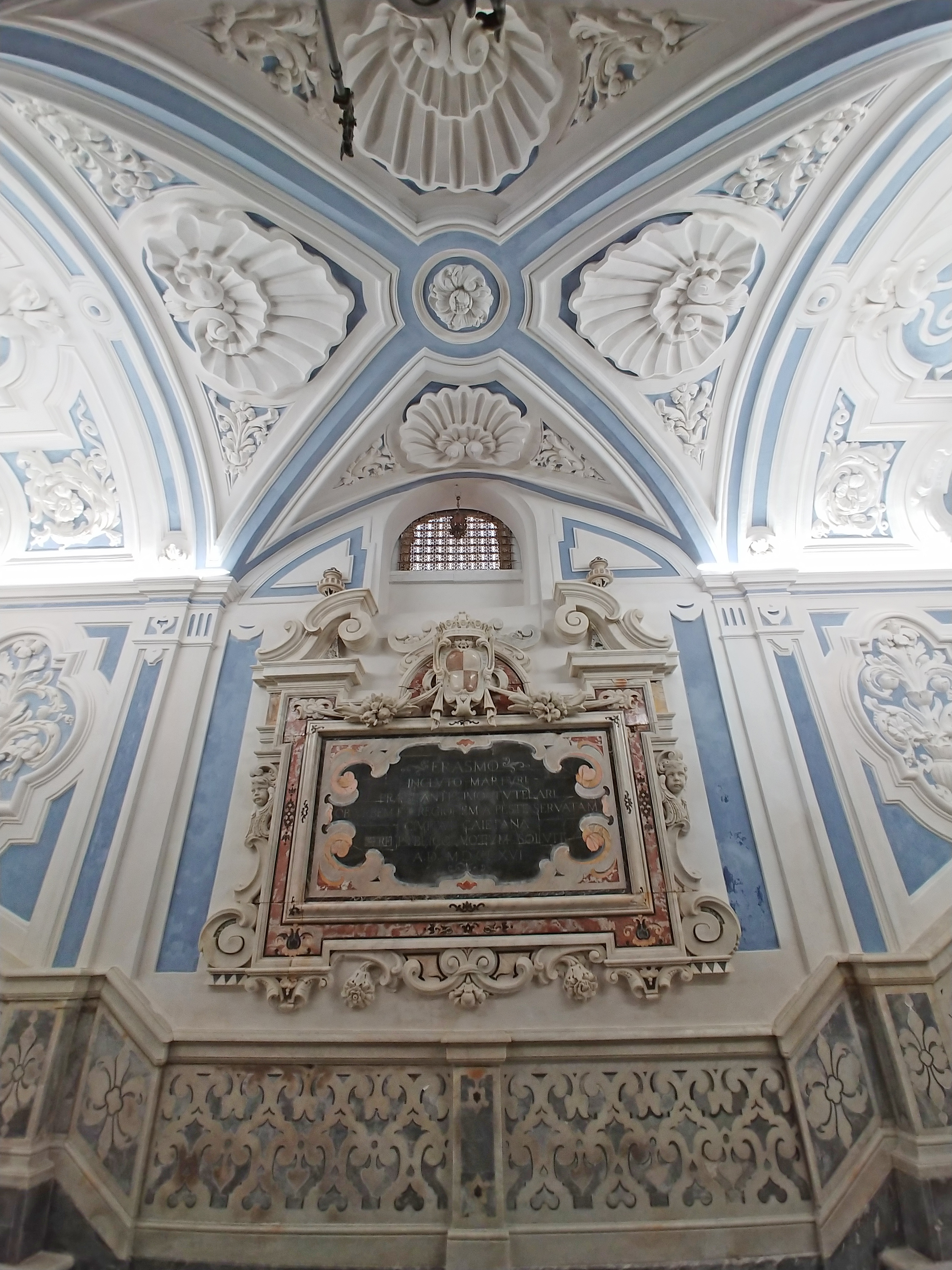
The vestibule with the 1666 plaque.

ERASMO

INCLYTO MARTYRI
PRÆSTANTISSIMO TUTELARI
OB REGIONEM ET VRBEM A PESTE SERVATAM
CIVITAS CAIETANA
ÆRE PVBLICO VOTVM SOLVIT

A.D. MDCLXVI
To Erasmus, distinguished martyr, excellent protector, who saved the region and the city from the plague, the city of Gaeta fulfilled the vow with public money in the year of our Lord 1666.

—Epigraph on the vestibule plaque.

The inscription is set within an elaborate frame adorned with inlays and reliefs including scrolls and two angel heads at the ends; the apical part consists of a broken tympanum with the Gaeta coat of arms in the center.

On the wall opposite that of the plaque is the entrance to the chapel, consisting of a wide lowered archway closed by a bronze gate made in imitation of Cosimo Fanzago's gate of the Royal Chapel of the Treasure of St. Januarius in Naples, (1630–1655). The Gaeta gate was made between 1700 and 1701 after it was decided in 1689 to replace the two iron and brass gates with gilded gaskets that closed the ramps with a single gate below the archway of the access to the crypt; the author of the artifact, already identified in the sphere of Giovan Domenico Vinaccia, is the Neapolitan Antonio Perrella. The sculpture is richly ornamented with volutes and is characterized by the presence above the double casement of the two-faced bust depicting Saint Erasmus in a blessing attitude inserted inside a central oculus.

=== Architecture ===
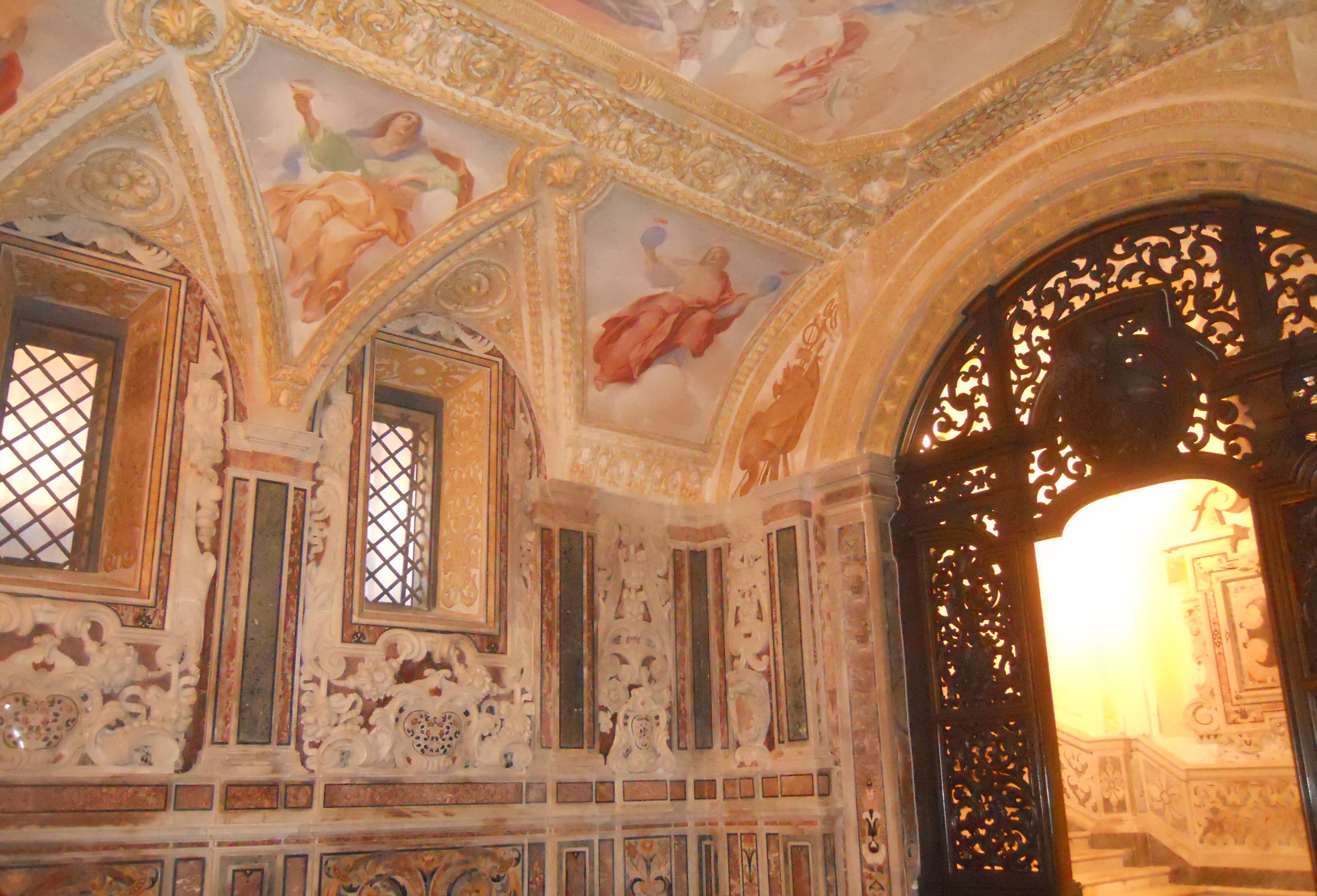
Interior of the crypt towards the entrance.

The crypt is entirely in the Baroque style. It consists of a single room with a rectangular plan covered with a lowered, lunetted barrel vault. Natural lighting is provided by six rectangular windows with deep splays that open symmetrically in the side walls, three on each side. There is no apse: the chancel, raised by two steps, occupies the end of the nave.

=== Marble decoration ===
The floor was made in 1661 by Giuseppe Gallo according to a design submitted by the same civic magistrate of Gaeta and redone by him in 1663 after his initial work had been judged mediocre; it features a simple geometric design composed of parallelepiped-shaped tiles made of marbles of three different colors: white, gray and black. The front part of the upper step of the chancel, in polychrome inlaid marbles, was instead made by Dionisio Lazzari at the same time as the balustrade.

The lower part of the walls in the area reserved for the faithful features marble decoration, also begun in 1663 by Giuseppe Gallo, who made the groups of lesenes that ideally unite the floor level with the base of the vault. Beginning in 1666 the intermediate panels that feature plant inlays in polychrome marble were carved by Dionisio Lazzari, while in 1673 the same artist began the creation of the exuberant relief decoration around the windows (for which marble was preferred to stucco as it was initially); this apparatus is also present on the counterfacade, on either side of the entrance arch, where two coats of arms of the city of Gaeta are affixed.

==== Presbytery ====
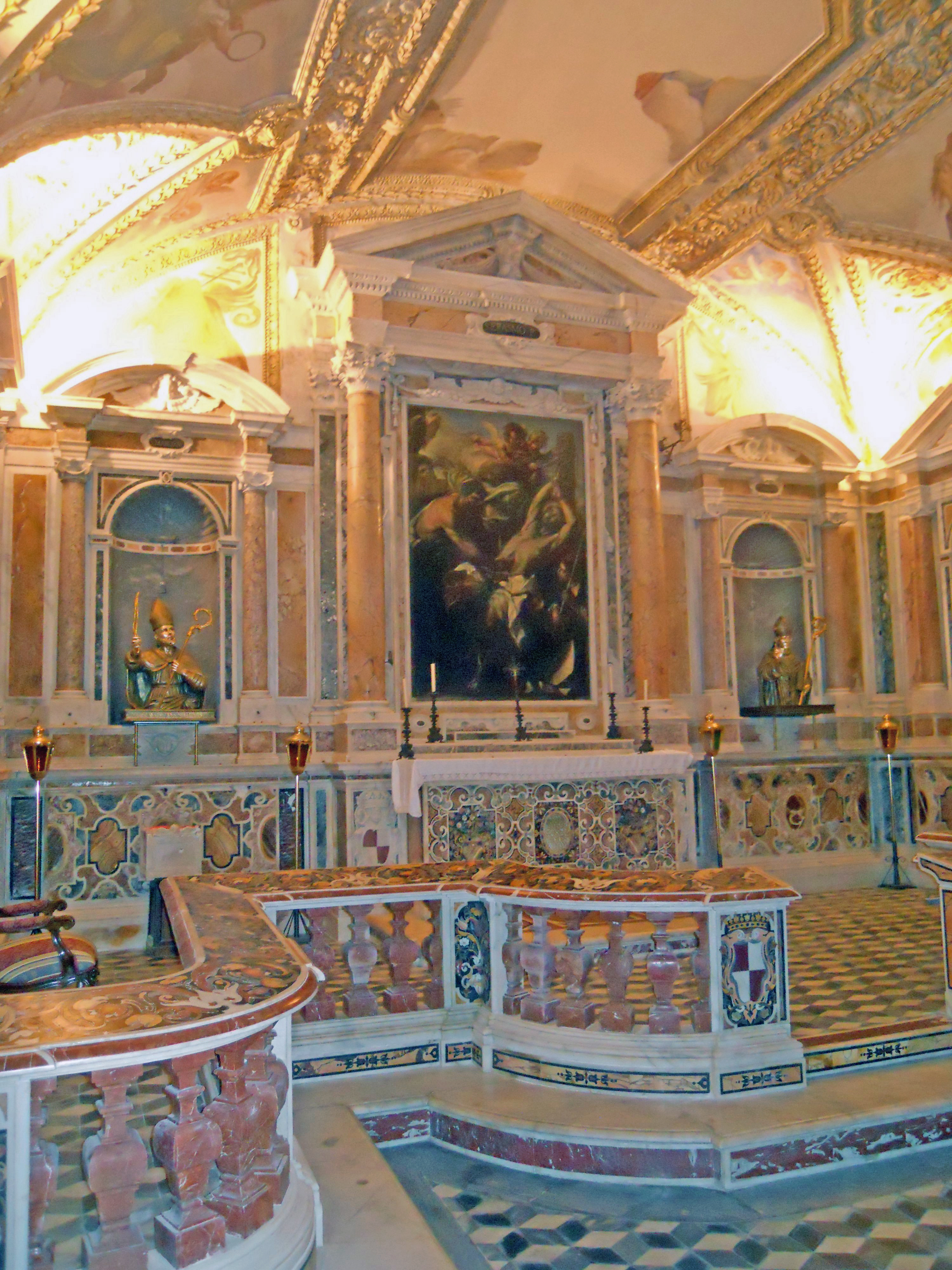
The presbytery.

The presbytery is bordered by the balustrade carved by Dionisio Lazzari between 1649 and 1655, the course of which follows that of the steps behind which it is placed for a length of about 11.35 m. It has a very elaborate decoration in inlaid polychrome marbles: on the upper part of the parapet there is a continuous intertwining of volutes and plant elements including flowers in lapis lazuli and nacre; the parapet is supported by balusters in red Palermo breccia and small pillars that, on the front, have inlaid flower vases and (those closest to the chancel entrance gate) the coat of arms of Gaeta.

In the walls of the chancel are the six niches designed to hold the statues of the inhumed saints in the crypt, two on the left wall, two on the back wall on either side of the altar, and two on the right wall; four of them were made by Jacopo Lazzari beginning in 1631 and were completed after his death by his son Dionisio beginning in 1644, who remained faithful to his father's design. Each has a semicircular hemicycle flanked by two Ionic columns with smooth shafts and a white marble base and capital, supporting an architrave with a black marble cartouche in the center bearing in gilded letters the name of the saint whose statue was in the niche; these statues (characterized by a reduced depth as they were designed to remain in their respective niches) were supported by a shelf with an angel's head and held by a hook placed at the base of the niche canopy, no longer present; from left to right, the statues were those of: St. Albina, St. Castus, St. Marcianus, St. Innocent, St. Secondinus (although the cartouche bears the name of St. Probus, who had no statue), and St. Eupuria. The architectural frame of each niche ends at the top with an alternating semicircular and triangular tympanum, in the center of which is an angel's head. Inside the two niches on either side of the altar are modern processional reliquary busts of Saints Erasmus (on the left, in the niche of St. Innocent) and Marcianus (on the right, in the niche proper).

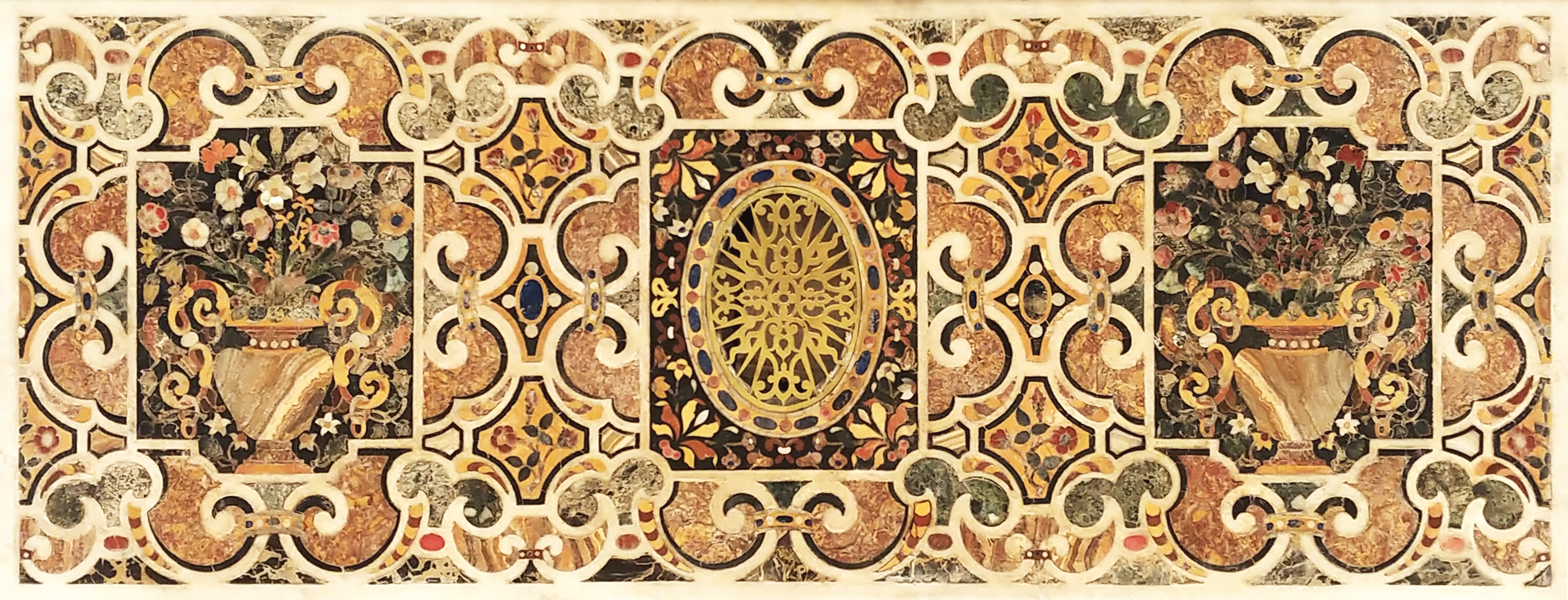
The marble altar frontal, by Dionisio Lazzari (1670).

Behind the back wall, in the center, takes place the altar made by Jacopo Lazzari by 1631. The mensa presents on the front a sumptuous antependium adorned with dense marble inlay decoration in polychrome marbles, the work of Dionisio Lazzari who made it in 1670: the ornamentation is articulated with volutes around three main fields, of which the two lateral ones with flower vases and the central one with an oval opening, closed by a coeval grating in gilded brass, at which was the red marble cross affixed in 1620 on the sarcophagus that contained that of Saints Erasmus, Probus and Innocent and the urn of Saint Marcian, itself converted in 2014 into the cathedral's high altar. Currently inside the altar is the marble urn with the mortal remains of St. Marcian, in the shape of a parallelepiped, the molded lid of which has the saint's name engraved on it. The altar is surmounted by a triangular white marble tympanum supported by smooth Corinthian columns and pilasters and bearing, on the lintel, the cartouche with the name of St. Erasmus, similarly to the six niches. The altarpiece is set within a marble frame decorated with reliefs depicting festoons, scrolls and an angel's head.

=== Pictorial decoration ===
==== Walls and vaulting ====
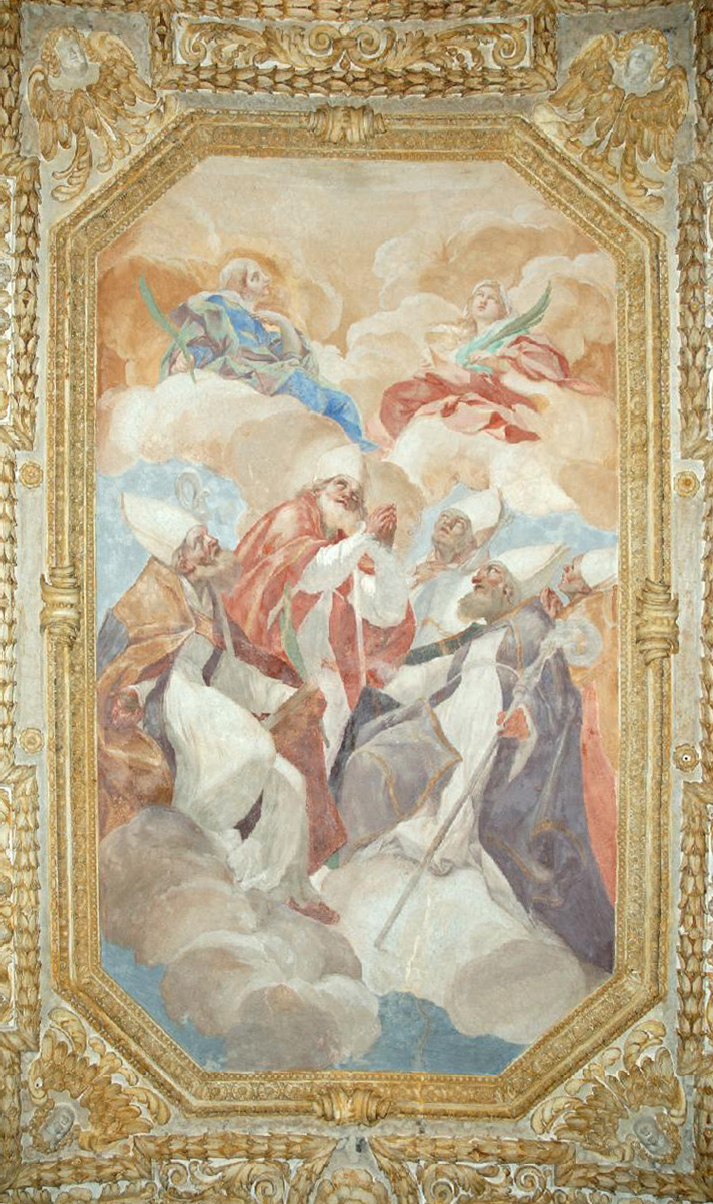
Glory of Saints Albina, Eupuria, Castus, Innocent, Marcianus, Probus, and Secondinus

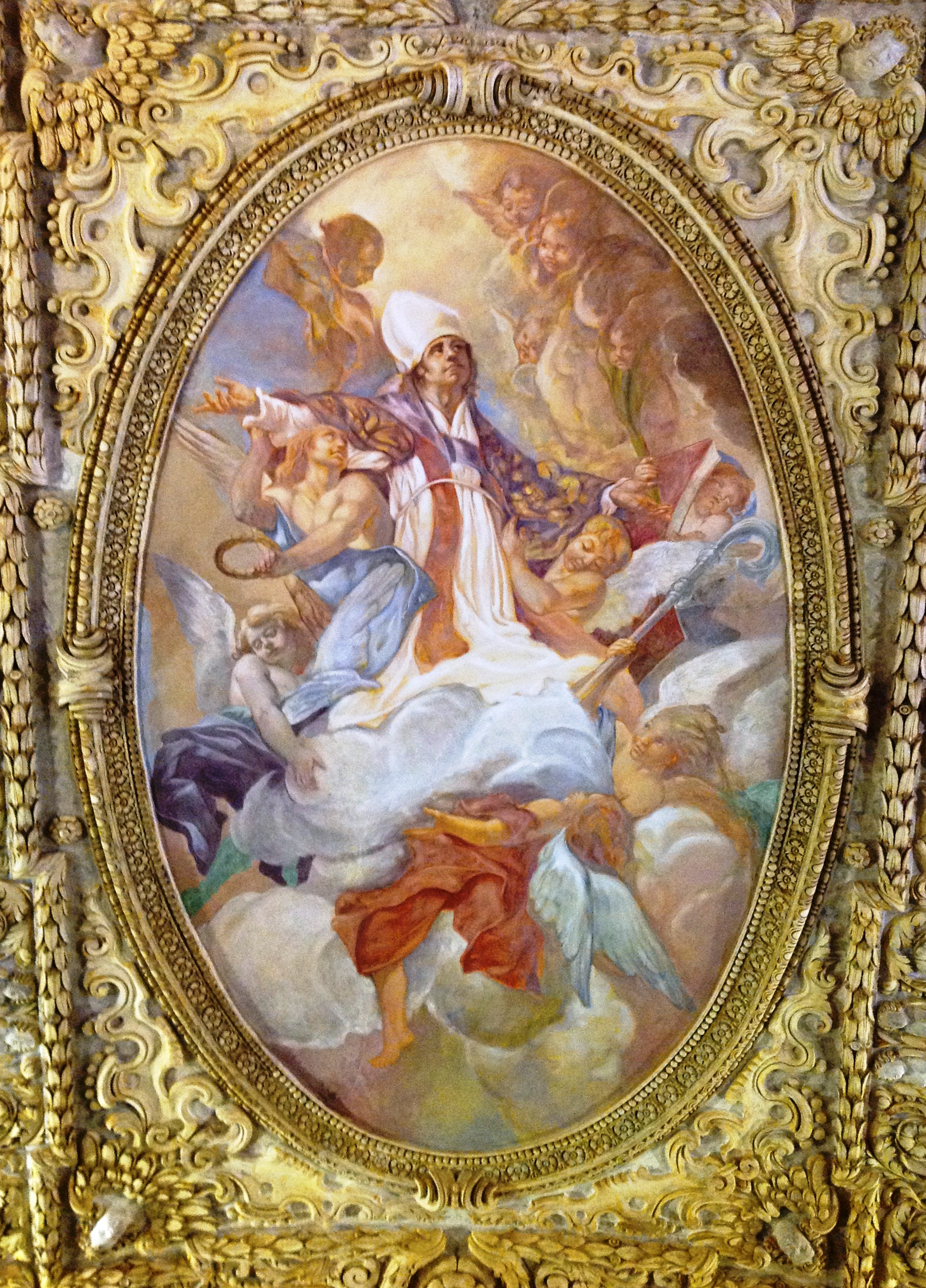
Glory of St. Erasmus

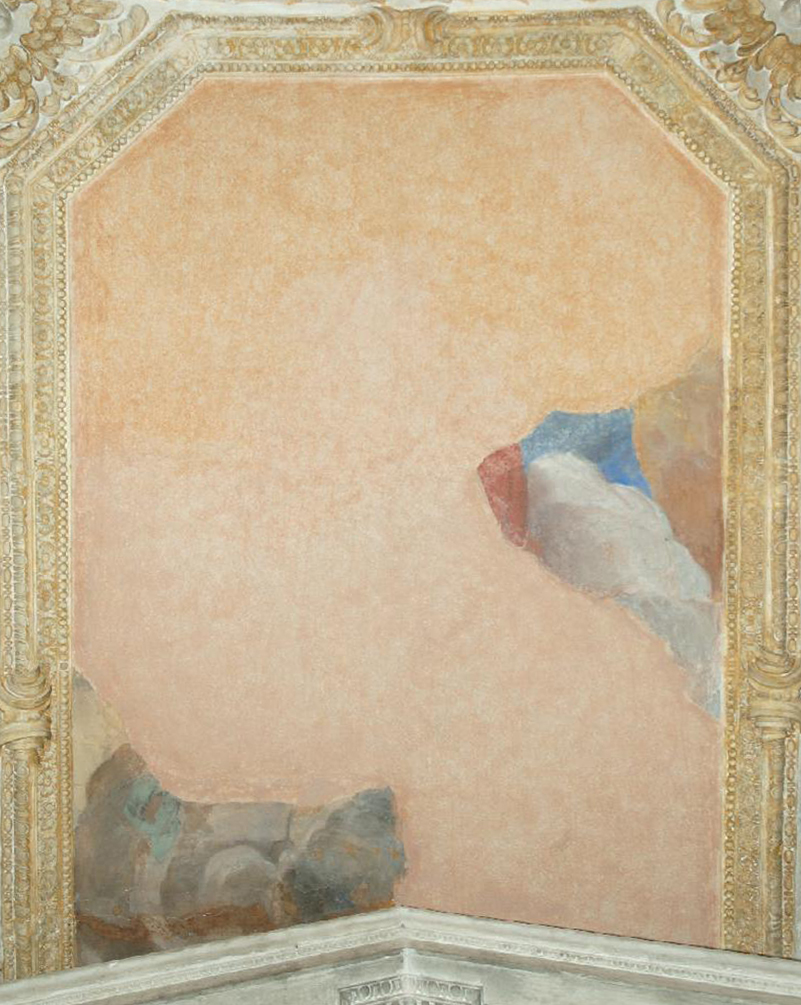
God the Father and cherubim (lost)

The pictorial decoration is developed throughout the upper part of the walls, in the intrados of the windows and on the vault, and is the work of Giacinto Brandi, who worked on it between the second half of 1662 and the end of 1663, with some important retouches to the webs during 1664. The paintings were not made with the fresco technique, but rather with the oil-on-wall technique; this technique was chosen by the painter, who was familiar with it having already used it several times, considering the scarcity of the height of the vault (and the consequent proximity to heat sources such as the flames of lamps and candles) and its better retention in a humid environment such as the crypt.

The wall decoration concerns the segments on either side of the entrance arch (with Roman Military Insignia), those on either side of the altar (with Episcopal Insignia) and the lunettes with Allegories of events in the life of St. Erasmus, mostly lost, above the niches of the saints. In the intradoses of the windows are grisailles with plant subjects, also by Brandi.

The vault has a rigid late Mannerist geometric division in stucco originally gilded with gold leaf, within which Brandi made the pictorial apparatus, limiting himself to enlarging the fields of the webs in order to make full-length rather than half-length figures of the subjects within them. Along the median axis of the vault are three large panels. The one closest to the entrance, octagonal in shape, features the Glory of Saints Albina, Eupuria, Casto, Innocent, Marcianus, Probus and Secondinus, and is the only one of the three central paintings to remain unharmed by the bombing in 1943; at the top are the two saints, seated on clouds holding the palm of martyrdom, while at the bottom are the other martyrs depicted as bishops without any particular distinguishing marks that would allow one to distinguish them from the other. The central panel is oval and bears the Glory of St. Erasmus, reconstructed in 2015 on the basis of photographic evidence; the composition is characterized by "a strong Correggesque matrix" and presents in the center the saint clad in the vestments and mitre surrounded by numerous angels, some of whom bear various objects including the palm of martyrdom, the crosier, and the crown of victory reserved for martyrs. The panel above the chancel, also octagonal, is extremely incomplete and depicted God the Father with cherubim. In the webs that are interspersed with the lunettes are depicted the ten allegories of the Virtues specific to St. Erasmus, in the form of personifications, while in those behind the altar are Cherubim. The virtues depicted, for which the painter made a synthesis of already existing models (particularly those codified in his Iconology by Cesare Ripa in 1603) and of new meanings he devised, are (from the entrance to the altar):

Left side
Modestia Modesty	Prudenza Prudence	Fede Faith	Carità Charity	Eternità Eternity	Putti Putti
Right side
Divinità Divinity	Sapienza Wisdom	Fortezza Fortitude	Umiltà Humility	Penitenza Penance	Putti Putti

The panel of the Modesty bears, in the lower right corner, the artist's signature in large letters: HYACİ.S BRAND.S.

==== Altarpiece ====
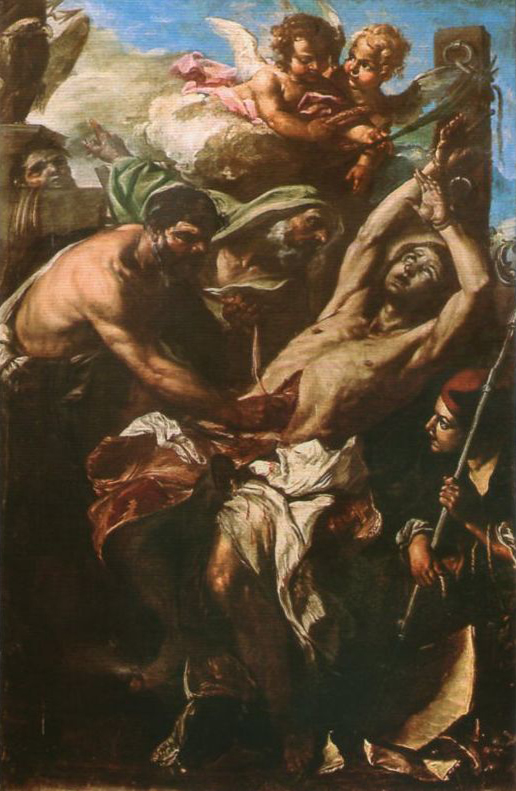
Martyrdom of Saint Erasmus.

In the center of the altarpiece is an oil on canvas of the Martyrdom of Saint Erasmus, also by Giacinto Brandi; the painting was commissioned from the painter in 1663 to replace an earlier one deemed unsuitable for the new decoration of the chapel, which featured the same scene; the sketch was approved later that year by the civic magistrate of Gaeta, and the work was completed within 1664. The altarpiece of the crypt right from the start was the object of such lively public enthusiasm that it became, according to biographer Filippo Baldinucci, one of the main attractions of the city, and together with the other works created in Gaeta it helped to increase the artist's fame. Later a lesser quality copy of Brandi's canvas was painted, which is located at the Santissima Annunziata in Gaeta and was heavily damaged during World War II.

Giacinto Brandi took as his model the altarpiece with the same subject painted by Nicolas Poussin for the altar of St. Erasmus at St. Peter's Basilica in the Vatican in 1628 and currently on display at the Vatican Pinacoteca. The scene, the tragic nature of which is conveyed through the use of dark hues, has an accentuated plasticity of the bodies and gives special attention to the psychology of the characters: in the center is the saint who, tied to a pole, is undergoing evisceration by the executioner who stands on the left; on the lower right, a persecutor holds up the martyr's episcopal insignia, while above are angels ready to receive the bishop's soul; bending over St. Erasmus is an elderly priest, recognizable by the white robes in which he is wrapped, who orders him in vain to worship idols. Compared to Poussin's painting, any reference to classical culture and pagan religion is absent in order to better emphasize the dramatic nature of the martyrdom; moreover, the composure adopted by the French painter is replaced by an exaggerated naturalism in the Hispano-Campanian tradition, while the strong dramatic tension recalls the canvas Forty Martyrs of Sebaste, painted a few years before the Gaeta altarpiece by Brandi for his own family chapel in the church of the Santissime Stimmate di San Francesco in Rome.

== See also ==
- Gaeta Cathedral
- Dionisio Lazzari
- Giacinto Brandi
- Erasmus of Formia
- Marcian of Syracuse

== Bibliography ==
- Allaria, Giuseppe (1970). Le chiese di Gaeta. Latina: Ente Provinciale per il Turismo, Camera di Commercio.
- Arcidiocesi di Gaeta, ed. (2008). Sant'Erasmo, testimone di Cristo, nostro Patrono. Formia: Graficart.
- Capanni, Fabrizio; Giampiero Lilli, eds. (2015). Le cattedrali del Lazio. L'adeguamento liturgico delle chiese madri nella regione ecclesiastica del Lazio. Cinisello Balsamo: Silvana.
- Capobianco, Paolo (2006). La cattedrale di Gaeta. Cenni del 900º anniversario della consacrazione. Fondi: Arti Grafiche Kolbe.
- Catalano, Dora (2015). "Argenti sacri da Napoli e dal meridione: presenze nel Lazio tra XVI e XVIII secolo". In Benedetta Montevecchi (ed.). Sculture preziose. Oreficeria sacra nel Lazio dal XIII al XVIII secolo. Roma: Gangemi. pp. 55–66. ISBN 978-8-8492-8034-0.
- Codex Diplomaticus Cajetanus. Vol. III. Isola del Liri: Pisani. 1969 [1858].
- De Santis, Angelo. "La Cattedrale di Gaeta nei secoli XVII e XVII". Bollettino dell'Istituto di Storia e di Arte del Lazio Meridionale (VII). Roma: Casa di Nicola Crescenzo.
- d'Onofrio, Mario (1996–1997). "La cattedrale di Gaeta nel medioevo". Rivista dell'Istituto Nazionale d'Archeologia e Storia dell'Arte (19-20 (3ª serie)). Roma: L'Erma di Bretschneider: 227–249. ISSN 0392-5285.
- d'Onofrio, Mario; Gianandrea, Manuela, eds. (2018). Gaeta medievale e la sua cattedrale. Roma: Campisano. pp. 571–580.
- Federici, Giovanni Battista (1791). Degli antichi duchi e consoli o ipati della città di Gaeta. Napoli: Vincenzo Flauto.
- Ferraro, Salvatore (1905). La Colonna del Cereo Pasquale di Gaeta. Contributo alla Storia dell'Arte medioevale. Napoli: Tipografia Francesco Giannini & Figli.
- Ferraro, Salvatore (1903). Memorie religiose e civili della città di Gaeta. Napoli: Tipografia Francesco Giannini & Figli.
- Fiengo, Giuseppe (1971). Gaeta: monumenti e storia urbanistica. Napoli: Edizioni scientifiche italiane.
- Fronzuto, Graziano (2001). Monumenti d'arte sacra a Gaeta: storia ed arte dei maggiori edifici religiosi di Gaeta. Gaeta: Edizioni del Comune di Gaeta.
- Gaetani d'Aragona, Onorato (1885). Memorie storiche della città di Gaeta (2 ed.). Caserta: Stabilimento tipo-litografico della Minerva.
- Giordano, Alberto (1972). La cattedra episcopale di Gaeta. Gaeta: Centro Storico Culturale.
- Macaro, Carlo (2008). La Diocesi di Gaeta nel '700. Fondi: Tipolitografia C.O.R.E.
- Serafinelli, Guendalina (2011). La decorazione pittorica di Giacinto Brandi nella cripta del duomo di Sant'Erasmo in Gaeta: nuovi documenti e letture iconografiche. Arte Documento. Venezia: Marcianum Press. pp. 132–141. ISSN 1121-0524.
- Serafinelli, Guendalina (2015). Giacinto Brandi (1621–1691). Catalogo ragionato delle opere. Torino: Umberto Allemandi.
- Sorabella, Lino (2014). Ecclesia Mater. La Cattedrale di Gaeta. Marina di Minturno: Caramanica Editore.
- Tallini, Gennaro (2006). Gaeta: una città nella storia. Gaeta: Edizioni del Comune di Gaeta.
- Tallini, Gennaro (2013). Vita quotidiana a Gaeta nell'età del viceregno spagnolo. Gaeta: Centro Storico Culturale "Gaeta".
