= Vinaccia =

Vinaccia is a surname. Notable people with the surname include:

- Giovan Domenico Vinaccia (1625–1695), Italian architect, goldsmith, engineer, and sculptor
- Pasquale Vinaccia (1806–c.1882) Italian luthier and instrument-maker
- Paolo Vinaccia (1954–2019), Italian musician
