= San Giuseppe dei Ruffi =

Church of San Giuseppe dei Ruffi
- Chiesa di San Giuseppe dei Ruffi
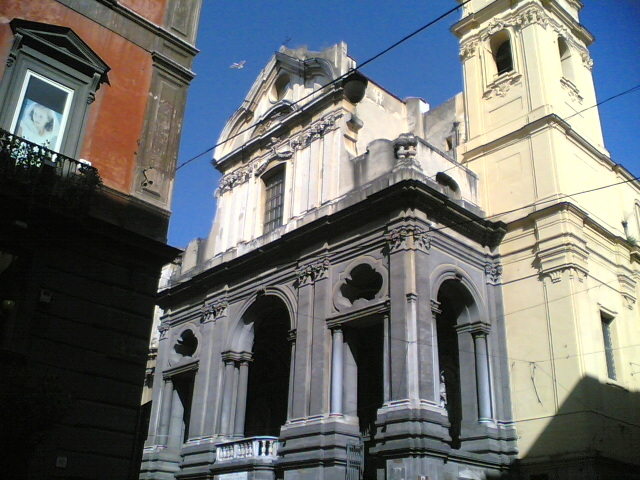
- The façade of San Giuseppe dei Ruffi.
- Church of San Giuseppe dei Ruffi
- 40.853410°N 14.258060°E
- Location: Naples; Province of Naples, Campania
- Country: Italy
- Denomination: Roman Catholic

History
- Status: Active

Architecture
- Architectural type: Baroque architecture

Administration
- Diocese: Roman Catholic Archdiocese of Naples

San Giuseppe dei Ruffi or church of San Giuseppe dei Ruffo is a church located on piazzetta San Giuseppe dei Ruffi, in Naples, Italy.

== History ==
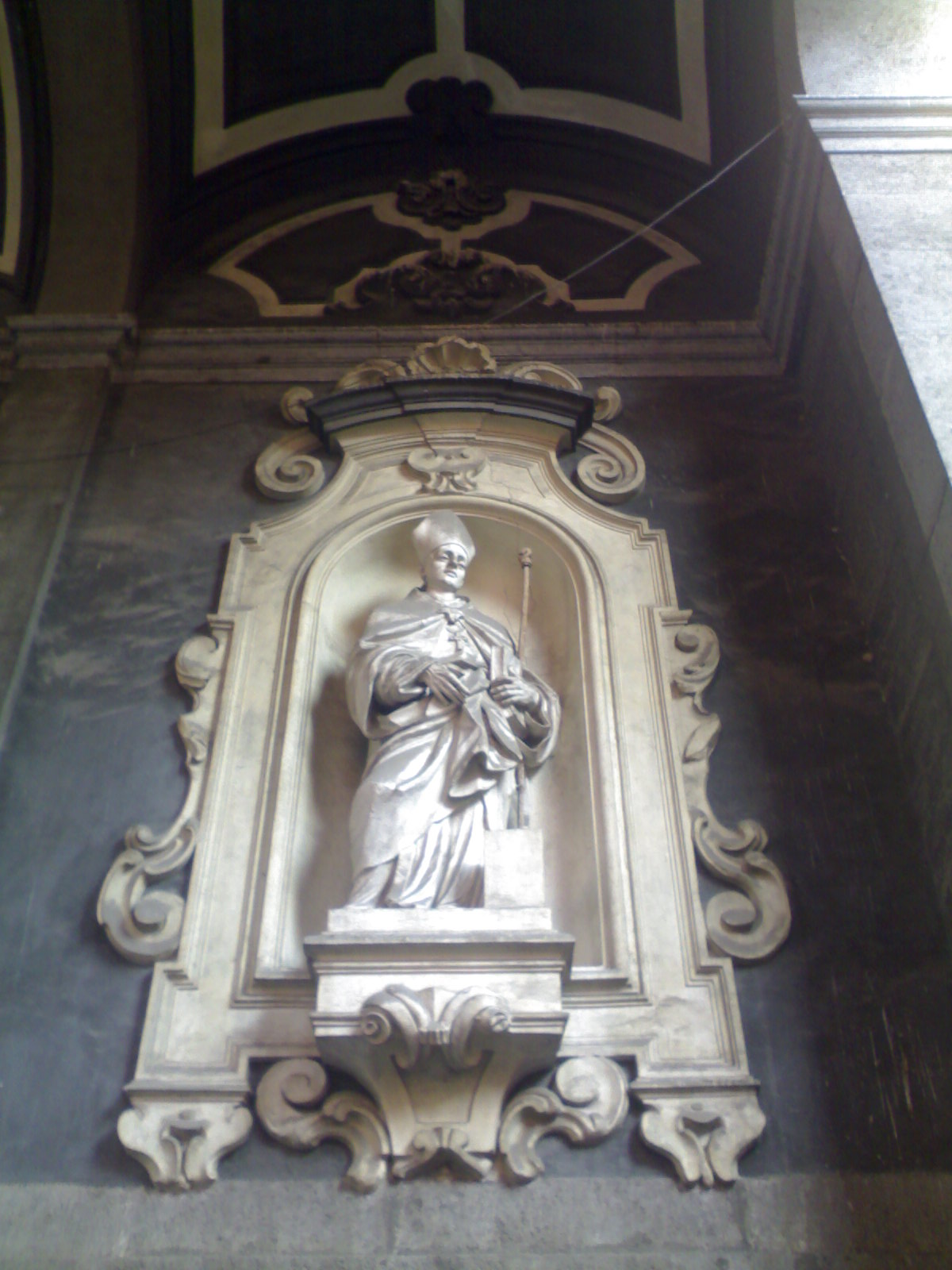
Statue from entrance by Sanfelice

The church was part of an Augustinian order monastery founded in 1604 by a group of aristocratic Neapolitan noblewomen: including Cassandra Caracciolo; Ippolita and Caterina Ruffo; and Caterina Tomacelli. They obtained from the Prince of Avellino, the old palace of the family Arcella, and surrounding houses, to build their monastery and church.

In 1611, more nuns transferred here from the convent of Santa Maria degli Angeli, renaming the convent San Giuseppe; a few years later they decide to build a new church and cloister. The project from 1630 was directed by Dionisio Nencioni di Bartolomeo, who was also the architect for the church of the Girolamini. By 1636, nearly all the cloister was complete.

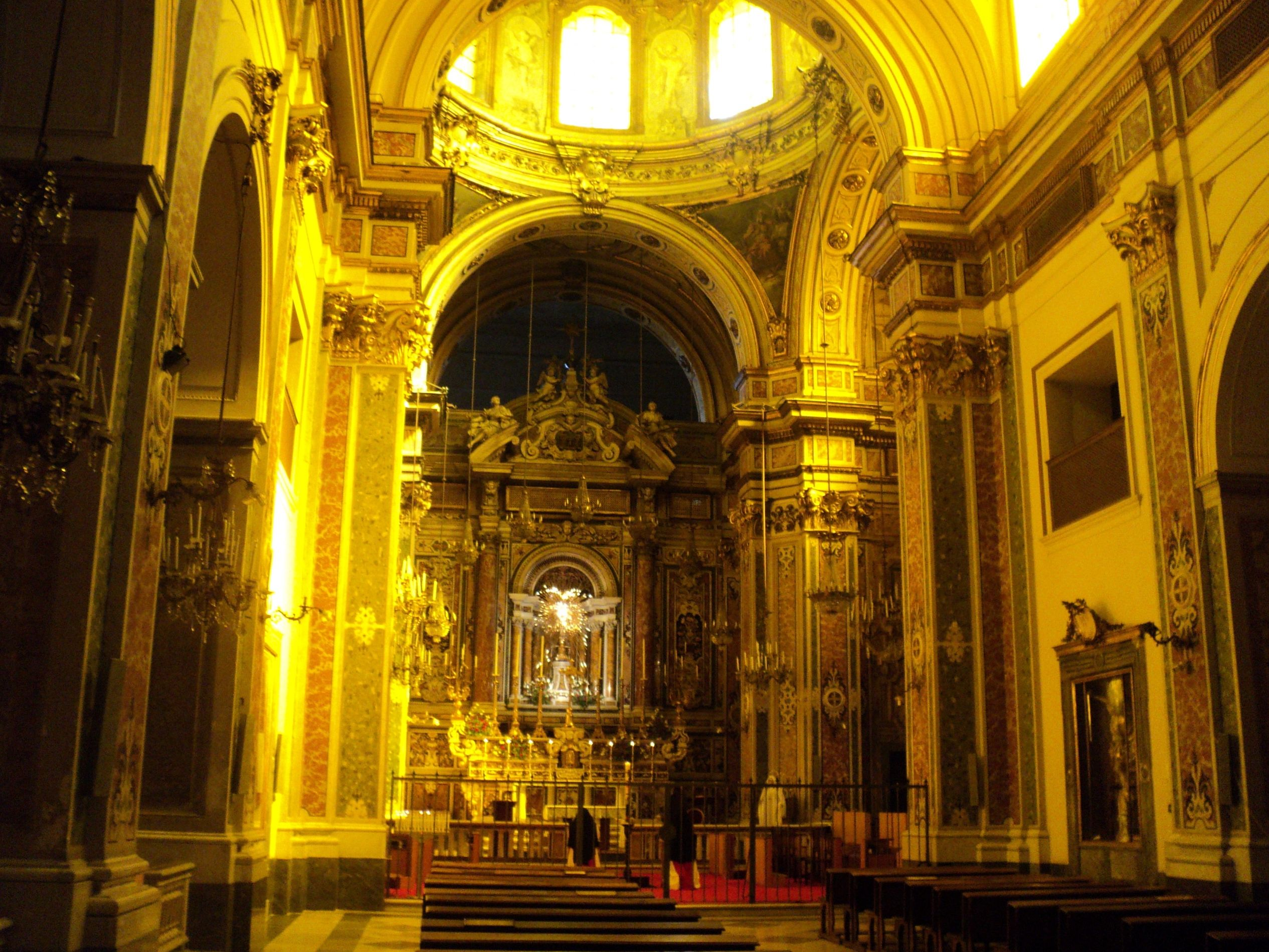
Interior.

In 1699, construction of a church began using designs by Dionisio Lazzari, a second cupola was added by Arcangelo Guglielmelli in 1720, while in 1734 the third dome was added. From 1681-1686, the nave of Latin cross plan was completed, and the main altar was designed by Lazzari with sculptures by Matteo Bottiglieri; the altar of the right transept was designed by Guglielmelli and houses a Holy Family painted by Pomarancio; the altar of the left transept was sculpted by Bartolomeo and Pietro Ghetti, designed by Vinaccia, and has statues by Giuseppe Sammartino and the Ghetti brothers, and hosts a painting by Luca Giordano. The cupola was frescoed by Francesco de Mura; a chapel on the left has a Crucifixion by Giacinto Diano.

The second chapel to the right is dedicated to St Ruffo, and the chapel has plaques commemorating the valiant actions of Admiral Fabrizio Ruffo, Duke of Bagnara, (born 1619) against the Turks in Malta.

At his death in 1689, his colleague Guglielmelli completed the nave, and began work for the atrium, whose construction lasted until 1725 following the disruptions of 1722 caused by some disputes between the neighboring monasteries. Guglielmelli in his work was assisted by his son Marcello. Marcello after the death of his father in 1723, was soon replaced by Nicola Tagliacozzi Canale, who repaired the earthquake damage, and decorated the interior with inlaid marble. To cope with the structural instability following earthquakes, Mario Gioffredo was named engineer of the convent. In the 19th century with the creation of the via Duomo, one side of the cloister was eliminated.

The facade with a protruding portico, preceded by a staircases. The tympanum appears influenced by the Baroque architecture of Borromini.

== Bibliography ==
- Antonio Terraciano, Andrea Russo, Le chiese di Napoli. Censimento e brevi recensioni delle 448 chiese storiche della città di Napoli, Lorenzo Giunta Editor, 1999.
- Vincenzo Regina, Le chiese di Napoli. Viaggio indimenticabile attraverso la storia artistica, architettonica, letteraria, civile e spirituale della Napoli sacra, Newton and Compton Editor, Naples 2004.
