= Saint Januarius Emerges Unscathed from the Furnace =

1646 painting by José de Ribera

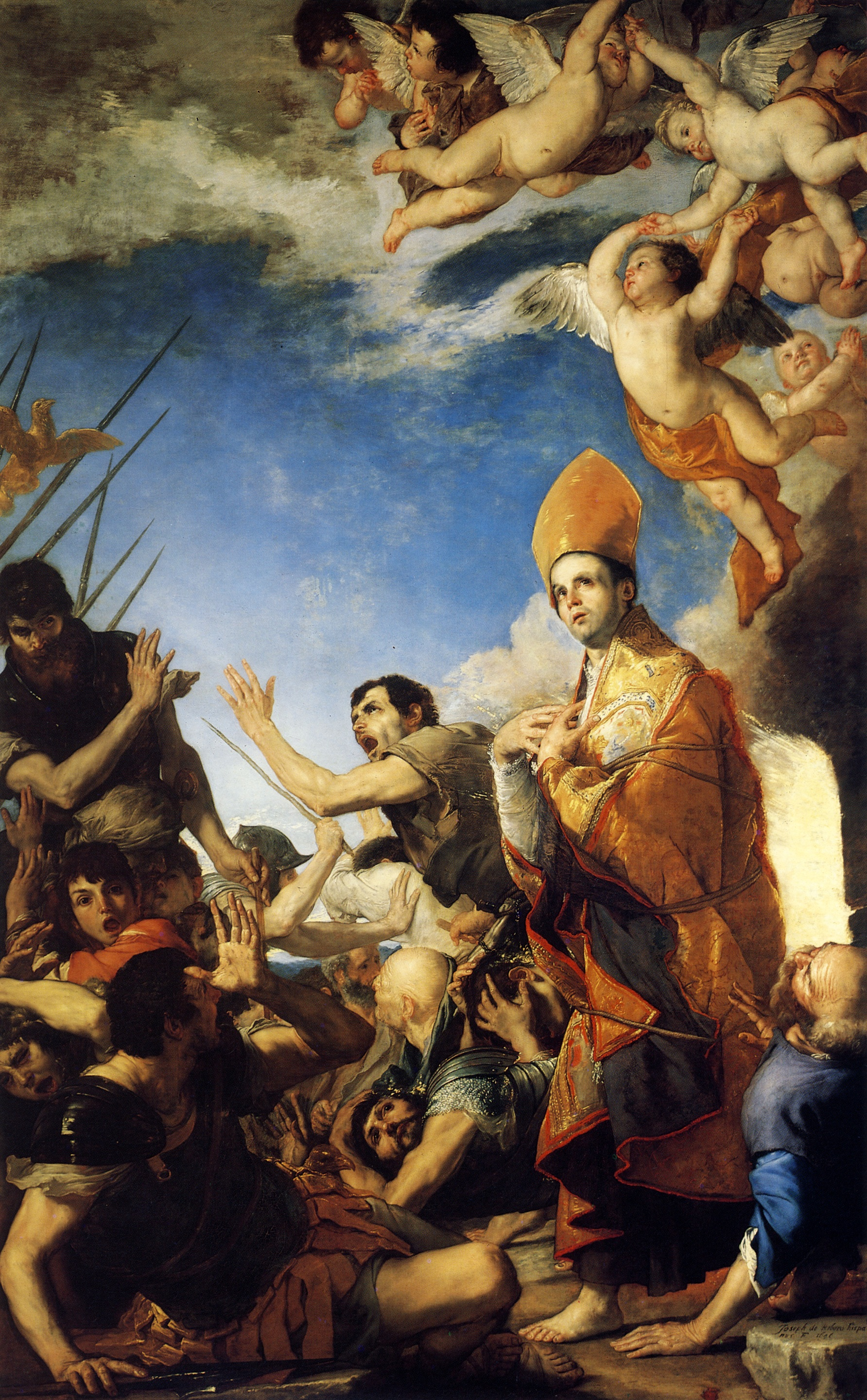
Saint Januarius Emerges Unscathed from the Furnace (1646) by Jusepe de Ribera

Saint Januarius Emerges Unscathed from the Furnace is an oil on copper painting by Jusepe de Ribera, commissioned in 1643 and completed three years later, in 1646. It is now in the Royal Chapel of the Treasure of St. Januarius in Naples Cathedral. It shows a legend relating to Naples' patron saint Januarius, shown as a bishop.

== Sources ==
- C. Guerra in M. Gualandi, Pitture della cappella del tesoro di San Gennaro, nella Cattedrale di Napoli, in "Memorie originali di Belle Arti", serie V, n. 178, 1844
