= Giuseppe Laguidara =

Italian sculptor

Giuseppe Laguidara (1697—1742) was an Italian sculptor of the Baroque period, active in his native Naples, Kingdom of Naples. He became a pupil of Lorenzo Vaccaro. He is described as sculpting figures of shepherds and shepherdesses for church nativity scenes (presepi). He was called to restore statues for the Neapolitan King, but due to an "exotic nature" he lost this employment. He died from an acute fever in 1742.

== Notes ==
- Boni, Filippo de' (1852). Biografia degli artisti ovvero dizionario della vita e delle opere dei pittori, degli scultori, degli intagliatori, dei tipografi e dei musici di ogni nazione che fiorirono da'tempi più remoti sino á nostri giorni. Seconda Edizione. Venice; Googlebooks: Presso Andrea Santini e Figlio. p. 526.
