= Giovan Domenico Vinaccia =

Italian sculptor

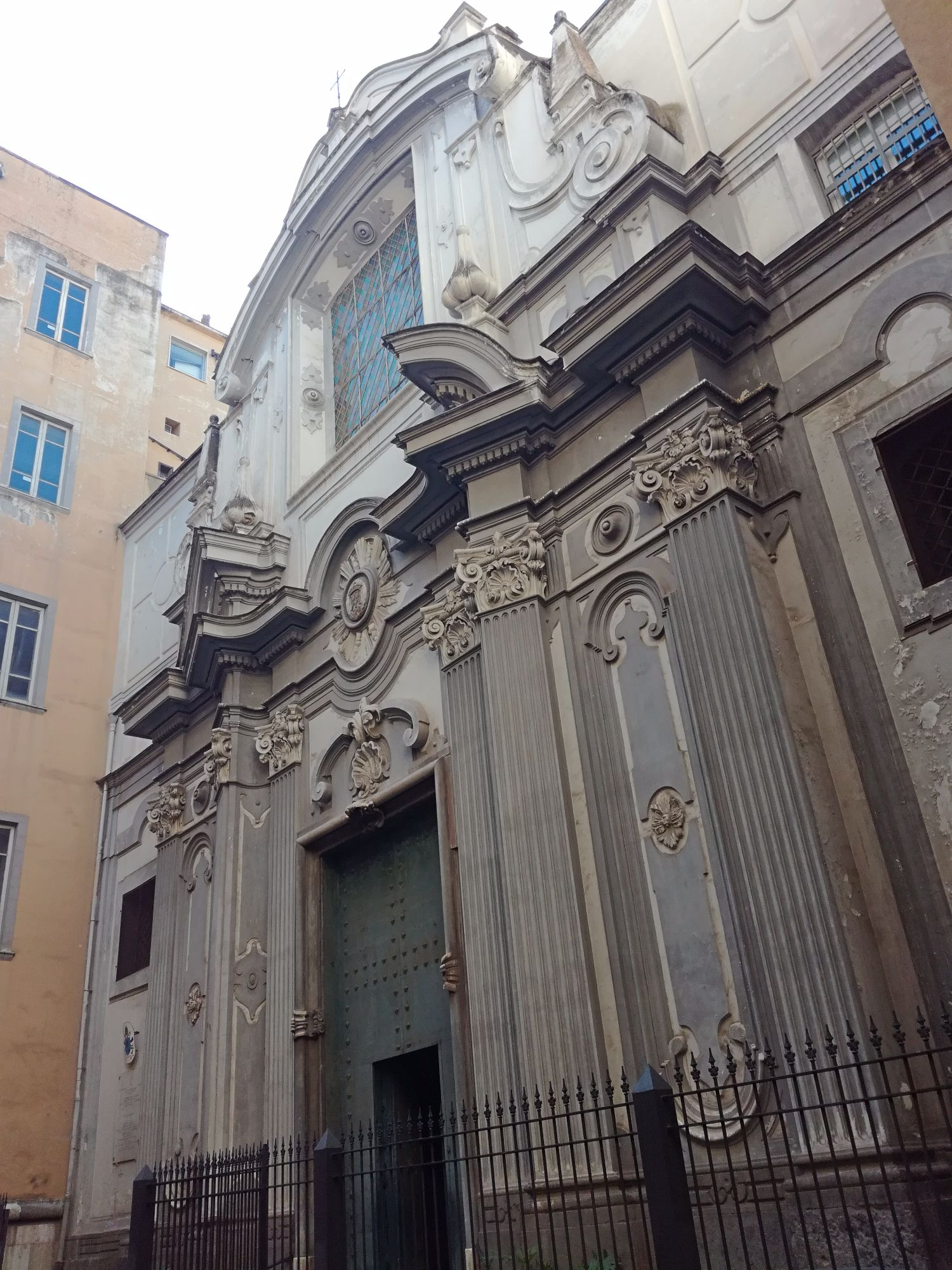
Facade of Gesù Vecchio

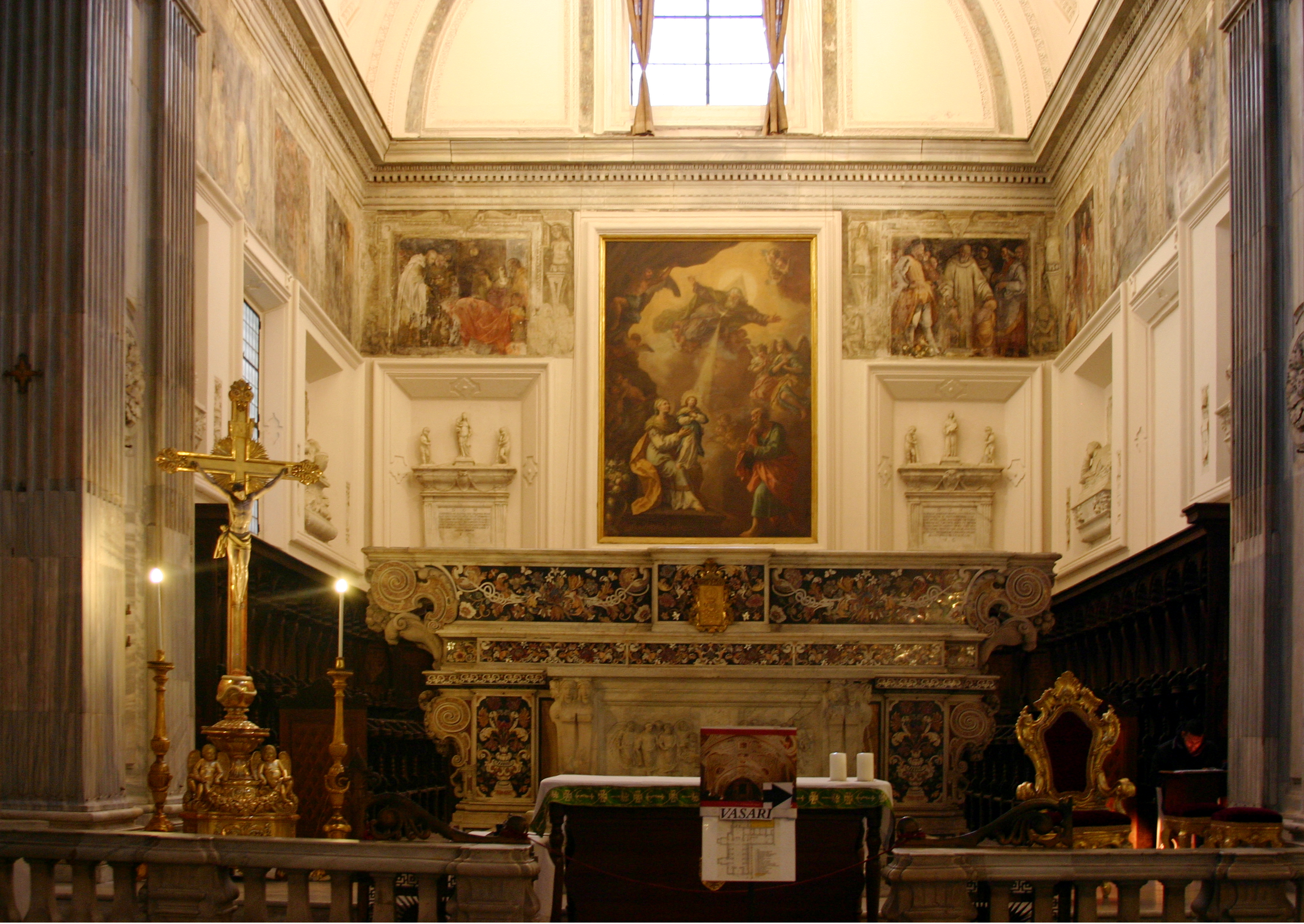
Altar at Monteoliveto

Giovan (Gian) Domenico Vinaccia (13 March 1625, Massa Lubrense - July 1695, Naples) was an Italian architect, goldsmith, engineer and sculptor.

== Life ==
He learned sculpture and architecture from Dionisio Lazzari. His first surviving independent work was the 1661 choir stalls in San Pietro ad Aram. Three years later he produced the high altar for the Royal Chapel of the Treasure of St. Januarius in Naples Cathedral, showing archbishop Alessandro Carafa who had brought St Januarius' relics to Naples. He also produced reliquaries for the Chiesa del Gesù Nuovo and designed another high altarpiece in Sant'Anna dei Lombardi, although the latter was actually carved by the Ghetti brothers. The architectural-sculptural scheme in Santa Maria dei Miracoli was also carved by him.

He also designed the facade of the Chiesa del Gesù Vecchio, the pavement and interior of Santa Maria Donnaregina Nuova, the altar in San Giuseppe dei Ruffi and the marbles in Sant’Andrea delle Dame. He collaborated with Lorenzo Vaccaro on several other works.
