= Capua Cathedral =

Roman Catholic cathedral in Campania, Italy

Coordinates: 41.1091°N 14.2110°E

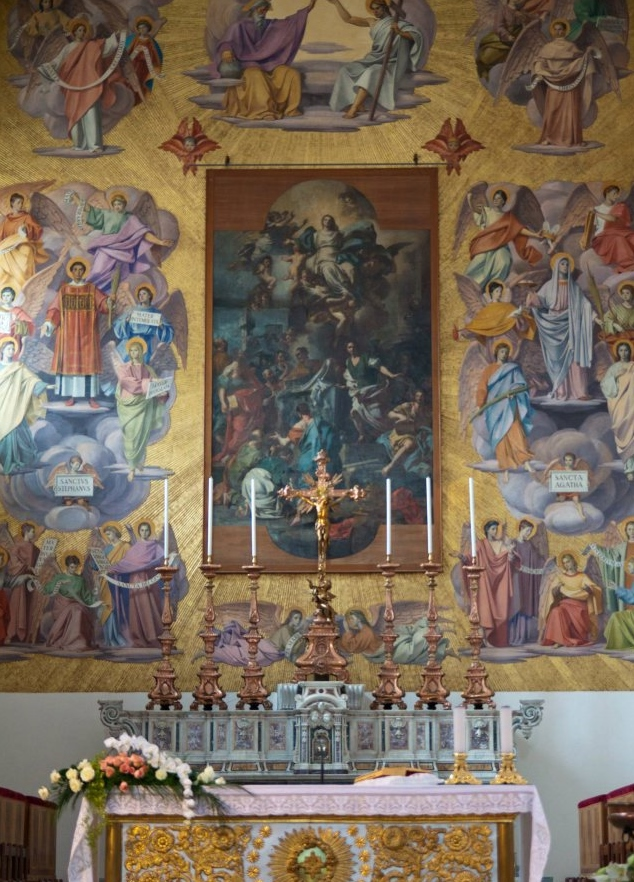
Presbytery

Capua Cathedral (Italian: Basilica cattedrale di Maria SS. Assunta in Coelo; Duomo di Capua) is a Roman Catholic cathedral in the city of Capua, Campania, Italy, dedicated to the Assumption of the Virgin Mary. It is the episcopal seat of the Archbishops of Capua. It was given the status of a basilica minor in 1827.

== History ==
The construction of the first church on the site is traditionally attributed to Landulfo, Bishop of Capua, in 856, using spolia columns from the local amphitheatre or other churches, but it was rebuilt in the 10th century and again, under Archbishop Erveo, towards the end of the 11th century, with subsequent major works.

The bell-tower has Lombard and Norman influences.

The entire church was destroyed by bombardment on 9 September 1943. It was rebuilt between 1949 and 1957. The Diocesan Museum was installed in a chapel here in 1992.

== Works of art ==
Among the paintings in the church are works by Domenico Vaccaro. Some of the frescoes recall past works including the frescoes in the presbytery depicting Eucharistic scenes (1961). The main altarpiece is of the Assumption of the Virgin by Francesco Solimena. In the nave are the columns by Archbishop Erveo (1073-1088) and a font from archbishop Cesare Costa (1572-1602). The crypt has a painting depicting a Dead Christ by Matteo Bottiglieri, an Addolorata by the school of Canova, and a Roman sarcophagus.
