= Royal Chapel of the Treasure of St. Januarius =

Chapel in Naples, Italy

Coordinates: 40.8524°N 14.2597°E

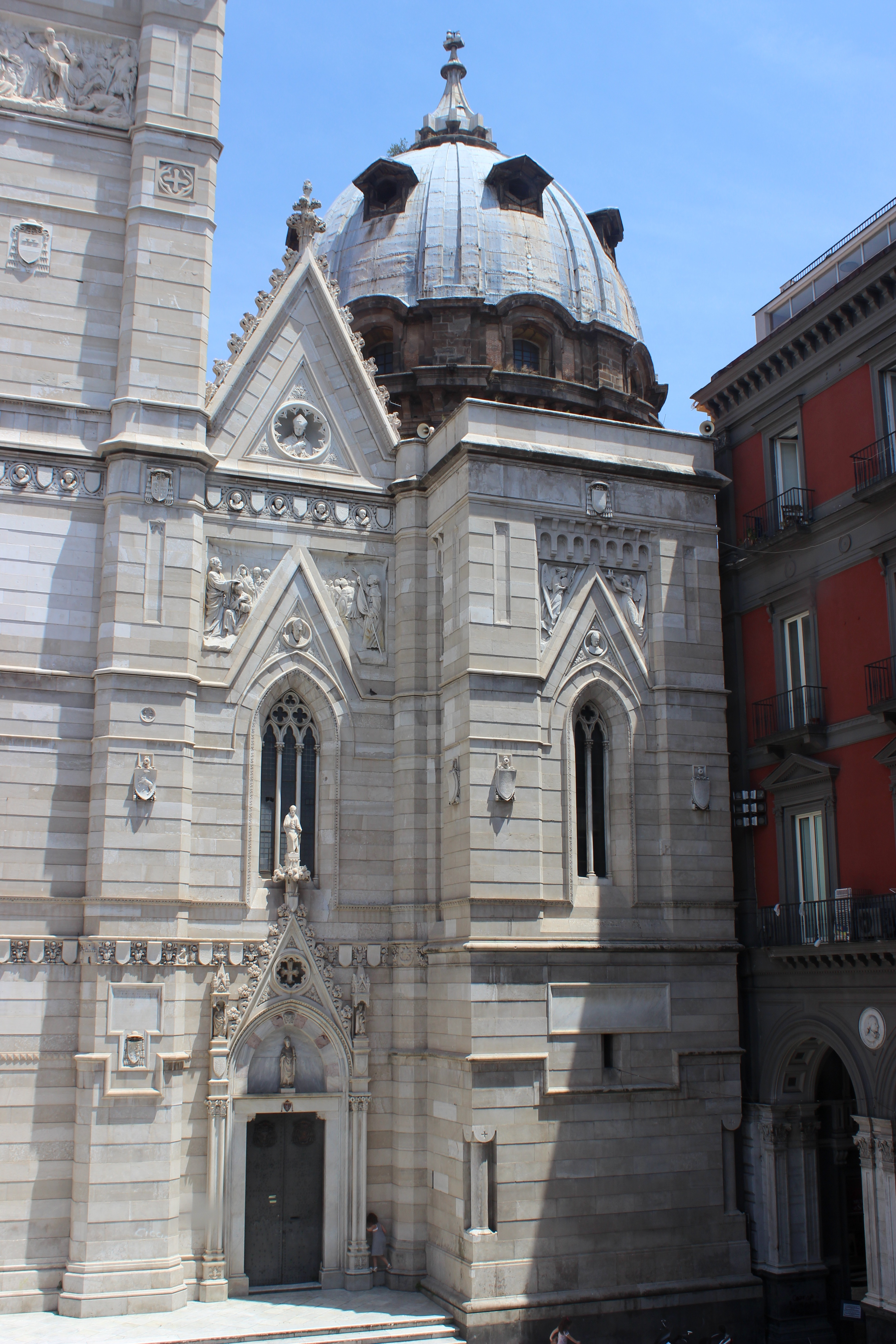
Dome of the Treasury Chapel seen from Piazza Riario Sforza

The Royal Chapel of the Treasure of St. Januarius, or the Reale cappella del Tesoro di San Gennaro, is a chapel located in Naples Cathedral, Italy, and dedicated to St. Januarius, patron saint of the city. This is the most lavishly decorated chapel in the cathedral, and contains contributions by the premier Baroque artists in Naples.

== History ==
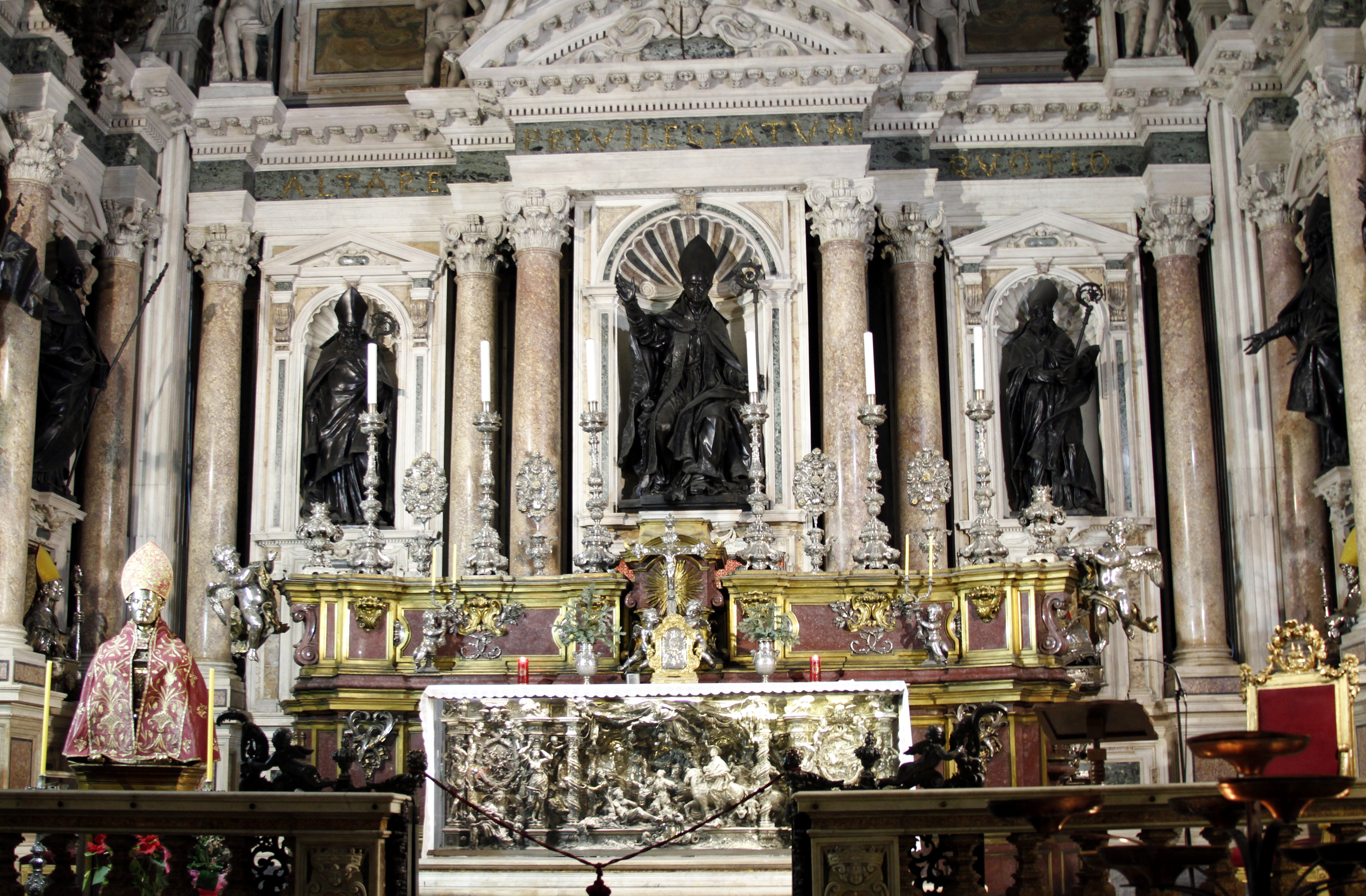
View of interior towards the altar

In the years 1526 to 1527, Naples endured a siege by the French, a resurgence of the plague, and a volcanic eruption by Vesuvius with its accompanying earthquakes. The surviving Neapolitans pledged to erect a chapel to their patron saint, St. Januarius. In 1527, the population of the elected city in a notarized document pledged a thousand ducats for the tabernacle, and 10,000 ducats to build the new chapel. On February 5, 1601, the "elect of the city" appointed a committee of twelve lay members, called on the "Deputation" to build of the new chapel. Work began in 1608, ended in 1646. The cost exceeded 480,000 scudi. Work was temporarily delayed because the cardinal Archbishop Francesco Boncompagni strongly opposed the exemption of the Deputation from the jurisdiction of the diocesan order, even though the church did not fund its construction; however in 1605, the Deputation, in fact, won the papal bull by Pope Paul V to begin on the construction of the sacred place. Centuries later, after the Naples joined the Kingdom of Italy, the chapel was exempted from lists of those religious structures confiscated by the state. Thanks to various papal bulls, the real Treasury Chapel of San Gennaro does not belong to the diocesan curia, but to the city of Naples, and represented by an ancient institution, which still exists today, the "Deputation", elected from diverse zones of Naples.

During the 17th and 18th centuries, the chapel was also used for musical activities, with the presence of masters such as Cimarosa, Paisiello, Francesco Provenzale Francesco Durante, Scarlatti and Charles Broschi.

== Painted decoration ==
The selection and deployment of the pictorial decoration was a saga that involved many of the premier painters of early 17th century Rome and Naples. The Deputation in charge of construction and decoration of the chapel, initially entrusted the pictorial decoration of the chapel to Giuseppe Cesari, also called Cavalier d'Arpino. The painter was popular in Rome under Pope Clement VIII Aldobrandini and remained so under Pope Paul V Borghese . A request was forwarded in 1616, and a contract was signed on March 7, 1618 But Cesari was slow to move to Naples, and the Deputation in 1620, revoked his contract and instead offered the position to Guido Reni. Reni, after much haggling about payments, refused the assignment, and finally the commission was offered to painter Fabrizio Santafede, who collaborated with Battistello Caracciolo and the Bolognese pupil of Reni, Francesco Gessi, to propose a design. The Deputation, however, was not satisfied with the plan. Soon after, Santafede died, and the team of Caracciolo and Gessi were fired.

On December 2, 1628, they sent out requests for a new proposals, this time also including local Neapolitan painters. None of the submissions were satisfactory. In 1630, the deputation commissioned a sample painting from the painter Domenico Zampieri (Domenichino), who like Reni, had been a pupil of Carracci in Rome. They asked him to submit a painting depicting the Martyrdom of San Gennaro (now in the museo del tesoro di San Gennaro). Pleased with the submission, he was hired in 1631.

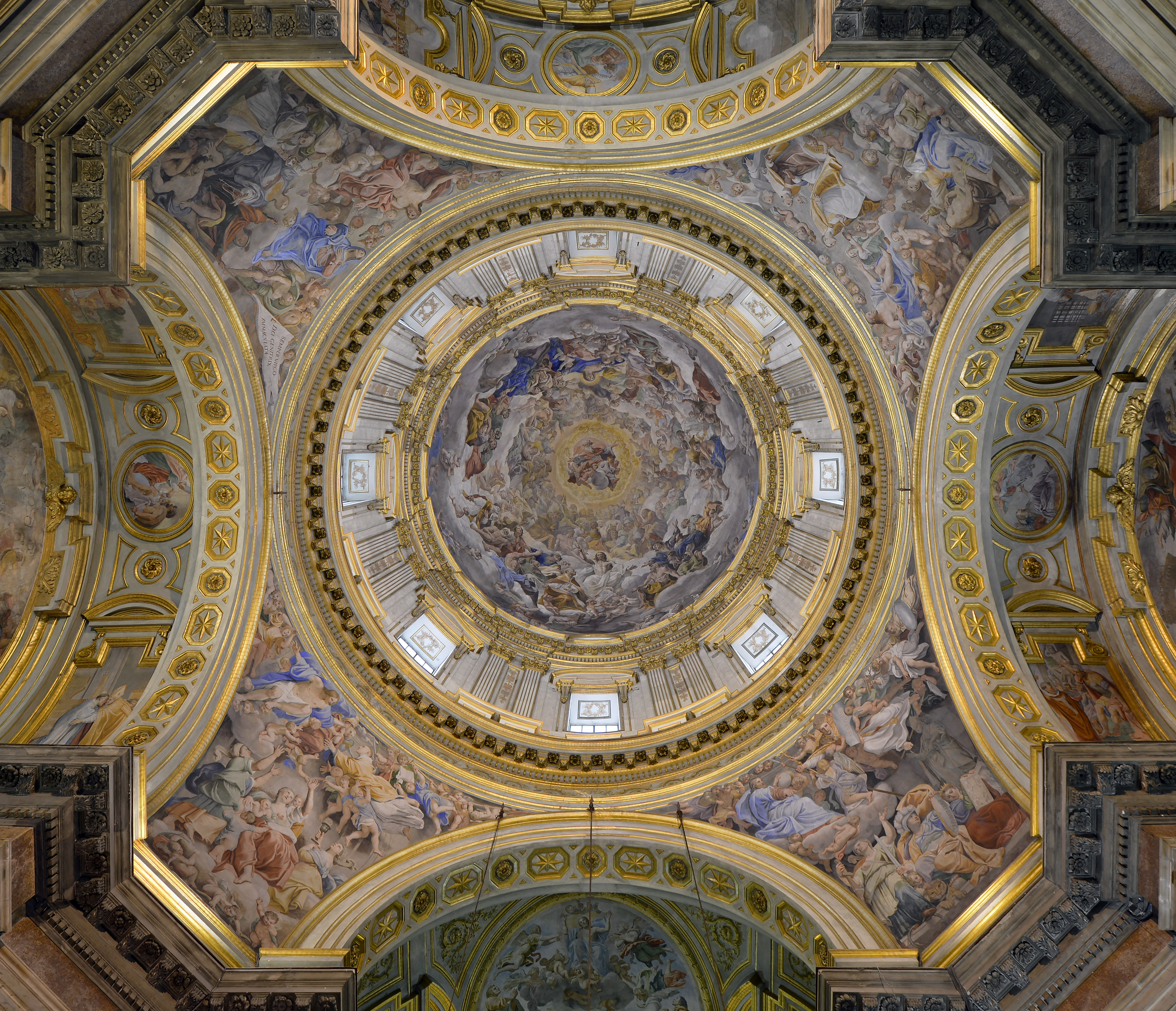
Frescoes of the Dome by Domenichino

Domenichino completed the majority of the frescoes in the chapel. He painted the four pinnacles: Pledge made by the Neapolitans in 1527,Meeting of Saint Gennaro with Christ in the Heavenly Glory, Virgin intercedes for Naples and Patronage of Saints Gennaro, Agrippina and Agnello Abate. He also painted the story of the life of San Gennaro in the three lunettes (1633) and in the arches. The four large altarpieces painted with oil on copper by Domenichino represent: the Beheading of Saint Januarius, the Miracle of the infirm healed by the oil lamp, the Infirm at the tomb of the Saint and Resurrection of a dead man. Domenichino died suddenly on April 6, 1641. A few months later, he was replaced by another follower of Carracci who was then in Rome, the Emilian, Giovanni Lanfranco. However, the Deputation on June 6, 1646, decided to ask the local painter Massimo Stanzione, to complete the altarapiece of Miracle of the Obsessed, left incomplete by Domenichino. Ultimately, Stanzione's submission was not acceptable, and they entrusted the work to Jusepe de Ribera, who painted San Gennaro emerges unscathed from the furnace of Cimitile.

== Architectural and sculptural contributions ==
The design of the chapel was entrusted to the Theatine priest and architect Francesco Grimaldi, who had been active in designing other churches including the church of Santa Maria della Sapienza, the Basilica of San Paolo Maggiore, and the church of Sant'Andrea delle Dame.To complete the chapel of San Gennaro, several buildings were demolished, including some houses, some chapels, and the small church of Sant'Andrea. The chapel has a Greek cross plan with a dome.

In the interior, Francesco Solimena created the porphyry altar (1667) that frames the silver front (1692–1695) by Giovan Domenico Vinaccia. Behind the altar, two niches with silver doors donated by Charles II of Spain in 1667 guard the vials of the blood of San Gennaro. The reliquary bust of Saint Gennaro in gold and silver was made by three Provençal goldsmiths, and donated by Charles II in 1305. The largest bronze sculptures, including a St Peter and Paul flanking the entrance, were made by Giuliano Finelli, a student of Bernini. The chapel's marble decoration began in 1610 under plans of Grimaldi, and was completed under the direction of Christopher Monterosso. The brass gates of the chapel were designed by Cosimo Fanzago in 1630 replacing the one built by Giovanni Giacomo Conforto in 1628.

There are also fifty-four reliquary busts, all in all silver. The frescoes are by Domenichino, Lanfranco and Ribera.

== See also ==
- Museo del Tesoro di San Gennaro
- Churches in Naples
- 17th-century Western domes
