= Lorenzo Vaccaro =

Italian sculptor

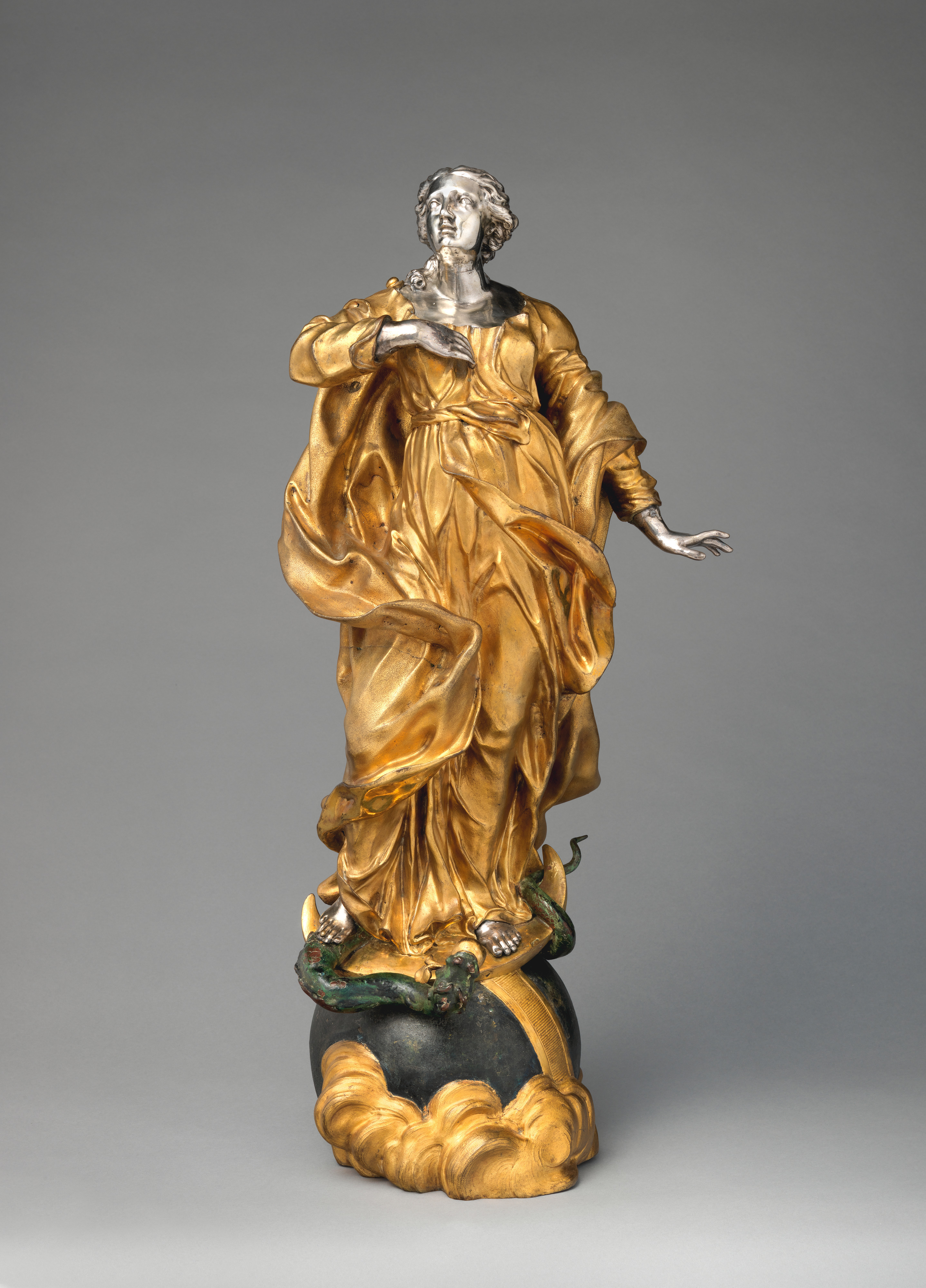
- Virgin of the Immaculate Conception, Metropolitan Museum of Art, New York
- Born: 1655; Naples, Kingdom of Naples
- Died: 10 August 1706 (aged 50–51); Torre del Greco, Kingdom of Naples
- Education: Cosimo Fanzago; Dionisio Lazzari
- Known for: Sculpture
- Movement: Baroque

Lorenzo Vaccaro (1655 – 10 August 1706) was an Italian late-Baroque sculptor. He worked in a formalized restrained style.

== Biography ==
Lorenzo Vaccaro was born in Naples, the son of a lawyer. He apprenticed with Cosimo Fanzago and Dionisio Lazzari. He was deeply influenced by the work of Fanzago and by contemporary Roman sculpture. In 1689 he won the commission for the large silver altarpiece in the Cappella delle Grazie in Santa Maria la Nova, Naples, decorated with scenes of the Nativity, Assumption and Presentation of Mary, divided by caryatids. It was executed by the silversmith Matteo Treglia (fl. 1685–1714), but Bernardo de' Dominici indicates that Vaccaro himself worked in silver.

The success of this project led to commissions for other works in silver, among them allegories of the four continents (1692; Toledo Cathedral). In both these works the dominant influence is no longer Fanzago or Roman sculpture but the painter Francesco Solimena. The influence was mutual; de' Dominici described them as ‘the Solimena of sculpture’ and ‘the Vaccaro of painting’, but Solimena was the dominant figure, and Vaccaro’s increasing response to him can be seen in the eloquent gestures, complex compositions and rich use of drapery of his work in the 1690s.

Vaccaro is known to have executed some paintings himself, such as the four recorded in 1690 for the Duca di Morciano, but none has so far been identified. Until his death Vaccaro continued to work on architectural and decorative schemes, such as the decoration of chapels in the church of the Certosa di San Martino, as well as on monuments, such as the equestrian statue of Philip V of Spain ( 1702–5), for which two bronze modelli survive in the Museo del Prado, Spain.

Vaccaro was murdered at Torre del Greco in August 1706. His son Domenico Antonio Vaccaro inherited his father’s workshop, but Lorenzo Vaccaro was also responsible for training a new generation of sculptors, including Matteo Bottiglieri and Giuseppe Laguidara.

== Sources ==
- Ciechanowiecki, Andrew (1979). "A Bozzetto by Lorenzo Vaccaro". The Burlington Magazine. 121 (913): 250–253. JSTOR 879562.
- Boucher, Bruce (1998). Italian Baroque Sculpture. World of Art. London: Thames & Hudson. p. 80.
