= Matteo Bottiglieri =

Italian sculptor and painter

Matteo Bottiglieri (1684–1757) was an Italian sculptor and painter from Naples.

One of his first works is a marble "Dead Christ" (1724), in the crypt of the Capua Cathedral, perhaps executed after drawings by Francesco Solimena. In 1733 he executed three works for the Church of the Crucifix in Salerno, and in the same year he took part in the decoration of San Giuseppe dei Ruffi in Naples.

In 1747-1750, together with Francesco Pagani, he worked at the Spire of Guglia of the Immaculate Conception in the Gesù Nuovo square. He also executed numerous drawings portraying shepherds, later used as models for figures in Nativity scenes. Some are in the collection of the Caserta Palace. Also attributed to him is a group of "Christ and the Samaritan" in the cloister of San Gregorio Armeno, as well as the sepulchre of Alessandro Vicentini in the right transept of the church of San Domenico Maggiore.

== Sources ==
- Mancini, Franco (1993). I pastori napoletani del Settecento. Naples: Franco Di Mauro Editore.
