= Sant'Andrea delle Dame, Naples =

Former Augistinian complex in Naples, Italy

Coordinates: 40.8530°N 14.2525°E

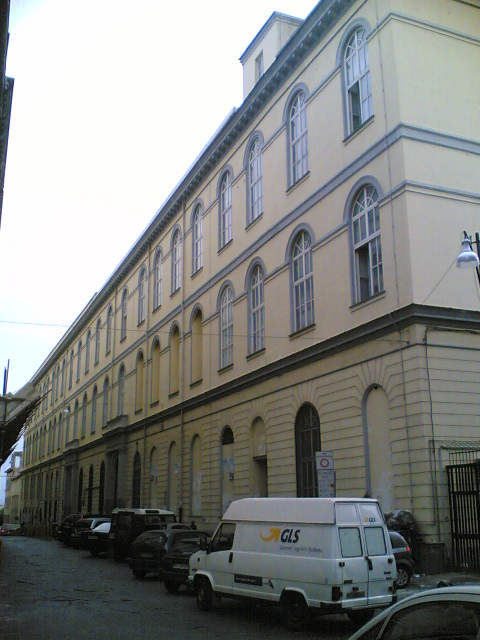
Exterior

Sant'Andrea delle Dame was an Augustinian monastery church dedicated to Saint Andrew with associated cloister and monastic buildings in Naples. The monastic buildings later became one of the buildings of the Università degli studi di Napoli and - after the establishment of the medicine faculty of the Università degli Studi della Campania Luigi Vanvitelli - now house that faculty's Naples headquarters.

It was founded by four daughters of the notary Andrea Palescandolo in 1580 and designed either by their Theatine brother Marco Palescandolo or by Francesco Grimaldi. It opened on 7 March 1587, with the cloister completed early in the 17th century and a belvedere-style cloister known as the "Torretta reale" added in 1748. It was suppressed under the French occupation and the monastic church was deconsecrated in 1884. It was damaged by bombing and bombardment during the Second World War, but its original features survived. The church was restored in 2004.
