= Santa Maria dei Miracoli =

Santa Maria dei Miracoli may refer to the following churches in Italy:

- Santa Maria dei Miracoli, Brescia
- Santa Maria dei Miracoli, Naples
- Santa Maria dei Miracoli, Ragusa
- Santa Maria dei Miracoli, Rome
- Santa Maria dei Miracoli, Syracuse
- Santa Maria dei Miracoli, Venice
- Santa Maria dei Miracoli presso San Celso, Milan
