= Vico Miracoli =

Street in Naples, Italy

- Interactive map of Vico Miracoli
- Location: Naples, Italy
- Quarter: San Carlo all'Arena
- Postal code: 80137
- From: Salita Montagnola
- To: Vicoletto della Pacella ai Miracoli

Vico Miracoli is a street in Naples, Italy, in the San Carlo all'Arena quarter. It forms part of the dense network of alleys and steep lanes radiating from Piazza dei Miracoli, in front of the church of Santa Maria dei Miracoli from which the whole area takes its name, in a hilly district between the Botanical Garden of the University of Naples Federico II and the Astronomical Observatory of Capodimonte.

== History ==
The Miracoli area was already built up by the sixteenth century, and in the early seventeenth century the street network developed around the square in front of the church of Santa Maria dei Miracoli. In the 1629 view by Alessandro Baratta the square already appears as a four-way junction, the focal point of a street layout that has remained almost unchanged to the present day: from it radiated Salita Miradois, leading towards the Astronomical Observatory, a lane cut into the tuff of the Montagnola hill, Via dei Miracoli, and the narrower Vico Nunziatella ai Miracoli and Vicoletto de' Miracoli.

The internal layout of the area is documented with particular clarity in a plan drawn by Giovanni Papa in 1724, now preserved in the archive of the church of the Missione ai Vergini, which shows it as one of the routes leading into the interior of the city.

During the twentieth century, particularly with the addition of extra storeys to buildings in the 1970s, the appearance of the area changed from its eighteenth-century state, although traces survive of the terraced and hanging gardens that once characterised it. One of these, between Vico Castrucci and Vico dei Miracoli, provided the ground and the foundation for the small church of Santa Maria dei Miracoli. In the same area stands Palazzo Tortora, the oldest building in the district, dating from the late 1580s.

== Description ==
Vico Miracoli links Salita Montagnola to Vicoletto della Pacella ai Miracoli, in an area of narrow, steep lanes typical of the hilly quarters of the Naples historic centre. The street remains part of the route affected each year, in mid-July, by the traffic measures imposed by the City of Naples for the feast of the patron saint, Santa Maria dei Miracoli, along with Via Miracoli, Piazza Miracoli, Salita Montagnola and Vico Santa Maria degli Angeli alle Croci.

== Churches and historic buildings ==
The church and convent of Santa Maria dei Miracoli, in Largo dei Miracoli, were founded in 1616 by the Reformed Conventual friars of San Lorenzo; in 1660 the complex passed under the jurisdiction of the Pio Monte della Misericordia. The present façade is a rebuilding of 1790 by Camillo Lionti, while the interior houses works by Andrea Malinconico, frescoes in the pronaos by Giovanni Battista Beinaschi, and canvases by Andrea Vaccaro and Luca Giordano.

A short distance away, on the same hill, stands the church of Santa Maria degli Angeli alle Croci, considered one of the finest Baroque churches in Naples. It was built in 1581 together with the convent of the Observant Franciscans and took its name from the Via Crucis once held along the slope leading up to the church; between 1639 and 1647 it was remodelled by Cosimo Fanzago, working on the commission of Friar Giovanni da Napoli. The former convent today houses the Faculty of Veterinary Medicine of the University of Naples Federico II.

Among the civil buildings, mention should be made of the already noted Palazzo Tortora, the oldest in the area, and a nearby palazzo whose courtyard retains access to an underground cavity, evidence of the ancient quarrying of the tuff on which the whole district stands.

== See also ==
- Santa Maria dei Miracoli, Naples
- Santa Maria degli Angeli alle Croci
- Rione Sanità
