= Santa Maria della Sapienza =

Church building in Naples, Italy

Coordinates: 40.851053°N 14.252066°E

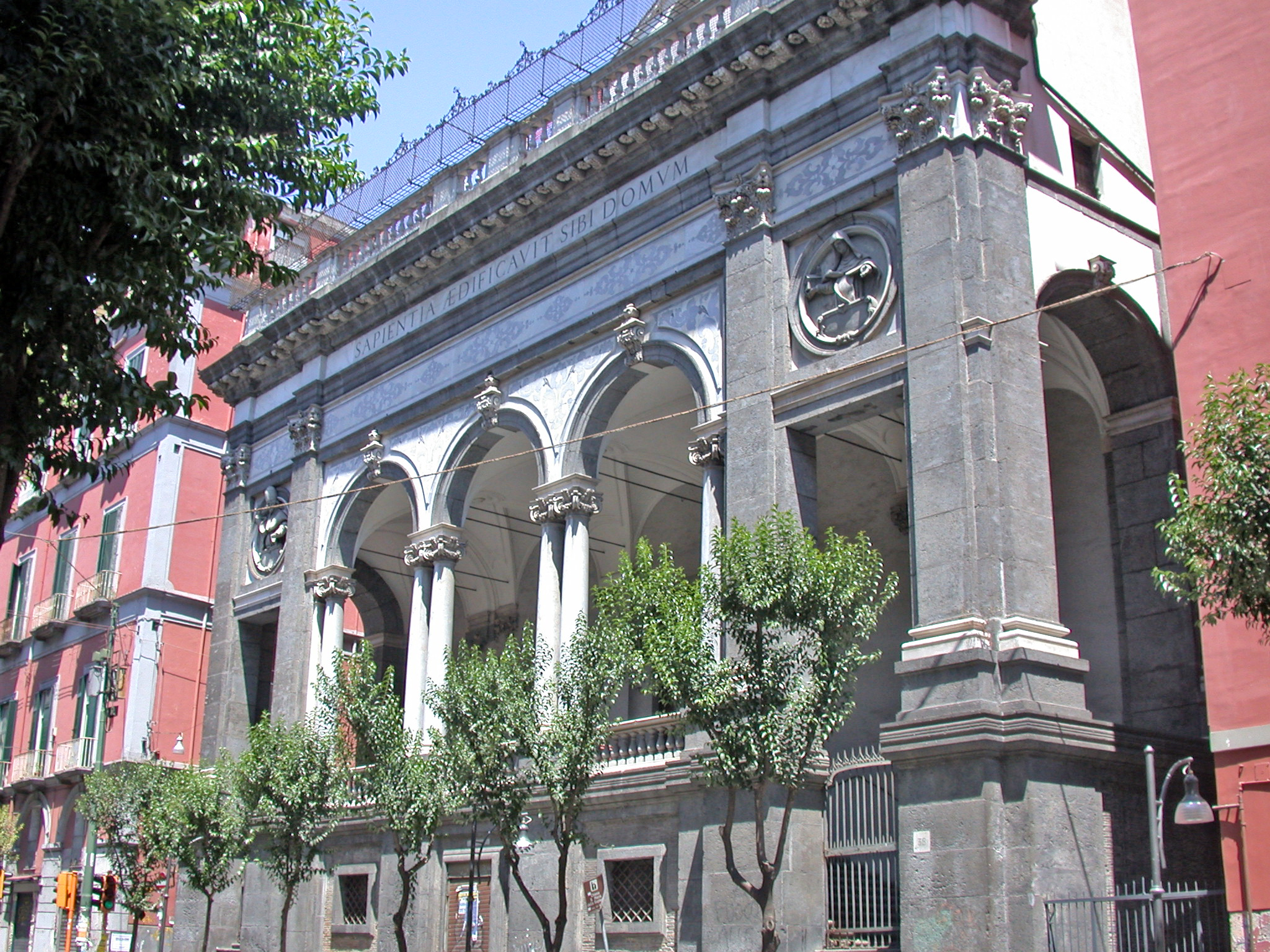

Religion
- Affiliation: Catholicism
- Region: Campania
- Rite: Roman
- Patron: Mary

Location
- Municipality: Naples
- Country: Italy

Architecture
- Groundbreaking: 1625

Santa Maria della Sapienza is a Roman Catholic church, located on Via Costantinopoli in central Naples, Italy.

== History ==
In 1507, the cardinal Oliviero Carafa, archbishop of Naples, began plans for construction at the site a University della Sapienza. Work only began posthumously on lots purchased from Giovanni Latro, and Giampietro and Marino Stendardo. The site was converted into a Clarissan monastery, but membership of this monastery languished by 1535, and the remaining nuns were moved by Cardinal and Archbishop Giampietro Carafa (later Pope Paul IV), change into a Dominican order, under the pope's sibling, Maria, as abbess. Her relics became venerated in the church, which also contained relics of Saints Evaristo and Prisciano (siblings of San Fortunato); and the liquefying blood of St Stephen Protomartyr. The two sculpted roundels in the façade depict busts of Pope Paul IV and his sister Maria.

The church was built in 1625 using designs by Francesco Grimaldi (a Theatine priest), and completed by 1630 by Giovan Giacomo Di Conforto. The architects Cosimo Fanzago and Dionisio Lazzari are said to have helped complete the façade and entrance stairs; Fanzago, in the design, Lazzari, in the marble decor. Other sources say the plans for the façade were by Di Conforto. From 1634 to 1636, the cupola and belltower were completed. Giacomo Lazzari designed the dome, whose interior ceiling was frescoed by Belisario Corenzio. The adjacent monastery was demolished in the 19th century, so that a hospital and clinic could be built.

The interior is decorated with polychrome marbles by Dionisio Lazzari. The black and white pavement decoration is similar to that in the church of San Gregorio Armeno. The apse frescoes are by Cesare Fracanzano, while two angels in the tympanum were sculpted by Paolo Benaglia. Within the church is a large chapel called the Cappella della Scala Santa (Chapel of the Holy Stair). The church della Sapienza has closed for decades. The church was undergoing restoration in 2011.

== Bibliography ==
- Vincenzo Regina, Le chiese di Napoli. Viaggio indimenticabile attraverso la storia artistica, architettonica, letteraria, civile e spirituale della Napoli sacra, Newton and Compton editor, Naples 2004.
