= Santa Teresa a Chiaia =

Church building in Naples, Italy

Church of Santa Teresa a Chiaia
- Chiesa di Santa Teresa a Chiaia
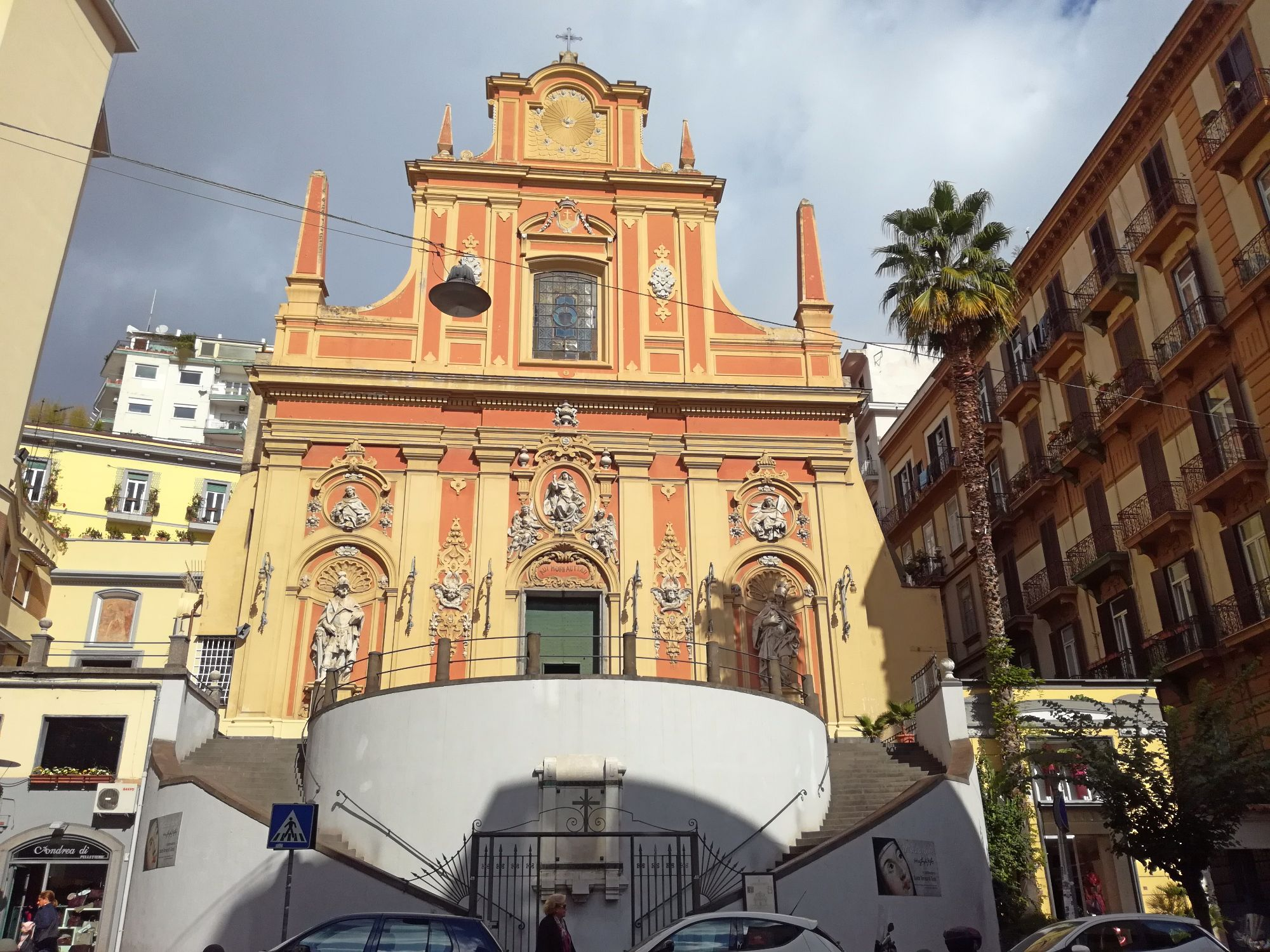
- The façade of church.
- Church of Santa Teresa a Chiaia
- 40.836950°N 14.235785°E
- Location: Naples; Province of Naples, Campania
- Country: Italy
- Denomination: Roman Catholic

History
- Status: Active

Architecture
- Groundbreaking: 1620

Administration
- Diocese: Roman Catholic Archdiocese of Naples

Santa Teresa a Chiaia is a Baroque church in Naples, Italy.

The church was founded in 1620, and completed in 1650-1662 by Cosimo Fanzago. The earthquake of 1688 damaged the church and required reconstruction. The church was originally called Santa Teresa Plaggie, due to the place near the beach where it was located. The facade is rich in stucco decoration. The interior is a Greek cross plan with a statue of St Teresa, by Fanzago on the main altar. The principal works in the church are the Infancy of Mary, Repose in Egypt, St Peter appears to St Teresa and St Peter of Alcantara providing confession to St Teresa, by Luca Giordano.

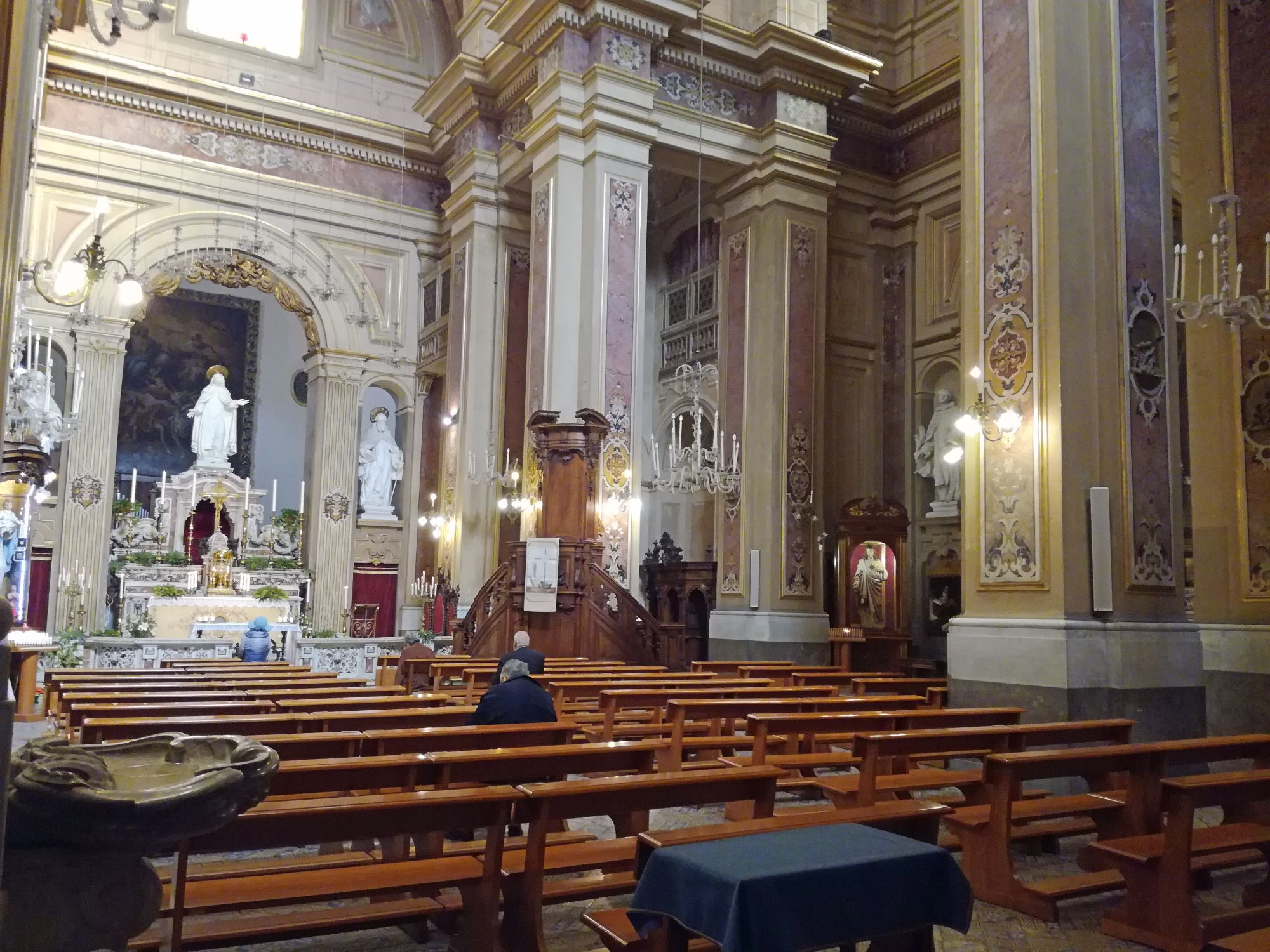
Interior

== Bibliography ==
- Napoli e dintorni, Touring club Italia, Touring Editor, 2001.
