= Villa Donn'Anna =

Coordinates: 40°49′12″N 14°12′51″E

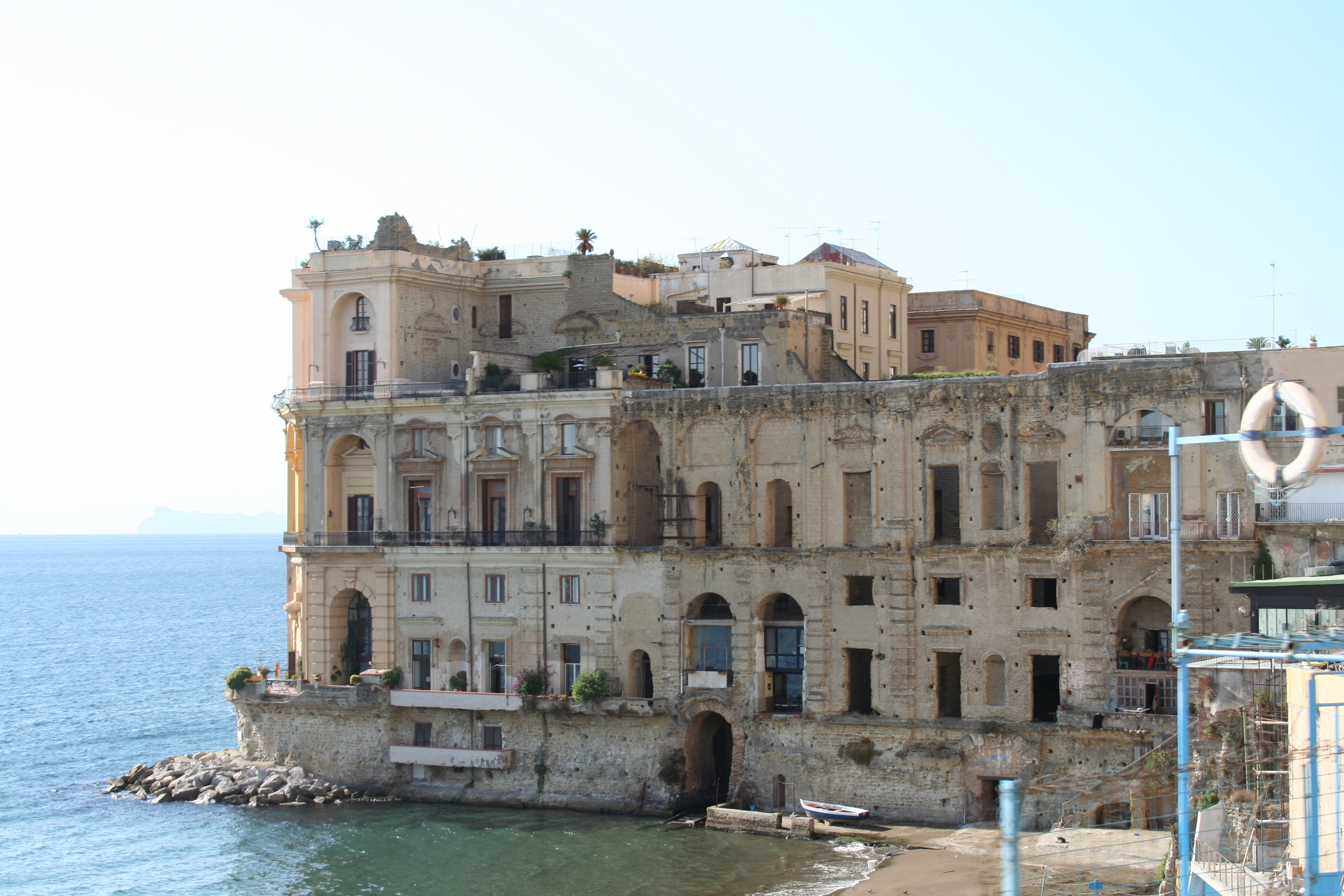
Palazzo Donn'Anna in Naples.

Palazzo Donn'Anna is a historic residence in Naples, Italy. It sits prominently at water's edge at the beginning of the Posillipo coast, just west of the Mergellina boat harbor. The building is on the site of the so-called "Rocks of the Siren" and, indeed, was originally called La Villa Sirena.

== History ==
The original building on the site was probably built by one Dragonetto Bonifacio in the early 15th century. It changed hands a number of times and finally was inherited in 1630 by the woman whose name it now bears, Anna Carafa, duchess of Stigliano and wife of Ramiro Núñez de Guzmán, the Spanish Viceroy of Naples. She had the building redone by architect Cosimo Fanzago in the 1640s. When her husband returned to Spain alone in 1644, the unfinished palace was left abandoned and neglected The palace was purchased from the heirs of Anna Carafa by Teora Mirelli. The grand but decaying baroque building projecting directly into the sea presented an irresistible subject for eighteenth- and nineteenth-century artists. In particular, thanks to the nearby villa of William Hamilton, many were the foreign and British travellers who remained fascinated. By the beginning of the 19th century, the structure was still markedly dilapidated. In the early 1900 a French family, Genevois, bought it and started transforming it as it appears to be today. The Western wing was sold in 1928 to the Colonna di Paliano family and later to many more families, being fractioned by the Genevois heirs in smaller units. Part of the building is still a ruin, but most of it is currently used as a residence, including the home gallery of art dealer Lia Rumma and for Napoli football player Dries Mertens.
