= Santa Maria dei Miracoli, Naples =

Church in Naples, Italy

Coordinates: 40.858830°N 14.256230°E

Santa Maria dei Miracoli is a basilica church located in the largo dei Miracoli, near Via Foria in the city center of Naples, Italy. The neighborhood is named that of Miracoli or Miracles.

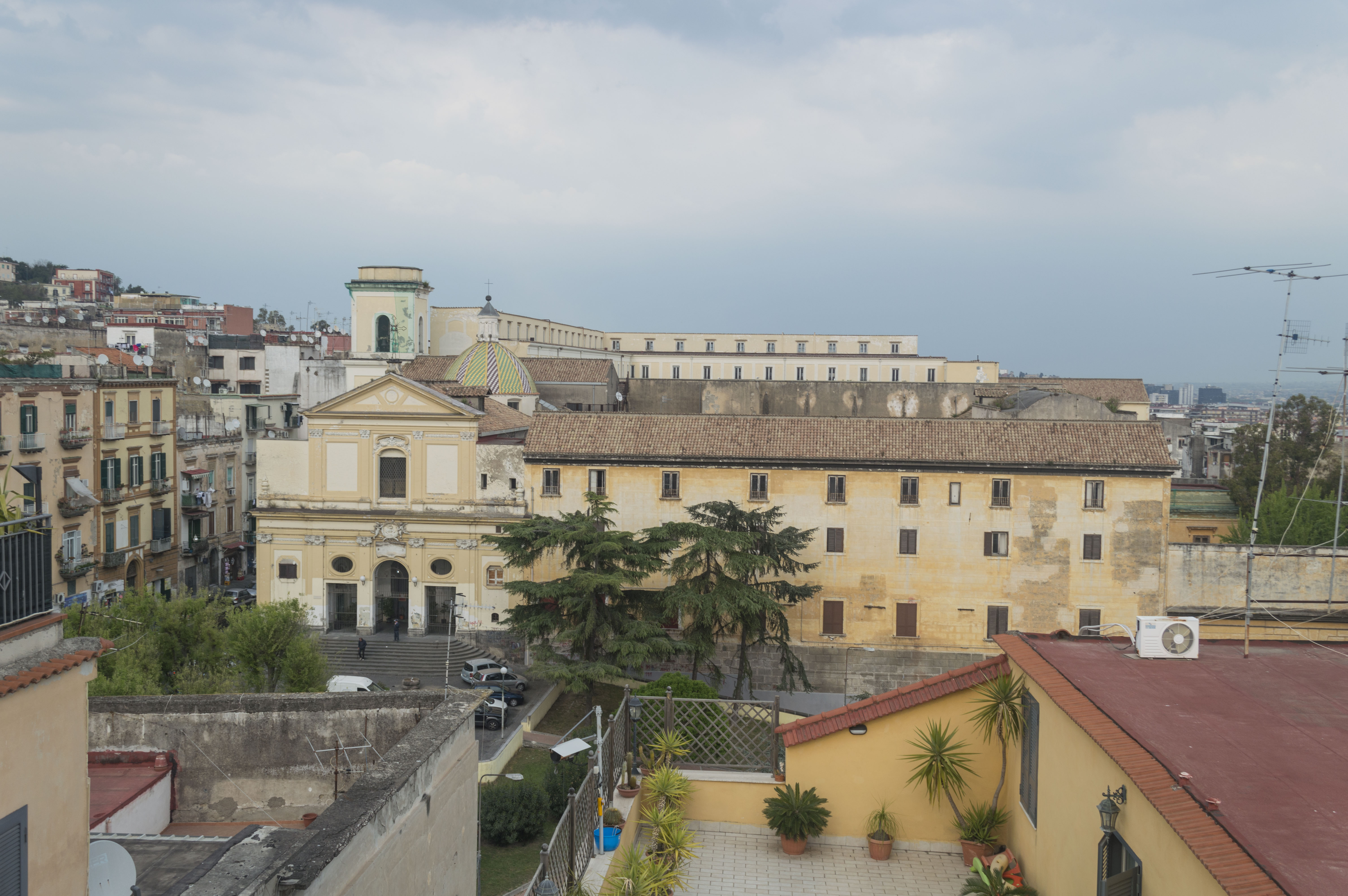
View to the church from the roof of near monastery

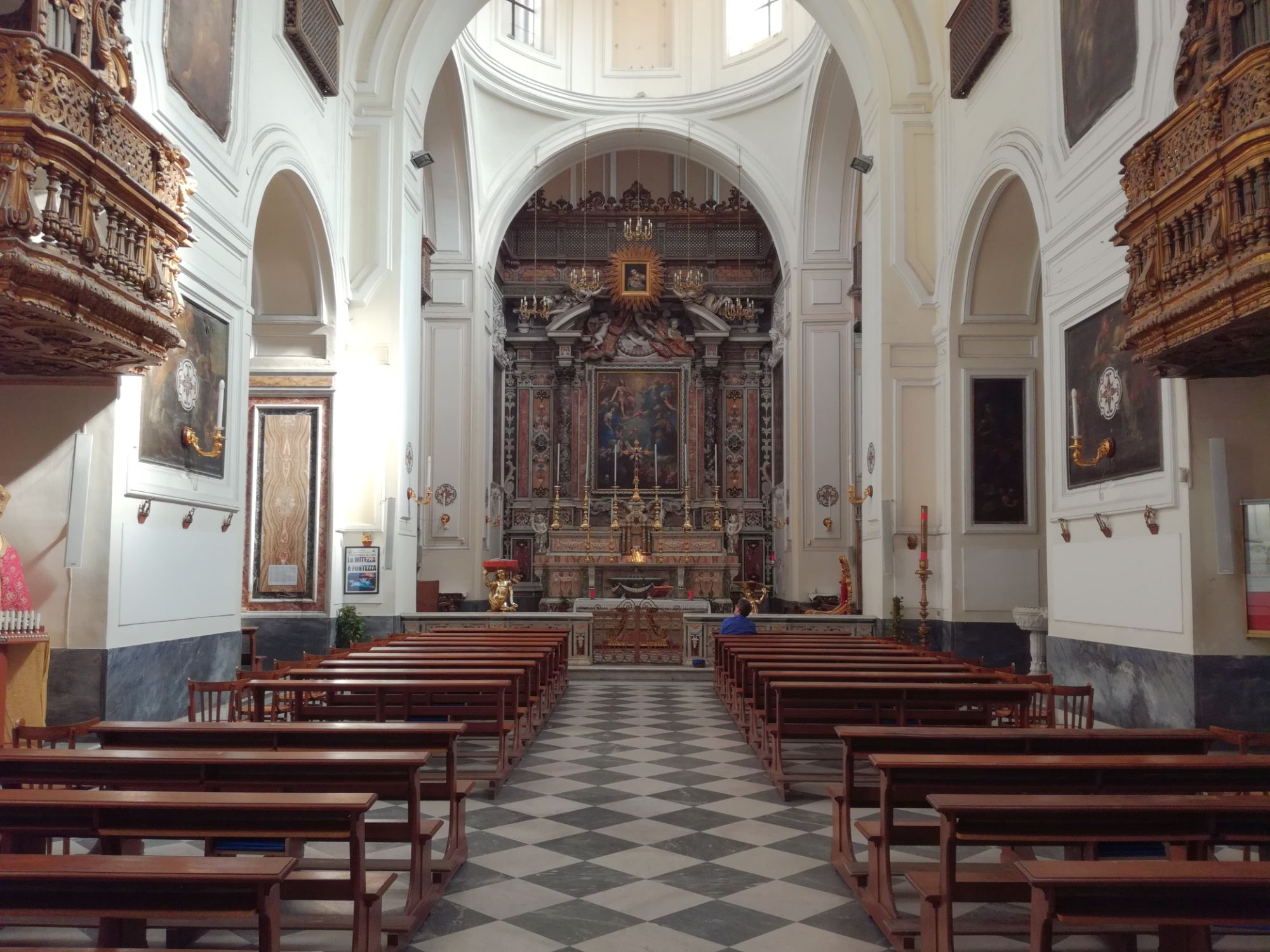
Interior.

== History ==
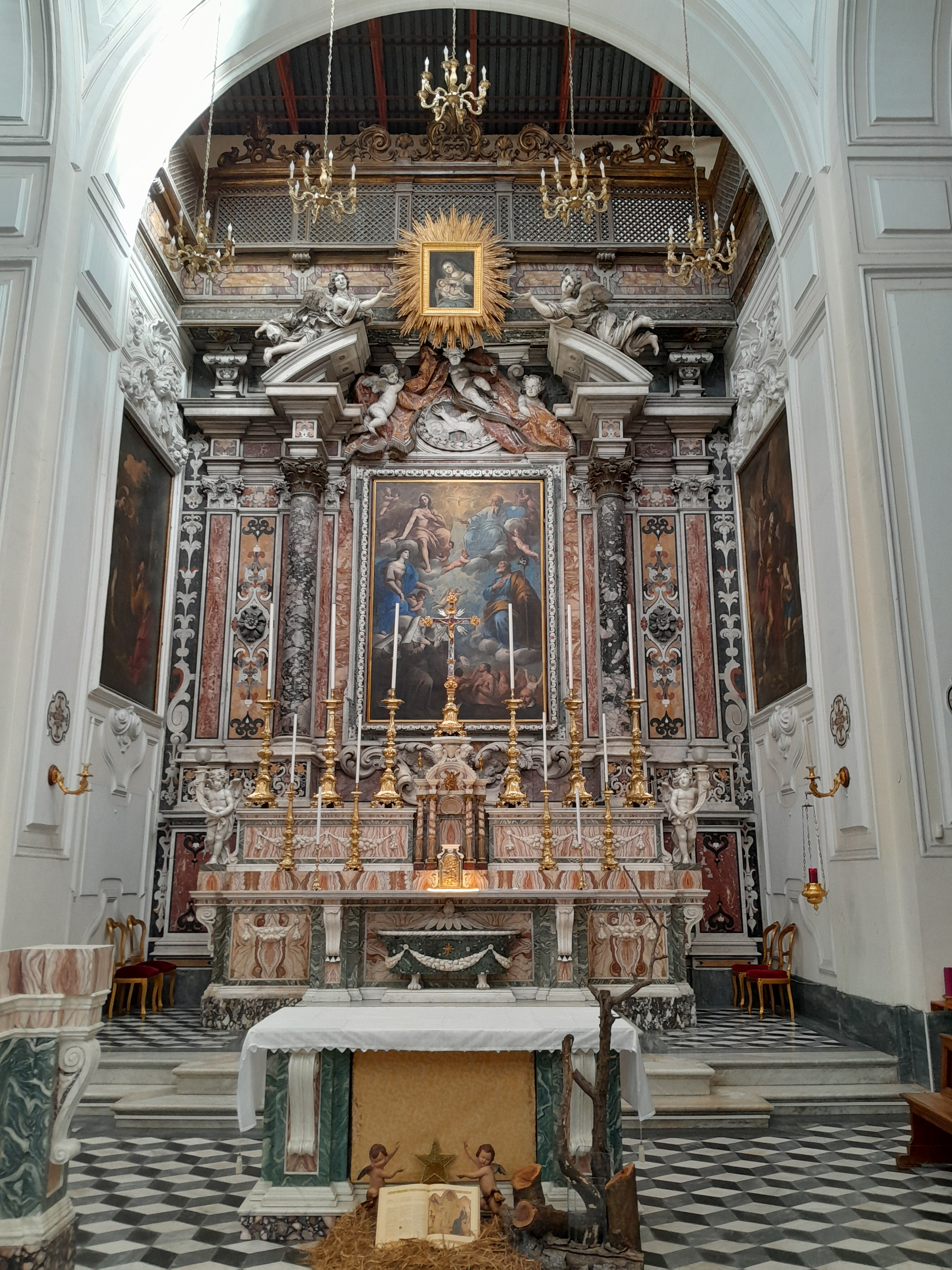
Interior

The construction of the church was started in the 17th century in a zone near the northern limits; in the same period a convent of the same name was built and assigned to the Reformed Conventuals of St Lawrence (padri Rifornati Conventuali di San Lorenzo). In 1660 the complex came under the jurisdiction of the aristocratic association of Pio Monte della Misericordia, and later of a nunnery allied with the Franciscan Order. A restoration led by Francesco Antonio Picchiatti, who availed himself of the collaboration of Cosimo Fanzago and Domenico Tango. The monastery, after the 19th-century Risorgimento, was named after Princess Maria Clotilde of Savoy, and became a school. The facade was reconstructed in 1790 by Camillo Leonti. The church has a Latin cross plan, with interior decoration by Giovanni Domenico Vinaccia. There are numerous paintings by Andrea Malinconico.

== Bibliography ==
- Vincenzo Regina, Le chiese di Napoli. Viaggio indimenticabile attraverso la storia artistica, architettonica, letteraria, civile e spirituale della Napoli sacra, Newton e Compton editor, Naples 2004.
