= Santa Maria Egiziaca a Pizzofalcone =

Church in Naples, Italy

Coordinates: 40.834126°N 14.246894°E

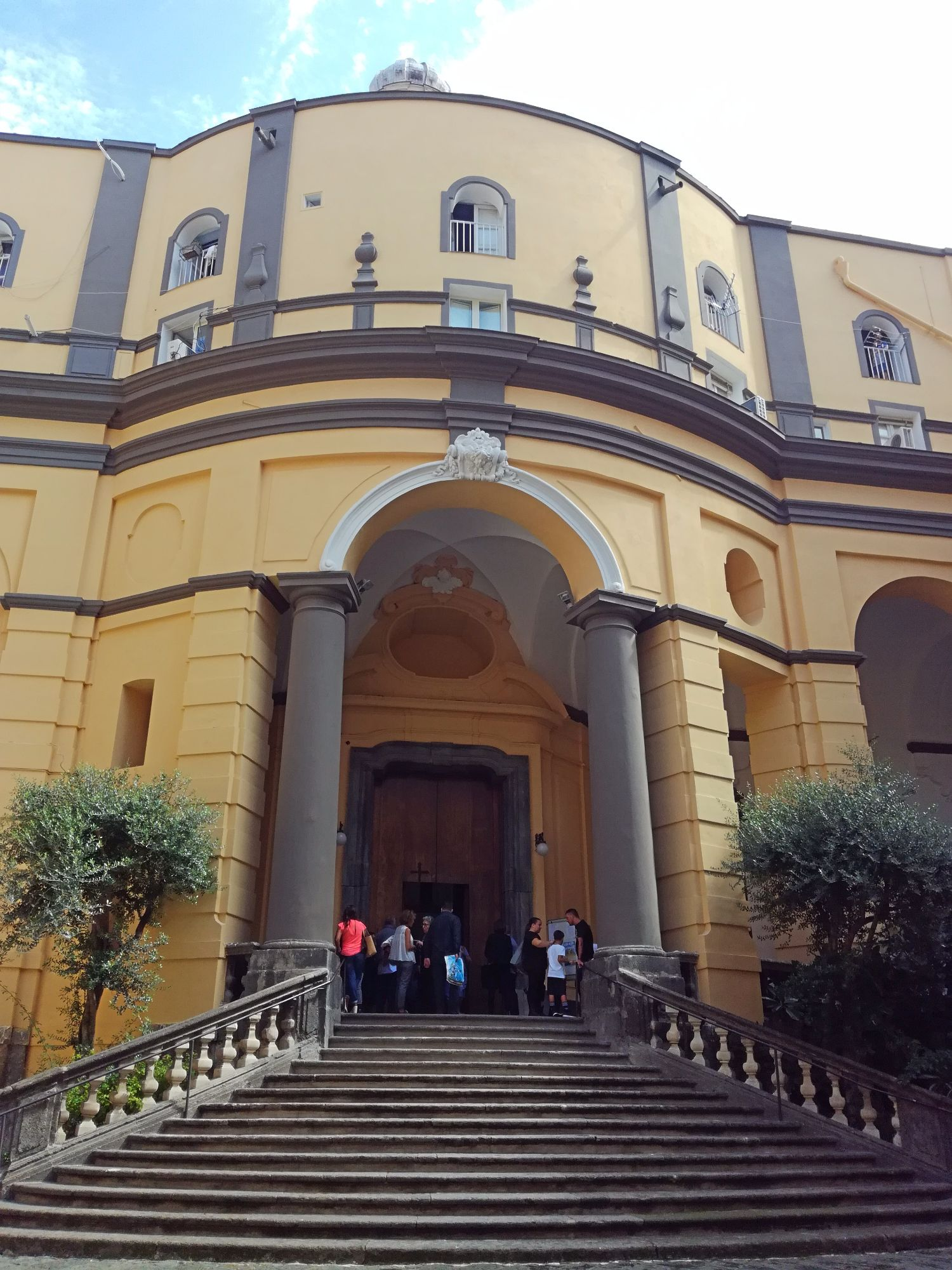
Facade

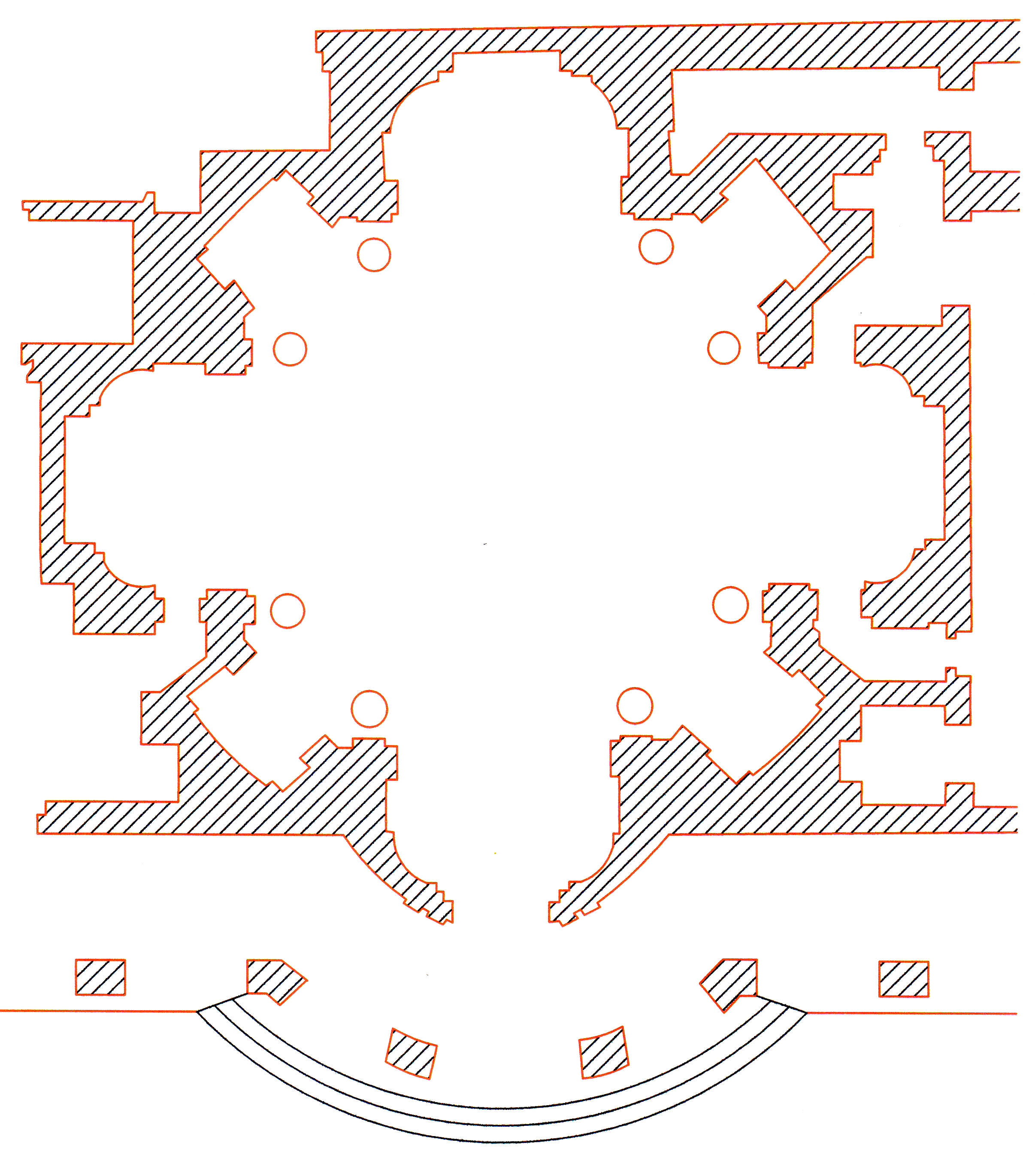
Fanzago's layout for church from Archivio Storico di Napoli

Santa Maria Egiziaca a Pizzofalcone is a Baroque-style, Roman Catholic, Basilica church on the street of the titular name in the hill of Pizzofalcone, in the historic center of Naples, region of Campania, Italy. The church layout was initially designed by Cosimo Fanzago.

== History ==
A small church was located at the site in 1616, but in 1639, a group of five Augustinian monks from the convent associated with the church of Santa Maria Egiziaca a Forcella founded a convent in a palace next to the small church. In 1648, they first hired Cosimo Fanzago to design the church. In 1665, the role fell to Francesco Antonio Picchiatti, and in 1691 to 1716 to Antonio Galluccio. The latter architects modified Fanzago's designs significantly.

== Architecture ==
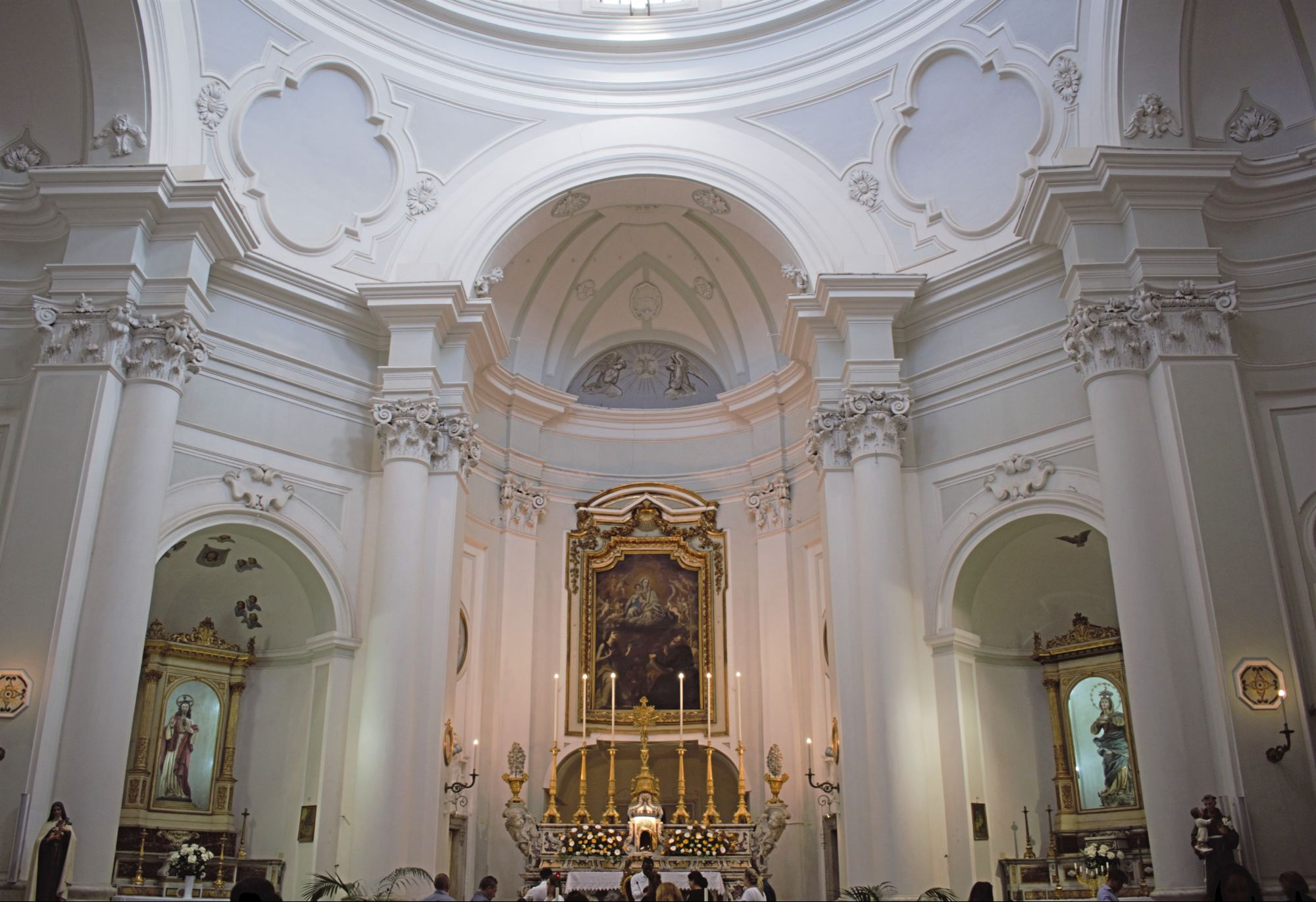
Interior of Church

The entrance contains a scenic staircase, designed, as well as the dome, by Guglielmelli. It leads to a striking convex facade. The interior has stucco decoration and maiolica tiles. The altars are in polychrome marble. The balustrade of the altar has diverse coats of arms of noble families that patronized construction.

The church contains a Virgin and Saints painted by Paolo De Matteis. The main altarpiece is Virgin (1738) by Giuseppe Bastelli. Other paintings include a Santa Maria Egiziaca and Sant'Agostino, by Onofrio Palumbo. The church has three 18th-century wooden statues by Nicola Fumo, depicting an Guardian Angel, the Immaculate Conception, and St Michael Archangel.

== Bibliography ==
- Vincenzo Regina, Le chiese di Napoli. Viaggio indimenticabile attraverso la storia artistica, architettonica, letteraria, civile e spirituale della Napoli sacra, Newton e Compton editore, Napoli 2004.
- Donatella Mazzoleni, Tra Castel dell'Ovo e Sant'Elmo il percorso delle orivini, Electa, Napoli, 1995.
