= Paolo de Maio =

Italian painter (1703–1784)

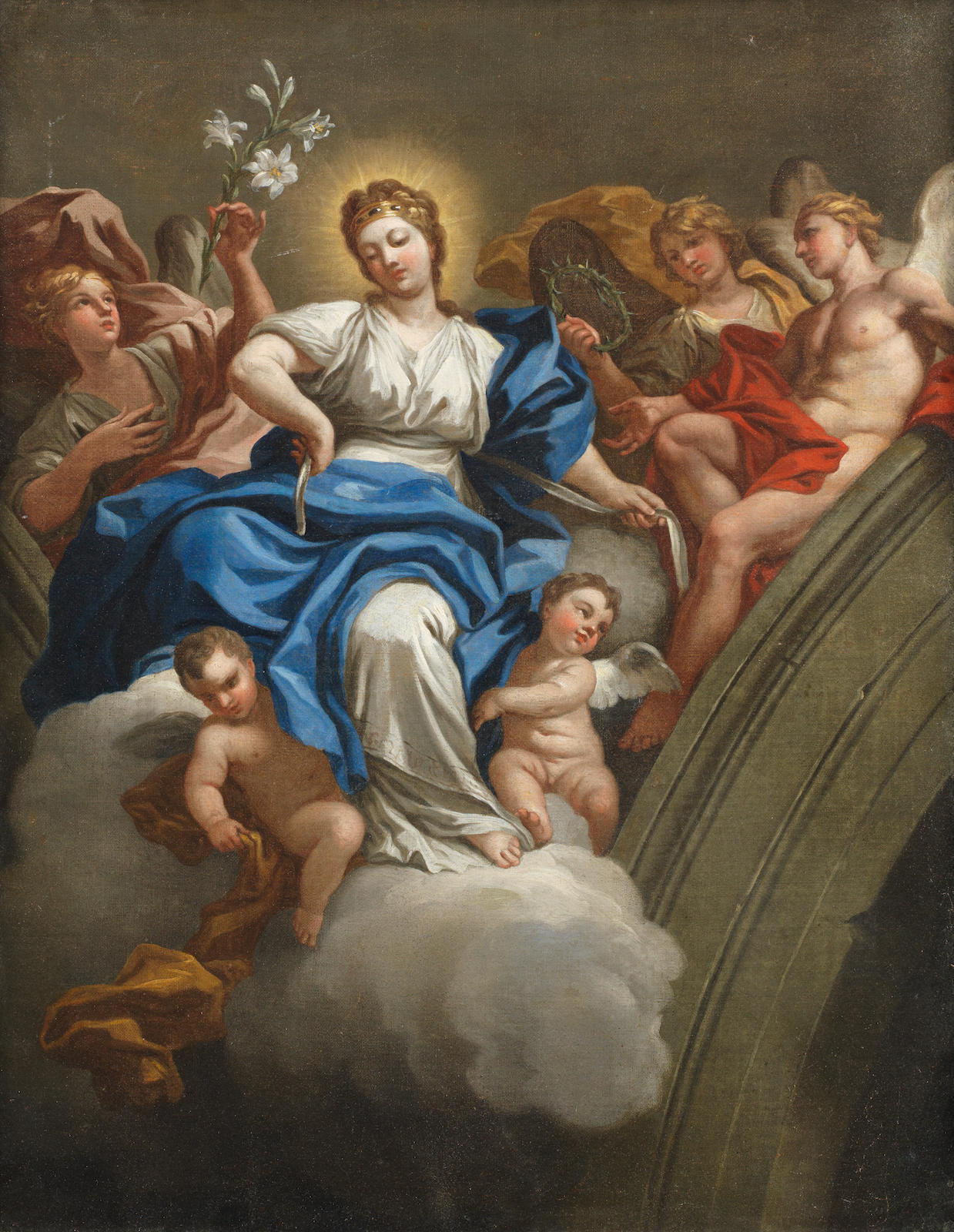
The Eritrean Sibyl

Paolo de Maio or Paolo de Majo (15 January 1703 – 20 April 1784) was an Italian painter of the late-Baroque or Rococo period.

== Biography ==
Paolo de Maio was born in Marcianise, province of Caserta, in the region of Campania. His brother Ludovico de Majo (born in Maricianise on 12 October 1695) was also a painter.

Paolo de Maio was a pupil of Francesco Solimena in Naples. He was prolific in Naples, painting the cupola and around the windows for the church of Santa Maria Egiziaca a Forcella; a San Domenico (1742) for the church of Gesù e Maria at Corso Umberto; a San Niccolò (1772) for the church of Santa Maria delle Grazie a Caponapoli; the Four Evangelists for the church of Trinità in via Roma; as well as frescoes for the ceiling of the church of Monte Cassino.

He painted a canvas depicting San Gennaro for a church in Mugnano del Cardinale, as well as Evangelists (1782) for the church of Verginiani in Casamarciano. He painted a number of canvases in the 1760s for the church of the Camaldoli of Nola (Visciano).

Paolo de Maio died in Naples.
