= Sebeto =

River of ancient Neapolis

The Sebéto was a river which ran through the Greek city of Neapolis, now Naples in Italy. 5th and 4th century BC coins show its ancient Greek name Sepeithos, meaning 'fast-flowing'. It is commemorated by the Baroque Fontana del Sebeto.

Several ancient chronicles state that Neapolis was divided from Partenope or Palepolis by a river, partly navigable, "between monte S. Erasmo and monte di Patruscolo". This puts the river mouth on what is now the site of piazza Municipio. Quintus Publilius Philo camped his Roman army at this river mouth during his siege of the cities.
