= Santa Maria Egiziaca a Forcella =

Church building in Naples, Italy

Church of Santa Maria Egiziaca a Forcella
- Chiesa di Santa Maria Egiziaca a Forcella
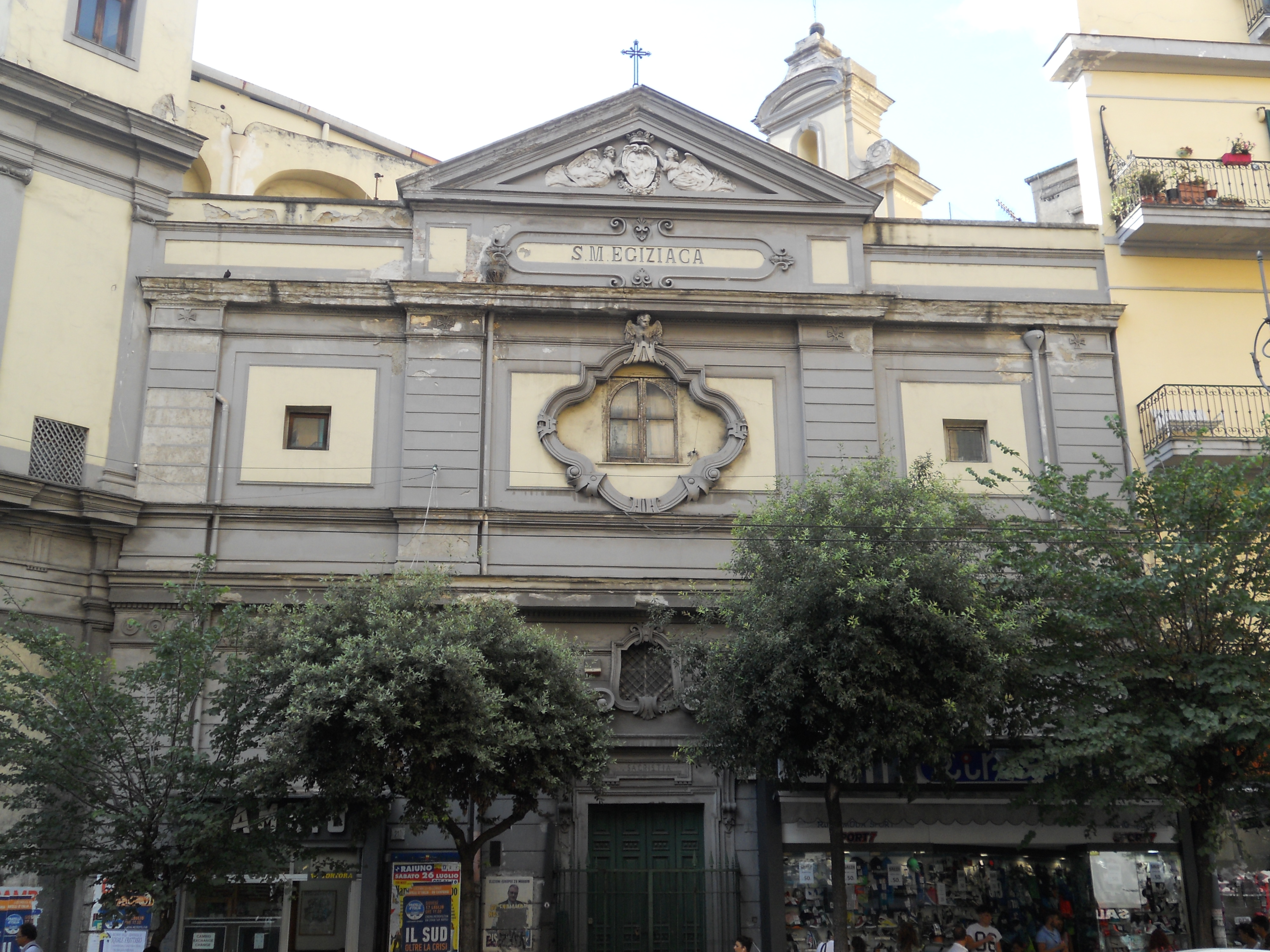
- The facade of Santa Maria Egiziaca a Forcella in Naples .
- Church of Santa Maria Egiziaca a Forcella
- 40.849634°N 14.264282°E
- Location: Naples; Province of Naples, Campania
- Country: Italy
- Denomination: Roman Catholic

History
- Status: Active

Architecture
- Architectural type: Church
- Style: Baroque architecture

Administration
- Diocese: Roman Catholic Archdiocese of Naples

Santa Maria Egiziaca a Forcella, also known as the Church of Santa Maria Egiziaca all'Olmo, is a Baroque-style, Roman Catholic church located in the quartiere di Forcella, in the city of Naples, Italy.

== History ==
The church was founded in 1342 under the patronage of Queen Sancha of Aragon. The queen and her husband were very devout; and Sancha herself entered a monastery of the Poor Clares after her husband's death. The church and attached buildings served as a Magdalene asylum, meant to shelter donne di mondo convertite (prostitutes). The titular saint, Mary of Egypt, had history of repenting a life of lust and prostitution, and converting herself into a saintly hermit. The function of the convent as a home for fallen women was later pursued mostly by Santa Maria Maddalena, and this church became attached to a small nunnery for aristocratic women.

The church underwent reconstructions in 1500 by Gabriele d'Agnolo, and in 1684 by Dionisio Lazzari. The latter reconstruction gave the church its present Baroque appearance. The original facade faced the piazza dell'Olmo, and it is also sometimes named with the suffix all'Olmo.

== Interior ==
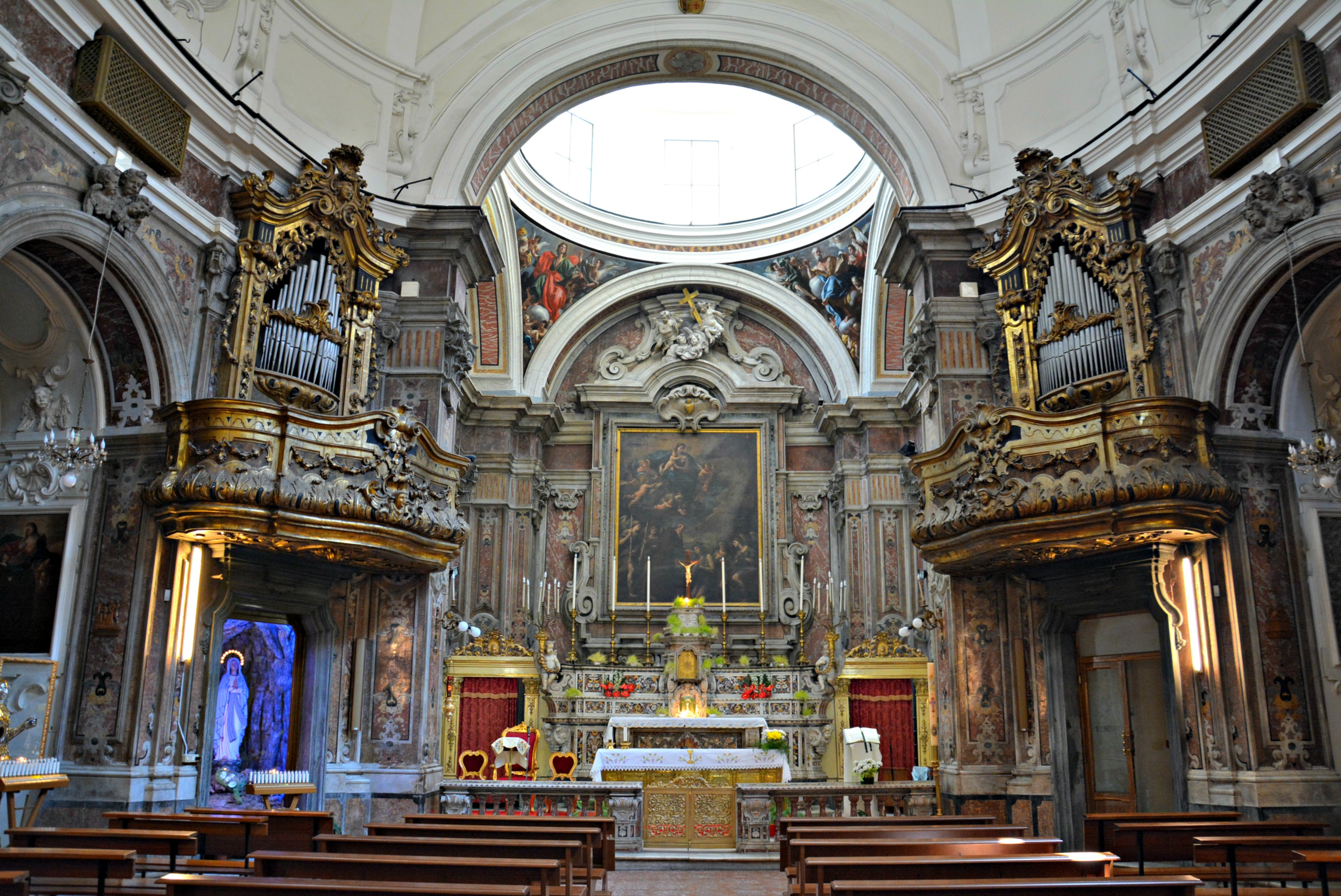
Interior.

The interior is decorated with polychrome marble by Nicola Tagliacozzi Canale. The presbytery displays paintings by Paolo de Maio. The elaborate main altar (1713) was completed by Gennaro Ragozzino, and hosts an altarpiece depicting First communion of Santa Maria Egiziaca (1696) by Andrea Vaccaro. Flanking the altar are paintings depicting The Conversion and Flight from Egypt, by Luca Giordano.

The second chapel on the right has an altarpiece depicting Virgin of the Rosary and Saints by Fabrizio Santafede. The third chapel of the right has two canvases:Madonna and Saints Angelo and Clare Montefalco and Saints Cajetan and Francis by Francesco Solimena. One chapel housed an altarpiece of Mary and St Anne with Angels crowning the Virgin Mary attributed to Giordano. Among the other works in the church are Madonna with Saints Augustine and Monica by Solimena, an Immaculate Conception by Ferrante Amendola (pupil of Solimena), a Young Virgin Mary by Paolo de Matteis, and a San Nicola by Giacomo Farelli.

Naples has another church dedicated to Santa Maria Egiziaca (Saint Mary of Egypt who died in the fourth century) on a hill of Pizzofalcone, which has the name of the church is Santa Maria Egiziaca a Pizzofalcone).

== Bibliography ==
- Vincenzo Regina, Le chiese di Napoli. Viaggio indimenticabile attraverso la storia artistica, architettonica, letteraria, civile e spirituale della Napoli sacra, Newton and Compton editor, Naples 2004.
