= Fontana del Sebeto, Naples =

Coordinates: 40.823155°N 14.219300°E

The Fontana del Sebeto is a monumental fountain located in largo Sermoneta in the zone of Mergellina of Naples, Italy.

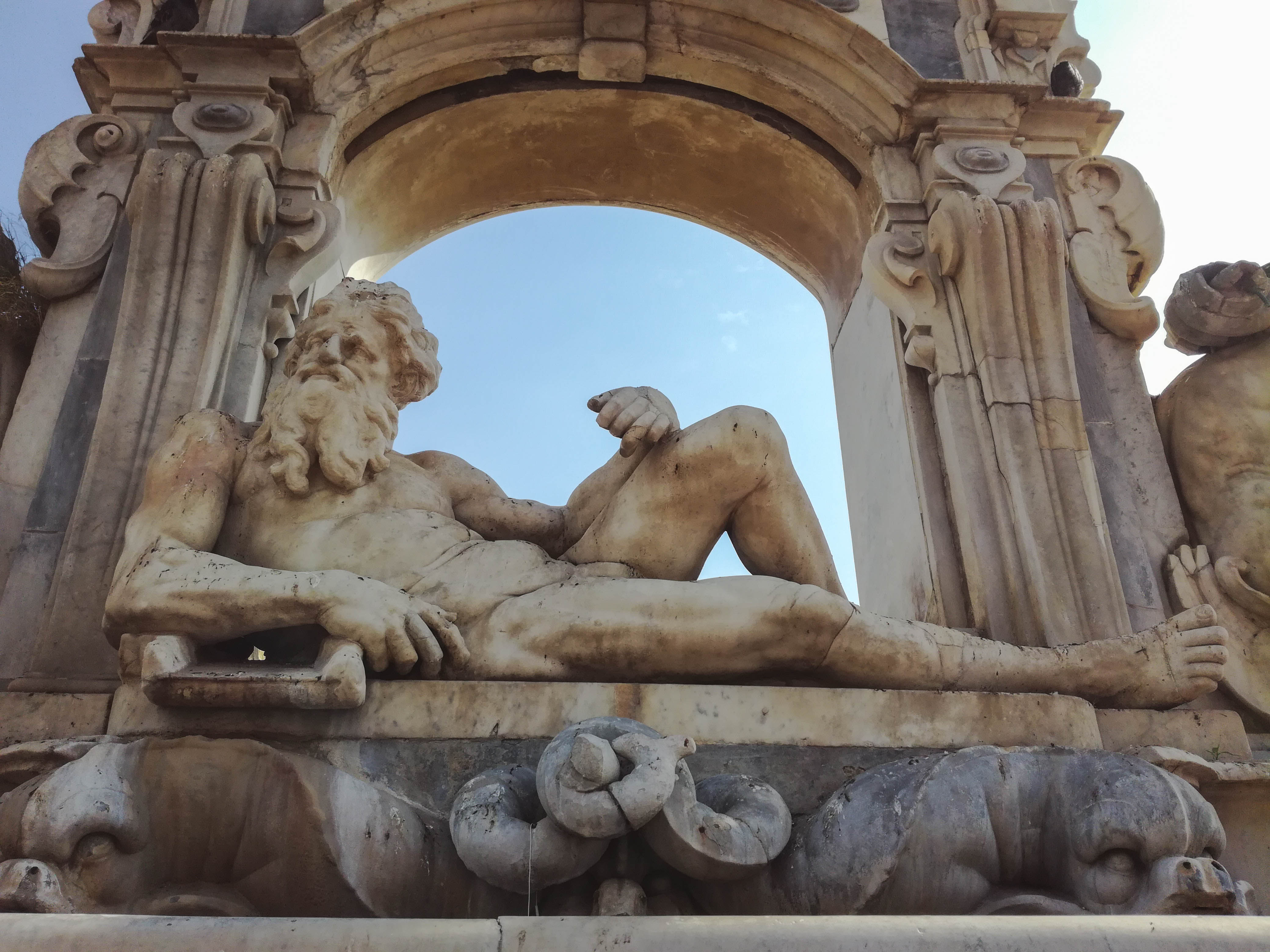
Detail

The fountain was commissioned by the viceroy Emanuele Zunica e Fonseca and built by Carlo Fanzago based on a design by his father, Cosimo. Originally situated on Via Gusmana (now Via Cesario Console), it was moved to the actual location in 1939. The base is made of rock from Piperno; the superior has three basins of marble. The central one has two marine monsters who spout water. The central arch has a recumbent old man representing the river Sebeto, which formerly coursed through the center of town. Two Tritons spread the water to lateral basins. Atop the fountain are the shields with the heraldry of the viceroy, the King of Spain, and the city of Naples.

== Bibliography ==
- Aurelio De Rose, Le fontane di Napoli, Roma, Newton & Compton, 1994.
