= Santa Maria dei Miracoli, Syracuse =

Church in Sicily, Italy

Santa Maria dei Miracoli
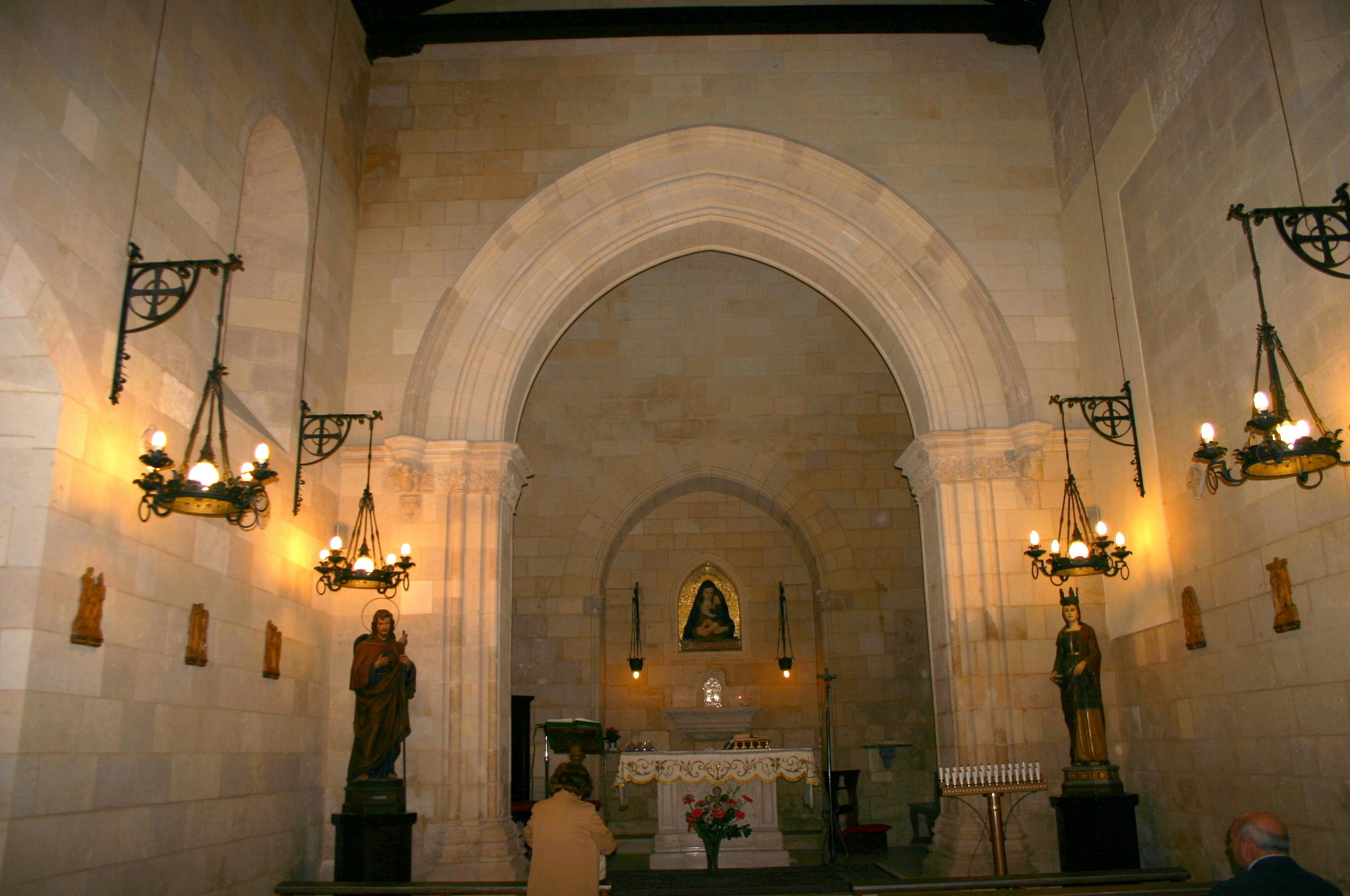
- Inside of church

Religion
- Affiliation: Catholic Church
- Province: Province of Syracuse

Location
- Location: Syracuse, Italy
- Interactive map of Santa Maria dei Miracoli

Architecture
- Type: Church

Santa Maria dei Miracoli (Saint Mary of the Miracles) is a Roman Catholic church located on via dei Miracoli and via dei Cordari, on the island of Ortigia, in the historic city center of Syracuse in Sicily, Italy.

== Description ==
The church was built at the site of a prior church dedicated to St George, and the church is also sometimes referred to as San Giorgio ai Miracoli. The new dedication was adopted when icon of the Madonna, housed in the church, was said to have led to the cessation of a season of the plague in 1500–1501. The church was affiliated with the Confraternity dei SS. Martiri Crispino e Crispiniano, patron saints of the cobblers and furriers. The church was damaged by the 1693 Sicily earthquake and rebuilt in the following year. It is likely the Renaissance style main portal dates to prior to the earthquake, with a lunette with a relief of the Madonna and child with Saints Roch and Sebastian. To the left of the entrance is an aedicula with a Madonna and Child by Giovanni della Robbia.
