= Santa Maria dei Miracoli, Ragusa =

Church in Ragusa, Italy

Coordinates: 36.924453°N 14.74108°E

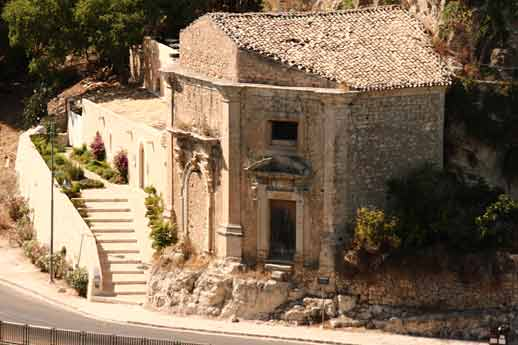
Santa Maria dei Miracoli, Ragusa.

Santa Maria dei Miracoli (i.e. "St. Mary of the Miracles") is a Baroque church located in Ragusa, Sicily.

It was built in the mid-seventeenth century, following the discovery of an image of the Madonna with her Child Jesus. The discovery of the sacred image was considered a miraculous event and gave impetus to the construction of a temple in honor of the Madonna.
