= Santa Maria degli Angeli alle Croci =

Church of Santa Maria degli Angeli alle Croci
- Chiesa di Santa Maria degli Angeli alle Croci
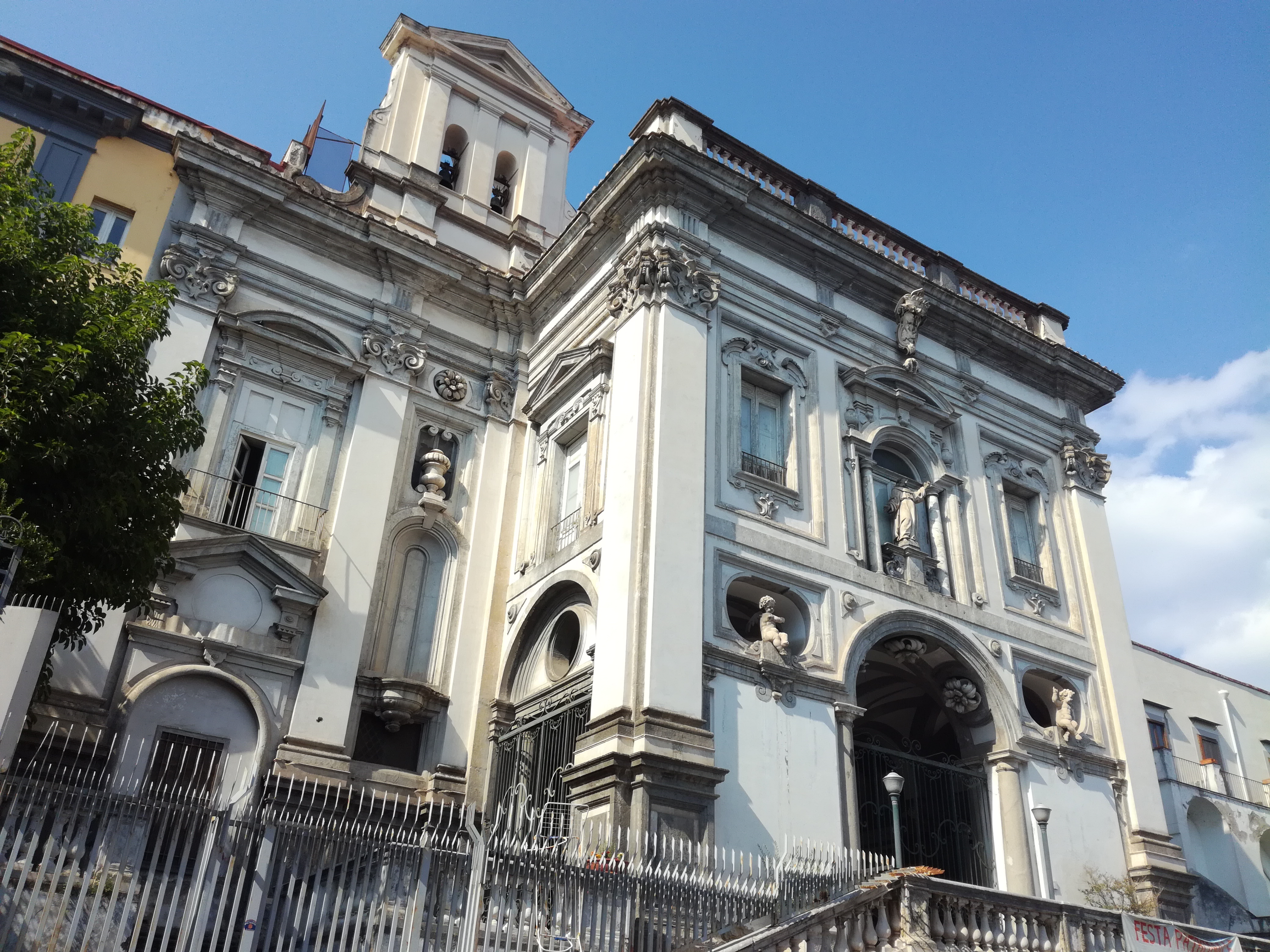
- Façade.
- Church of Santa Maria degli Angeli alle Croci
- 40.8617°N 14.2601°E
- Location: Via Veterinaria; Naples; Province of Naples, Campania
- Country: Italy
- Denomination: Roman Catholic

History
- Status: Active

Architecture
- Architectural type: Church
- Style: Baroque architecture
- Groundbreaking: 1581

Administration
- Diocese: Roman Catholic Archdiocese of Naples

Santa Maria degli Angeli alle Croci is a Baroque style, Roman Catholic church in Naples, Italy, located on via Veterinaria, near the Botanical Gardens. The extramural church gained its name because the road leading up to this hill here passed a series of crosses.

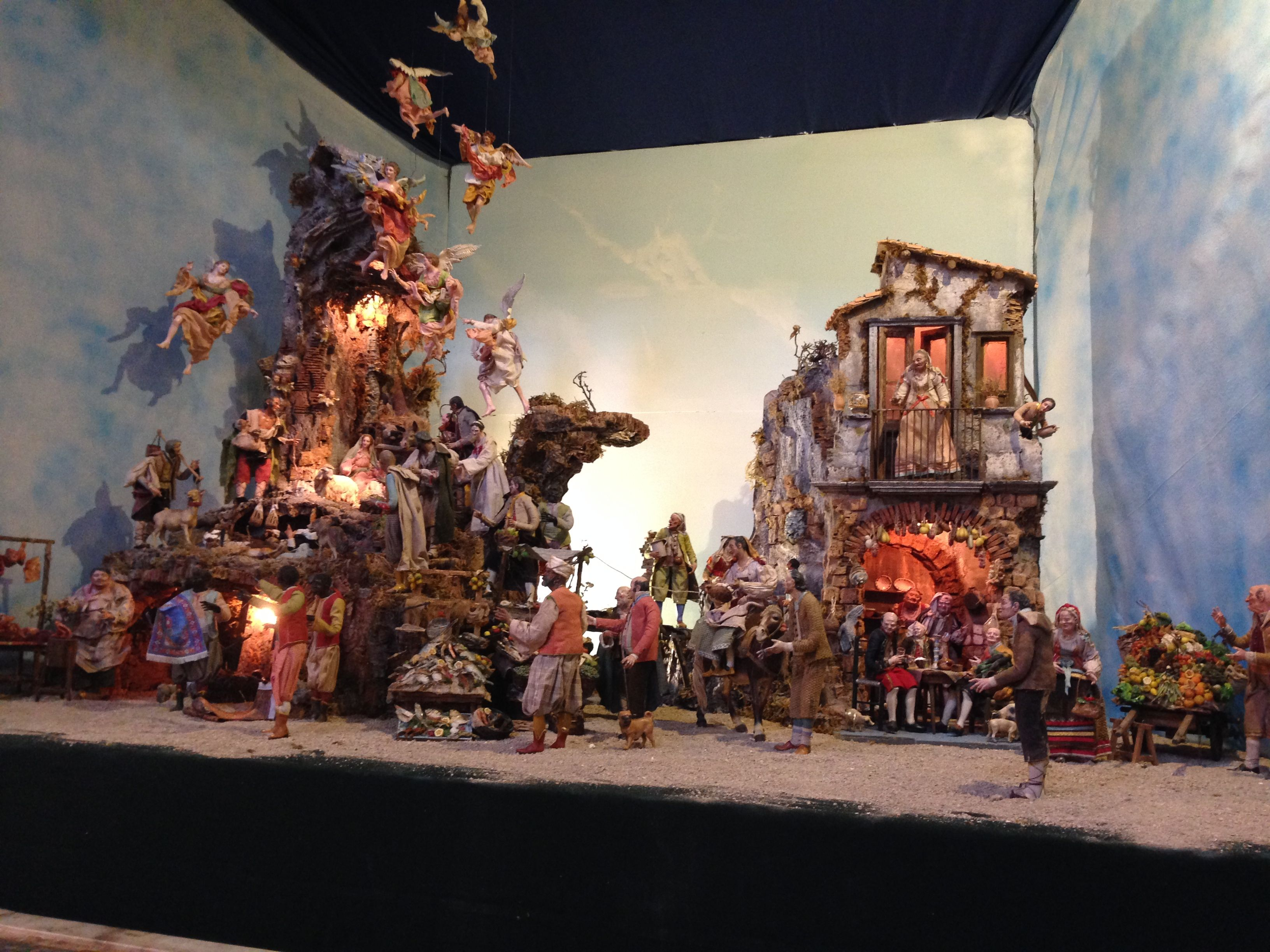
Presepe in church

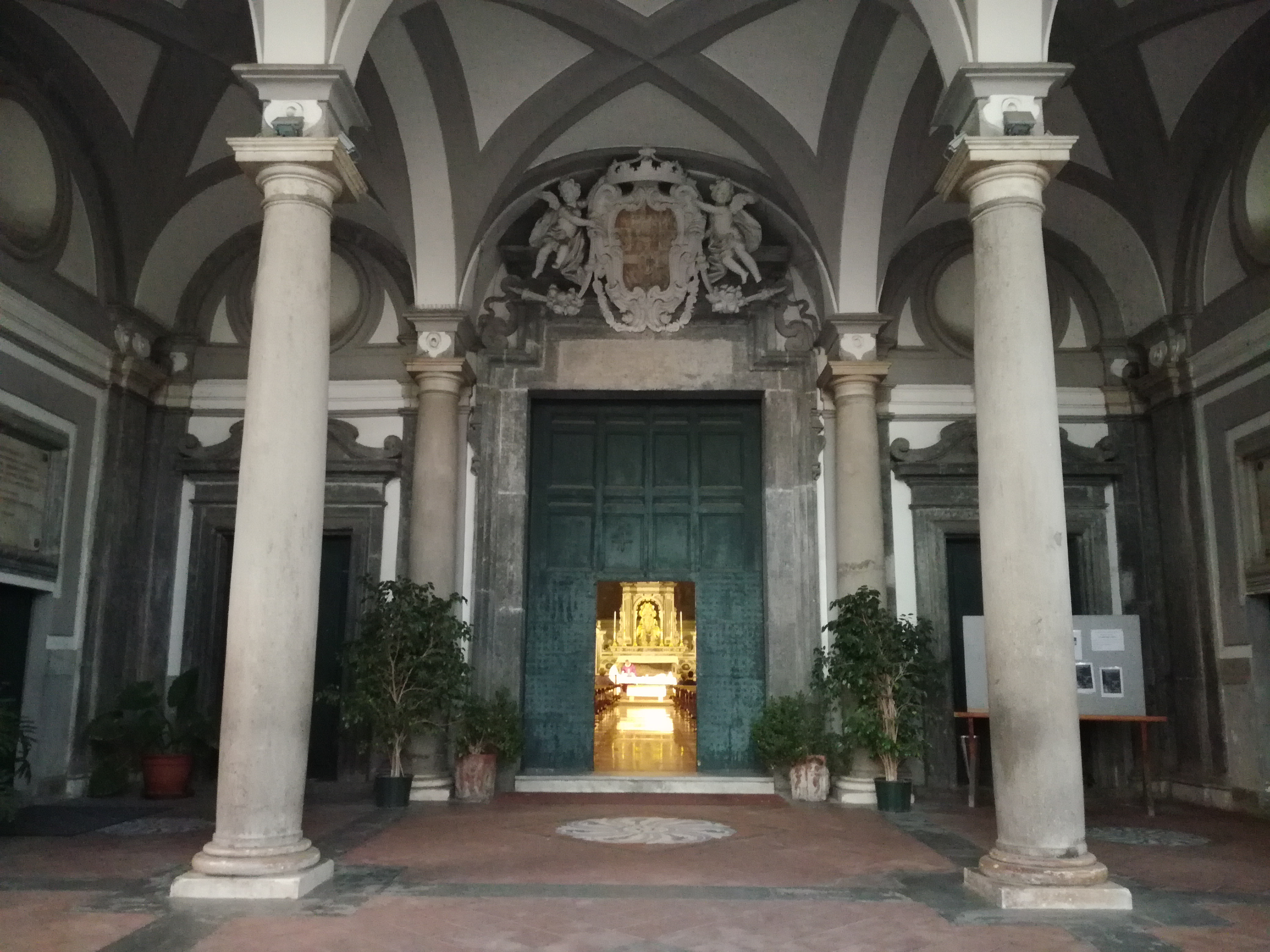
Vestibule.

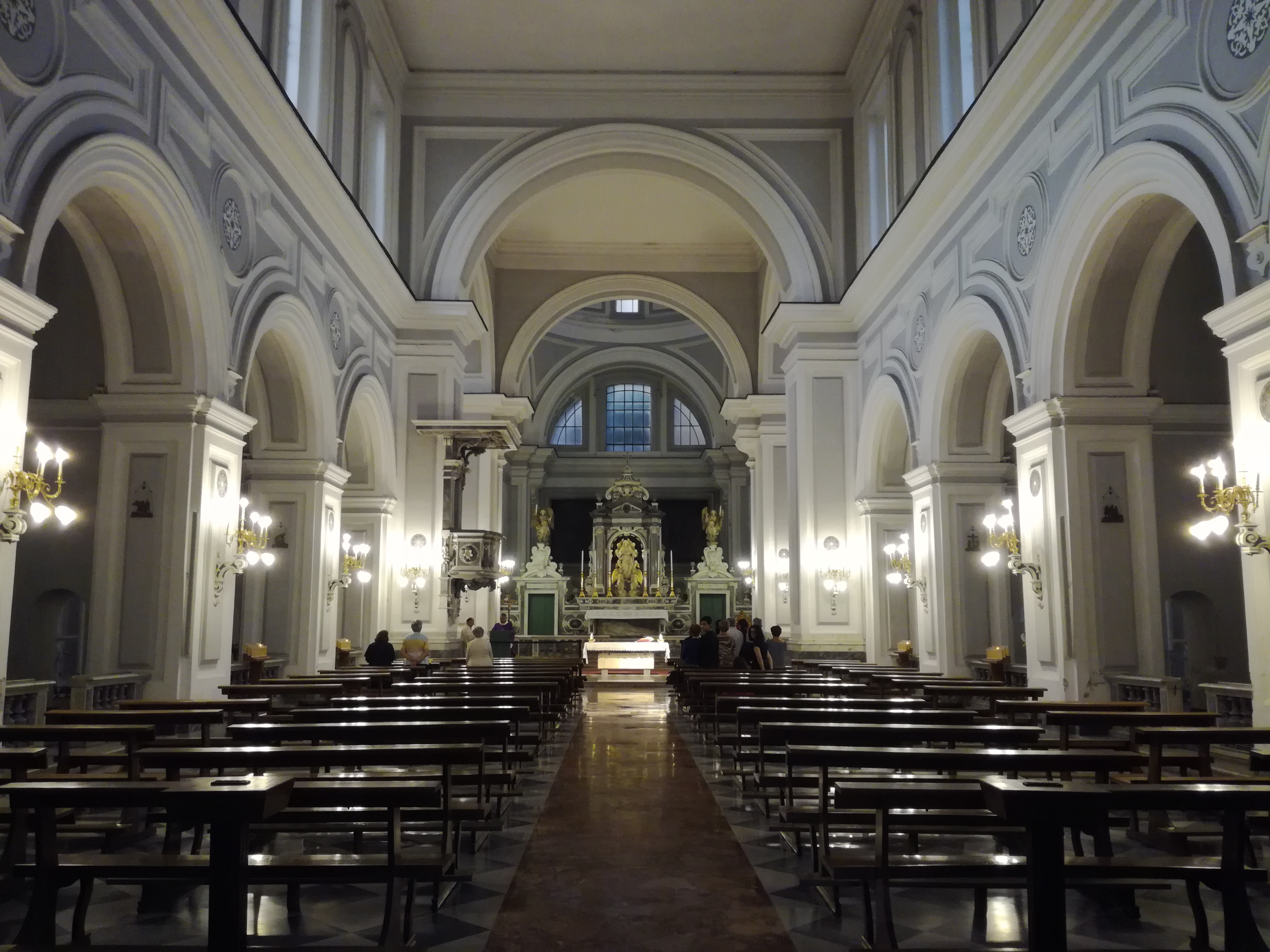
Interior.

== History ==
The church was founded in 1581, but underwent reconstruction in 1638 by the architect Cosimo Fanzago. He avoided the prevalent polychrome marble decoration of churches, and adhered to the characteristic plainness of many Observant Franciscan Order churches. The columns from within the church were likely appropriated from another older church. The main altar has 17th century wooden statues by Fra' Diego da Careri. The statue of St Francis and putti on the facade are attributed by some to Fanzago, but some documents point to a little known Franciscan friar-sculptor. Fanzago also sculpted the statues of St Peter and St Paul for the holy water fonts. His son Carlo Fanzago sculpted a bas-relief for the main altar depicting the Deposed Christ. The Cloister has frescoes depicting Gospel stories by Belisario Corenzio.

The church was associated with the Franciscan friar Giovanni da Napoli. This friar was a key intermediary in arranging the marriage of the Viceroy Duke of Medina with Anna Carafa. The friar became personal acquaintance of the Spanish king, Philip IV of Spain, and in 1638, through the intervention of cardinal Francesco Barberini, he was appointed general of Osservanza dei Francescani Riformati by Pope Urban VIII, and the next year elected general the Franciscan Order, and then in 1645 at Toledo, Minister General of the Order. He died in 1648 as Archbishop of Valencia.

Since 1815, the monastery has housed the Faculty of Veterinary Medicine of the University of Naples.
