= Cosimo Fanzago =

Italian architect and sculptor

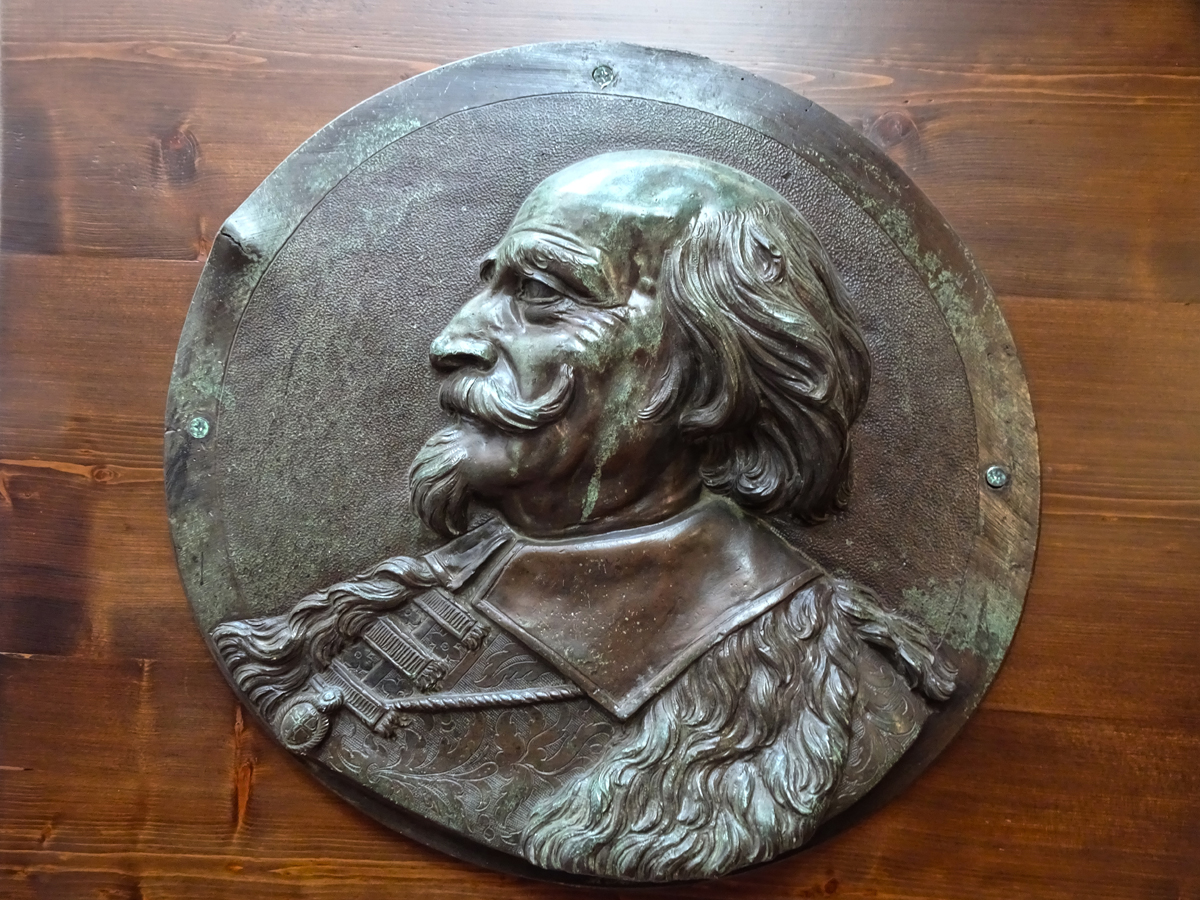
- Self-portrait
- Born: 12 October 1591; Clusone, Duchy of Milan
- Died: 13 February 1678 (aged 86); Naples, Kingdom of Naples
- Known for: Sculpture
- Movement: Baroque

Cosimo Fanzago (12 October 1591 – 13 February 1678) was an Italian architect and sculptor, active in Naples, Italy in the Baroque period.

== Biography ==
=== Early life and education ===
Fanzago was born in Clusone (current Province of Bergamo) on 12 October 1591. He came from a patrician family whose members included engineers, architects and bronze-casters.

In 1608, after a short stay in Chieti, he moved to Naples, where he trained as a mason and sculptor in the workshop of Geronimo d’Auria. From 1612 to 1620 he ran a workshop in partnership with his father-in-law, the marble-worker Angelo Landi, and during that time produced many works of sculptural decoration, in particular for Neapolitan churches and chapels (e.g. three stremmi for the façade of the Palazzo degli Studi in 1614–16), but also at Catanzaro and Barletta (e.g. the decoration of the Gentile Chapel in Barletta in 1620). In the early 1620s he became an assistant to Giovanni Giacomo di Conforto, one of the leading architects in Naples, and soon extended his scope from details to more complex architectural tasks, for example in Santa Trinità delle Monache, where he designed the church porch and external flight of steps, and at the Certosa di San Martino, where he assumed control of the extensive building works after Conforto’s death in 1631.

From then until 1656, he created some of his finest work at the Certosa, including the completion and decoration of the Chiostro Grande (1623–43), with seven large portals containing imaginatively decorated frames and busts of Carthusian saints, the church façade (1636–50) and the decoration of certain apartments.

=== Early career ===
The first church built entirely by Fanzago, the church of the Ascensione a Chiaia in Naples, was begun in 1626 but only completed, with its dome, in 1662; it has a simple central structure over a Greek cross and is much less ambitious in design than his oval church of San Sebastiano (1628). In 1629, he executed another important commission, the bronze gate of the Royal Chapel of the Treasure of St. Januarius, Naples.

Fanzago also designed numerous richly inlaid altars, in which his virtuosity as a marble-worker was greatly enhanced by his formal inventiveness as an architect. Fanzago’s altars are mostly free-standing, of the box or aedicule type, have offertory doors at the sides and are surmounted by statues to form a semi-transparent division between the sanctuary and the choir. The most important are at San Nicola al Lido, Venice (1629–34), Santa Maria La Nova, Naples (1632–4), Santi Severino e Sossio, Naples (1635–41), at the Benedictine Abbey, Montecassino (1636), and at the Neapolitan churches of Santa Maria di Costantinopoli (1639–45), San Pietro a Majella (1640–47) and San Domenico Maggiore (1640–52).

Fanzago’s workshop was responsible for extensive chapel decorations and much building and rebuilding of churches in Naples (e.g. San Giuseppe dei Vecchi, from 1634; Santa Maria degli Angeli alle Croci, from 1639), as well as palaces (e.g. façade of the Palazzo Firrao, 1636–40) and public fountains (e.g. Fontana Medina, 1634–40; Fontana del Sebeto (1635–7).

=== Mature work ===
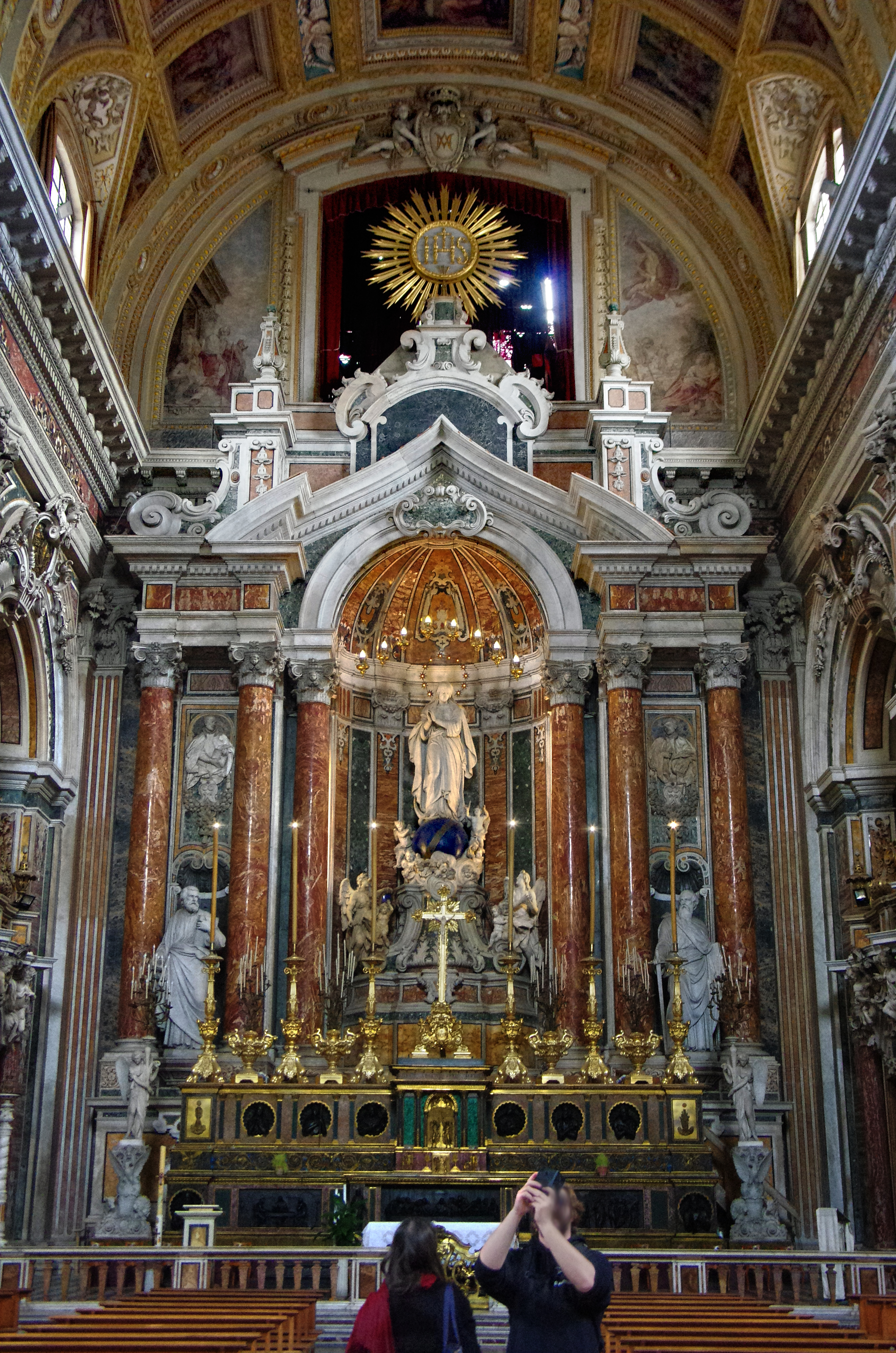
Main altar in Gesù Nuovo, Naples

About 1636, Fanzago and his assistants were engaged on a wall altar and pulpit for the church of the Agustinas Descalzas at Salamanca, commissioned by the Viceroy of Naples, Don Manuel de Acevedo y Zúñiga, 6th Conde de Monterrey. In 1636–60 Fanzago executed the Guglia di San Gennaro, a votive column in honour of the patron saint of Naples: built in the style of an ephemeral festive structure, this work became a prototype for similar monuments throughout southern Italy and may also have served as a model for Central European plague columns in the Baroque style.

From 1630 Fanzago worked for the Neapolitan Jesuits, who commissioned him to build the altar of St. Francis Xavier in the Gesù Vecchio; about 1634–6 he planned the church of San Francesco Saviero, which was completed according to modified plans in 1665. His original design (Paris, Bibliothèque nationale de France) shows the spatial concept of an elongated cruciform church with a dome; the three square bays of the nave combine with the side compartments to form a type of Wandpfeilerkirche.

In San Giorgio Maggiore, begun in 1640 for the Congregation of Pious Workers Rural Catechists, Fanzago brought this idea of space to artistic perfection by a series of three domes increasing in size towards the centre of the church – a form of articulation subtly attuned to his aim of creating a centralized space – and a shaping of the apse derived from Andrea Palladio’s Redentore in Venice ( 1576–80). He also worked at the Gesù Nuovo, the principal Jesuit church in Naples built by Giuseppe Valeriano in 1584–95, creating the two transept altars with their large niche figures (from 1637) and at the same time embarking on a campaign of decoration which continued for decades, and in which all the columns and walls were covered with precious marble incrustations.

Another outstanding work of decoration was the Cappella di Santa Teresa (1640–50) in Santa Teresa degli Studi, Naples. The façade of that church is also by Fanzago, but while it is richly decorated, it gives an architecturally weak effect. His treatment of the façades of the Neapolitan churches Santa Maria della Sapienza (1639–49) and San Giuseppe delle Scalze a Pontecorvo (1643–60) was much more creative. In both cases he had to place a porch before the front wall with a flight of steps within it so as to overcome a considerable difference of level between the street and the church interior, while the crypts could be approached at ground level. The Sapienza façade features a three-arch loggia – in effect three overlapping Serlian windows – set above a podium storey and between end bays with rectangular openings, reached by steps from the street, which give access to a double ramp staircase behind the façade. This leads to the nave, which is at a higher level than the street. At San Giuseppe delle Scalze, the openings in the wall correspond to the complicated layout of the steps: structural and decorative elements merge into an effective scenographic whole. The spatial conception of this church combines the basic form of a trough-vaulted rectangular hall, divided rhythmically into three, with the idea of a cruciform centralised layout closed by an apse at the choir and entrance ends.

Fanzago’s most important secular building, the Villa Donn'Anna (c. 1640–44) at Posillipo, is a massive structure relieved by loggias, niches and corner turrets, spectacularly sited on a rocky promontory. The problem of approach is solved in a remarkable way: the upper floors at the back form a cour d’honneur facing onto the coastal road above, while arches in the reinforced base allow direct access to the sea.

On 25 January 1645 Fanzago was appointed Ingegnere Maggiore del Regno. In 1647, Fanzago supported the Neapolitan revolution led by Masaniello. After the return of Royal authority, he was sentenced to death and had to flee to Rome, where he worked for a decade. He received some minor commissions there (redesigning the interior of San Lorenzo in Lucina and Santa Maria in Via Lata; decorative and sculptural work in Sant'Agostino, Sant'Isidoro and Santa Trinità dei Pellegrini), and for a time took part in the planning of Sant'Agnese in Agone.

=== Later work ===
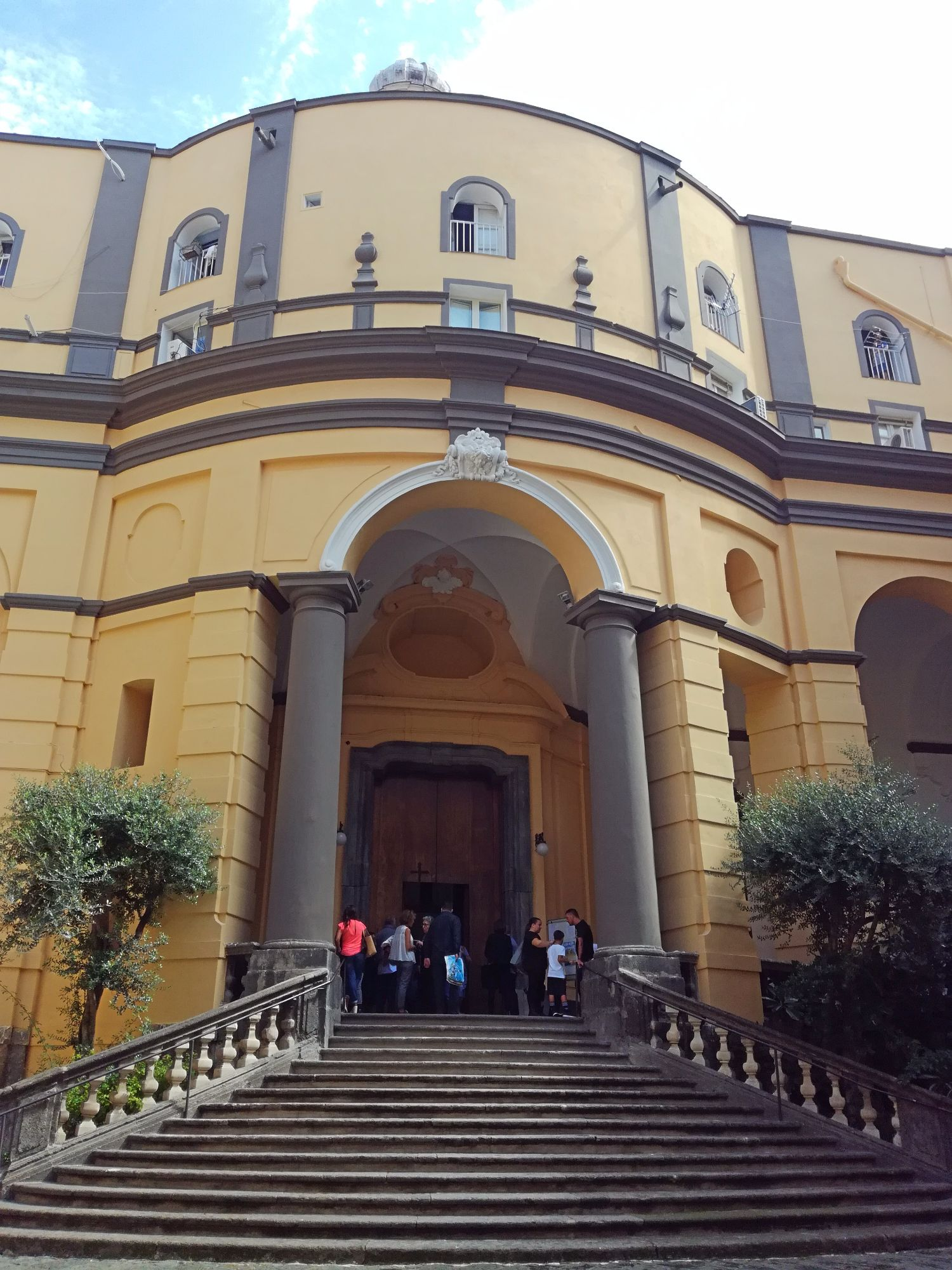
Facade for S. Maria Egiziaca

In 1651, Fanzago returned to Naples and designed the initial layout of the church of Santa Maria Egiziaca a Pizzofalcone (built 1651–1717). This church displays a Greek cross plan, and resembles a hybrid of contemporary Baroque masterpieces by Bernini (dome resembles Sant'Andrea al Quirinale) and Borromini (the plan resembles Sant'Agnese). It is an octagonal domed structure with wide apses radiating in the form of a cross and shallow niches on the smaller diagonal sides. Another perfectly centralized building is Santa Teresa a Chiaia (1650–64), a cruciform church with a dome where the square corner chapels inserted between the arms of the cross are linked to the main space by high openings with architraves and the supports consist of rectangular pillars intersecting one another at right angles. In addition, the choir wall is perforated and decorated with statues in the manner of a triumphal arch.

In his last great church building, Santa Maria Maggiore (1653–75), Fanzago achieved a harmonious synthesis of his most original ideas for the treatment of space. An elongated cruciform church and dome of the type of Rosato Rosati’s San Carlo ai Catinari in Rome (1612), the centralizing effect at Santa Maria Maggiore is accentuated by the much enlarged and lofty crossing under the dome, while the symmetrical unity of the whole scheme is perfected by the longitudinal spatial components having an apse at each end. An altar arcade open to the monks’ choir provides a delightful scenic progression along the main axis.

Fanzago’s final commissions included various works at Avellino and collaboration in some monuments that became landmarks of Naples: the Guglia di San Domenico (1657–8), the Guglia di San Gaetano (1657–70), and the Fountain of Monteoliveto (1668–76). He died on 13 February 1678, aged 87. One of his pupils was Lorenzo Vaccaro.

=== Sculptural works ===
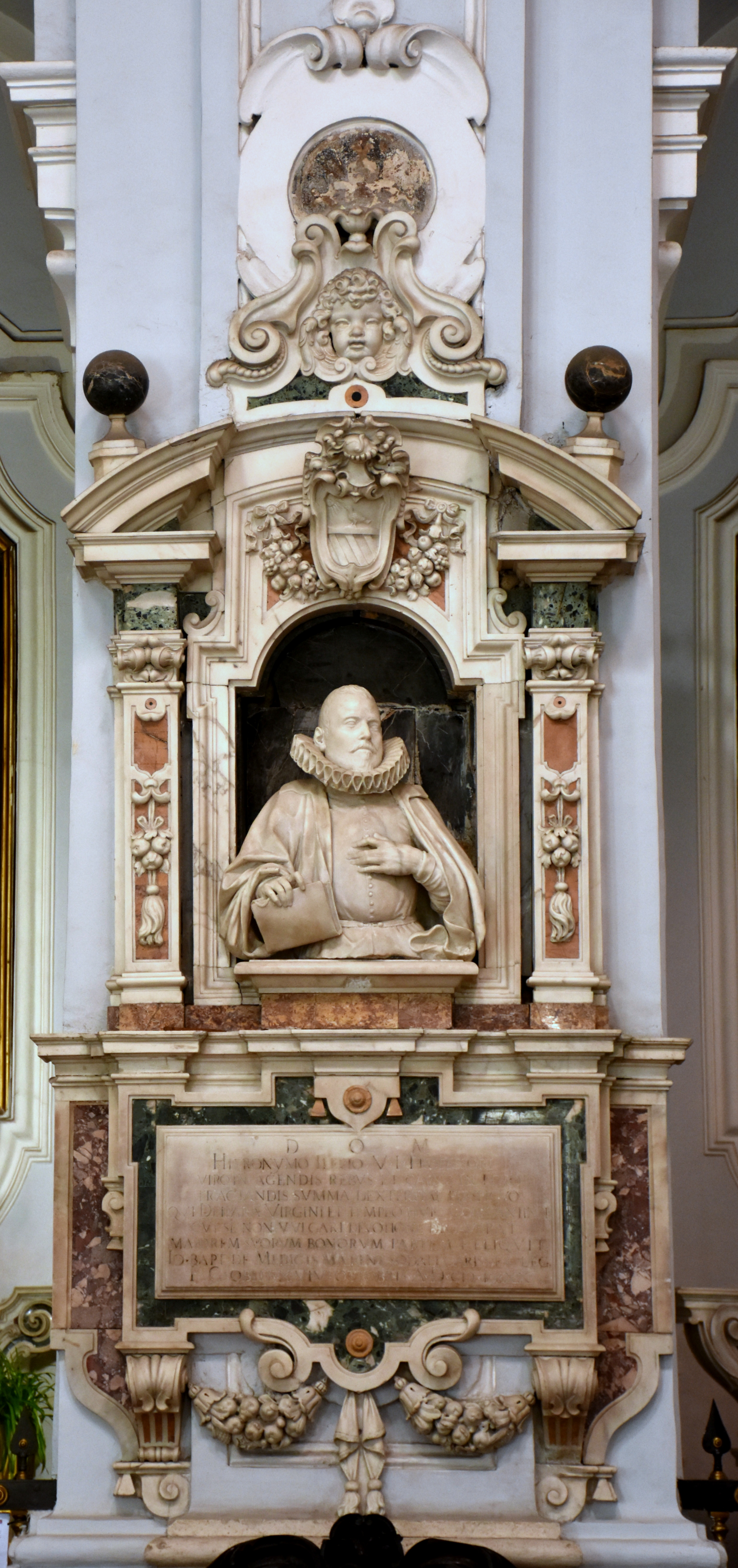
Tomb of Girolamo Flerio (chiesa di Santa Maria di Costantinopoli, Naples)

By 1612, Fanzago had achieved the status of ‘maestro di scoltura di marmo’. His technical virtuosity derived from his training among Tuscan sculptors such as Pietro Bernini, who certainly contributed to his formation as an artist. However, the highly expressive quality of Fanzago’s oeuvre finds its closest parallel in the work of Milanese sculptors active about 1600 (e.g. Annibale Fontana), with which he would have become acquainted in early youth. The tension felt in their work between an exaggerated naturalism of human forms and a free treatment of drapery, contrasting with the physical structure beneath, was developed by Fanzago to a high degree of subjective expressiveness.

His sculptures demonstrate psychological insight, dramatic effect and forceful monumentality, with a subtle delicacy apparent in his relief and surface work. Like Bernini, Fanzago was concerned with synthesising sculpture and architecture, but without acknowledging the innovations of the Roman High Baroque. His main preoccupation was with a formal and material fusion, using newly developed organisational schemata. An essential factor is the highly dynamic ornamentation, the vocabulary of which combines geometrical and floral elements of Mannerist pietra dura with naturalistic scrollwork; in its free and fluent development, it seems at times to anticipate aspects of the Rococo style. Stacked, sawn marble slabs (recalling Wendel Dietterlin’s abstract ornamentation), elegantly cut lancet shapes, repeatedly broken scrolls mutating from strict linearity to organic solidity, and skilfully carved three-dimensional rosettes, festoons, putti and cherubs’ heads are the recurrent set pieces of this decorative art—the trademarks of a mass production based on the craftsmanlike organization of a large workshop, yet full of the master’s artistic inspiration.

Of primary importance to the overall impression is the polychromy of the different sorts of marble. Fanzago’s sublime intarsia work aims at a refinement of nuances (either with grisaille-type combinations or with glowing coloration) and in this way achieves painterly values that give an illusion of atmosphere, light and shade. The result is a charming interplay between trompe-l'œil and a surface pattern, which is one of the artist’s most individual achievements.

== Legacy ==
In his architecture, Fanzago turned functional problems to scenographic effect, concentrating and simplifying the volumetry of his church interiors by the steep proportions he achieved through lengthening the floor plan of his cruciform domed structures while preserving the balance between centralization and longitudinal stress, often screening the choir with an altar arcade to accentuate the feeling of spatial progression.

== Main works in Naples ==
His works in Naples include:

- Guglia di San Gennaro: a votive spire in honour of the patron saint of Naples. It imitates the large portable ephemeral decorations common in religious processions
- model for two other prominent spires, which he helped plan (at the Piazza del Gesù Nuovo and the Piazza San Domenico Maggiore). It was a so-called "plague column"; that is, a spire built in thanks for having been spared from the recent epidemic.

Guglie (Spires) by Cosimo Fanzago in Naples

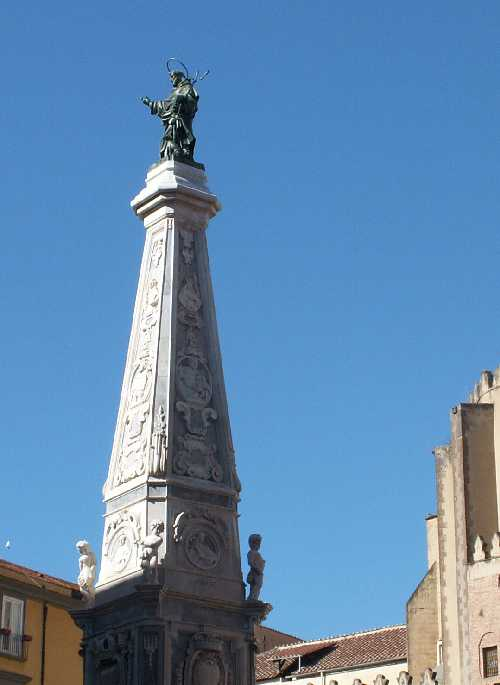
Guglia di San Domenico

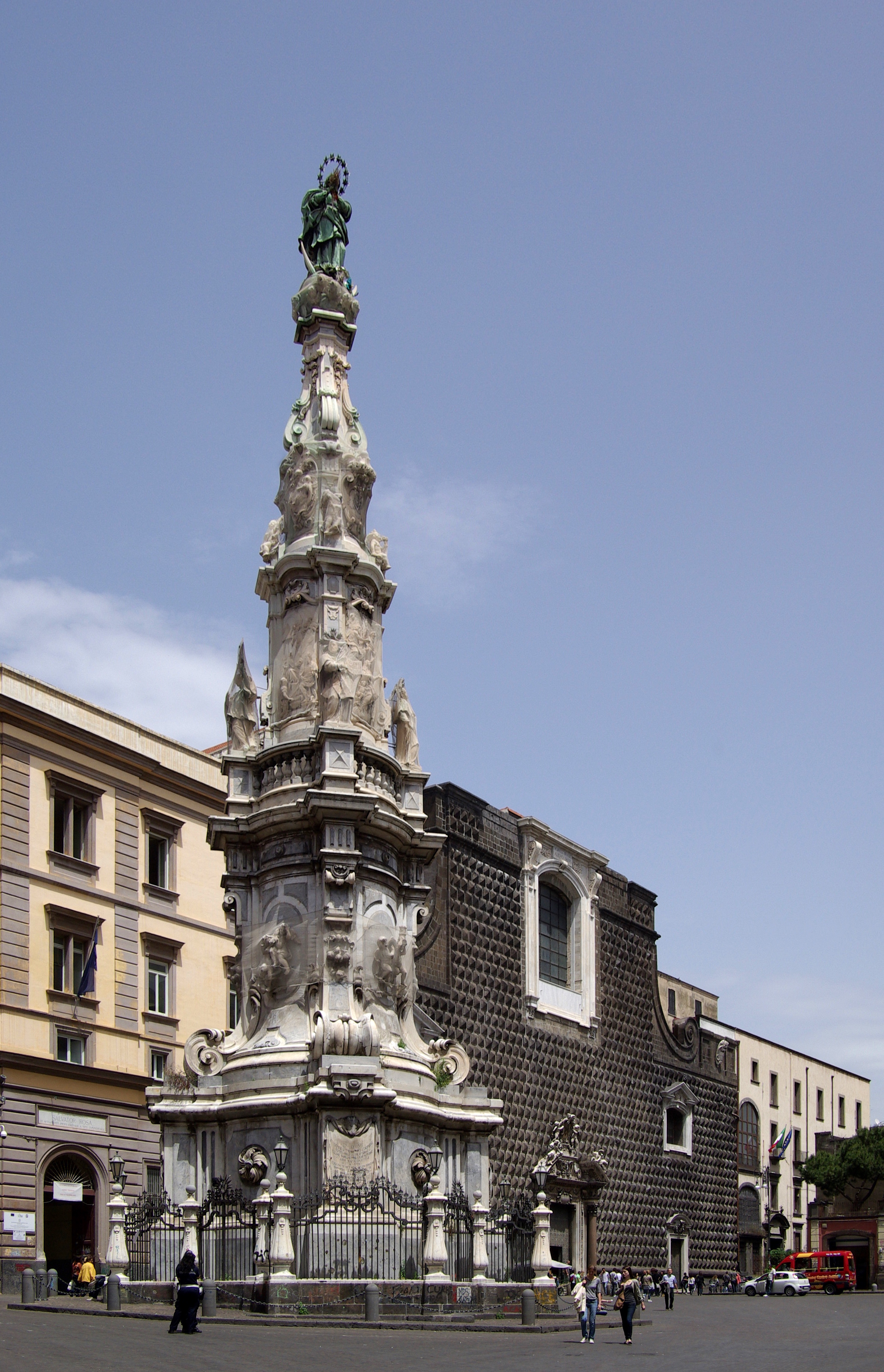
Guglia di Gesù Nuovo

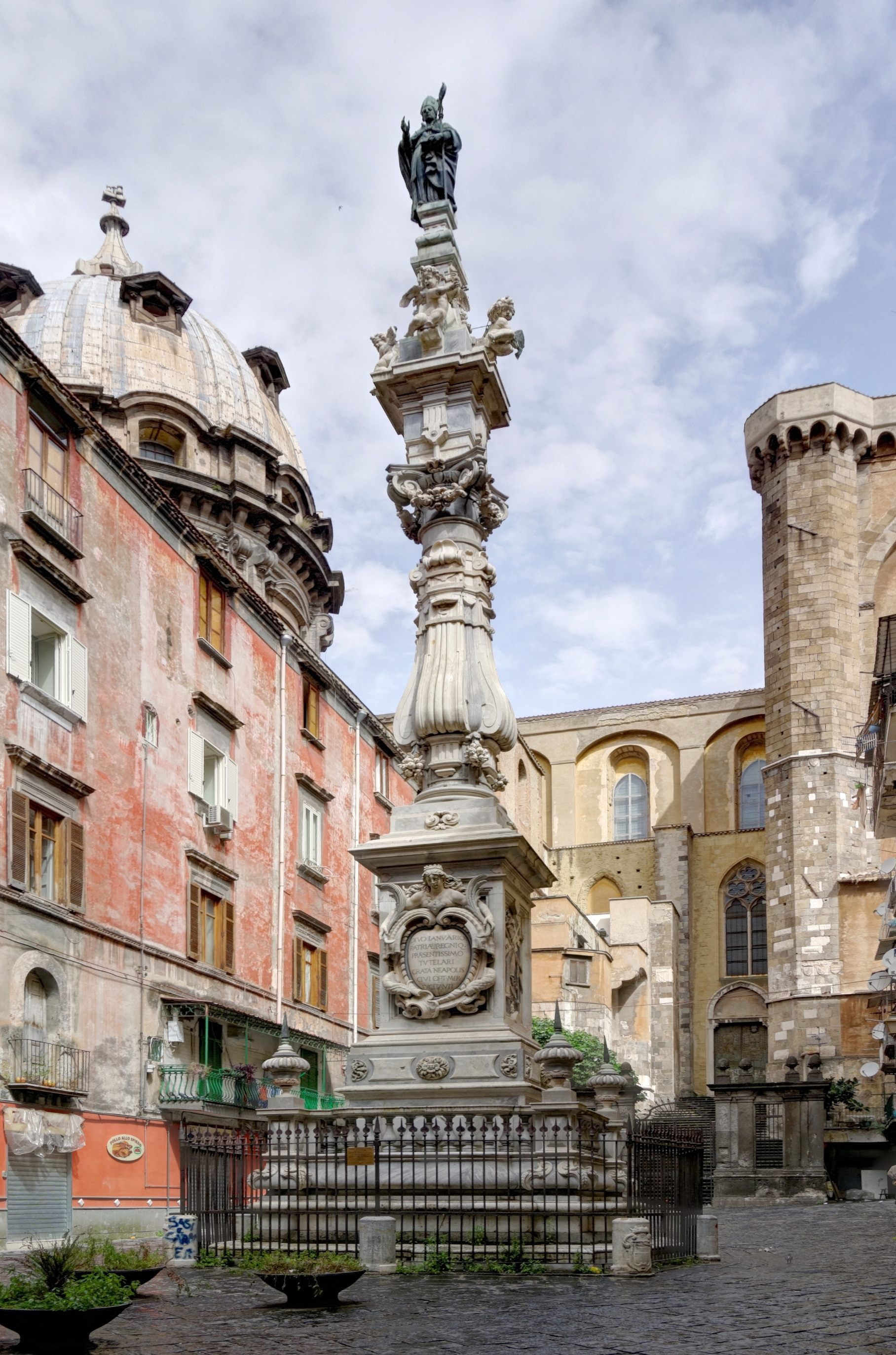
Guglia di San Gennaro

- Extensive work on the Certosa di San Martino, including the spectacular central courtyard with its large portals and busts of Carthusian saints. The church and cloisters are considered to be his masterpiece. The Carthusians paid Fanzago 57,000 ducats over 33 years of work. Between 1660 and 1700, a lawsuit alleging underpayment by the monks wound its way through the Neapolitan courts.
- The facades or facade details of numerous churches, chapels, and civic buildings, including Santa Maria degli Angeli (near the Botanical Gardens), anonymous works within the Cathedral of Naples, the Chiesa dell'Ascensione a Chiaia (1622); the facade of Santa Maria della Sapienza (1638–41); the bronze gate of the chapel of the royal treasury; and the original design for church of San Francesco Saverio (now San Ferdinando, across the square from the Royal Palace);
- The Cacace Chapel and Chapel of Saint Anthony in San Lorenzo Maggiore.
- Altars within churches, such as in Santa Maria la Nova, Santi Severino e Sossio, Santa Maria di Costantinopoli, and the church of San Pietro a Maiella (the site now of the music conservatory).
- Public fountains, including the Fontana del Gigante near Santa Lucia and the Sebeto Fountain at Mergellina.
- Villa Donn'Anna at Posillipo.
- A number of works outside of Naples, including within the Benedictine Abbey of Montecassino and San Nicola in Venice.
