= San Michele Arcangelo, Naples =

Church in Naples, Italy

Coordinates: 40.848300°N 14.249763°E

San Michele Arcangelo or San Michele a Port'Alba is one of four major churches facing Piazza Dante in Naples, Italy. It stands near Port'Alba, a city gate opening to the piazza.

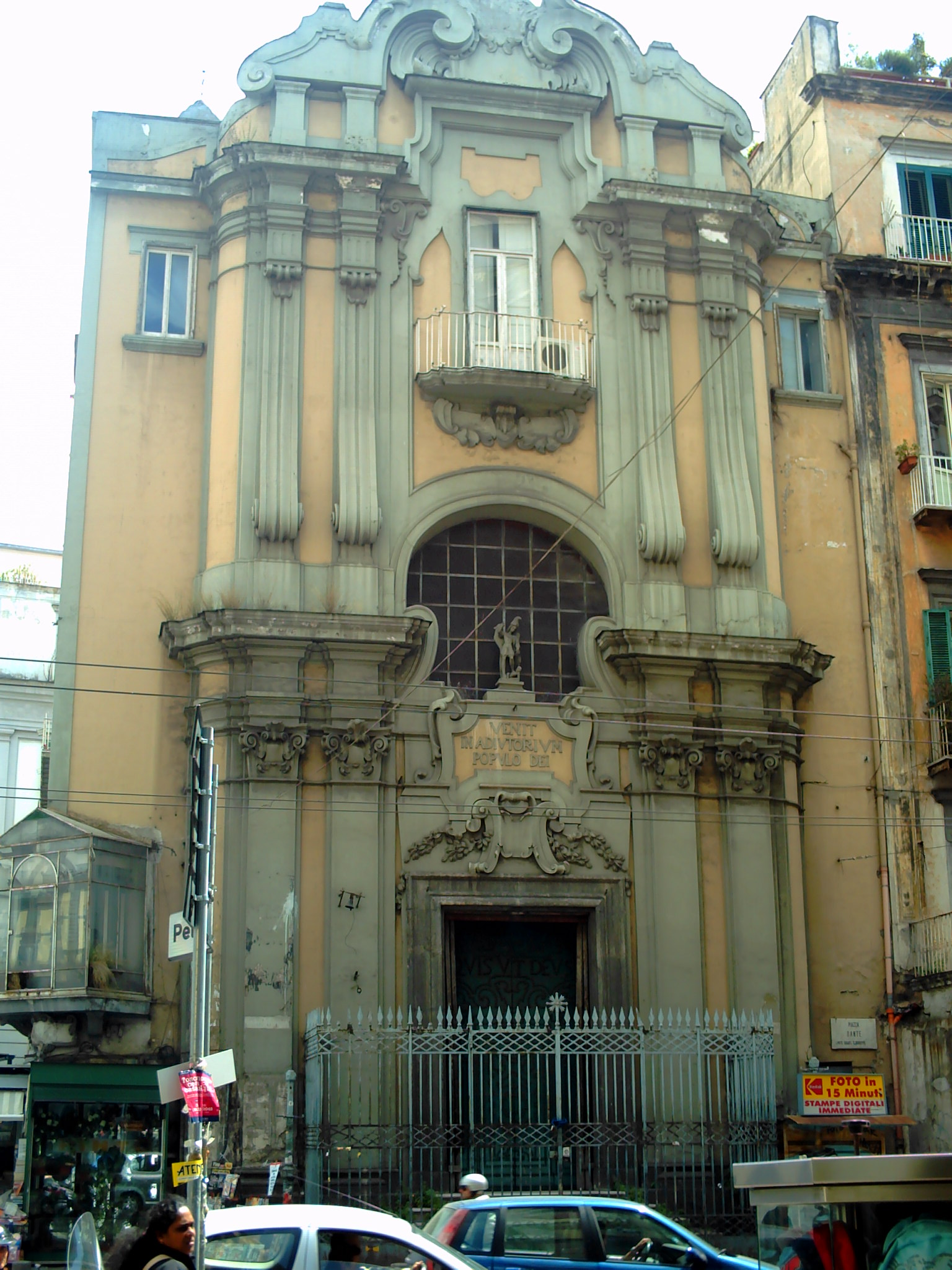
Rococo Facade

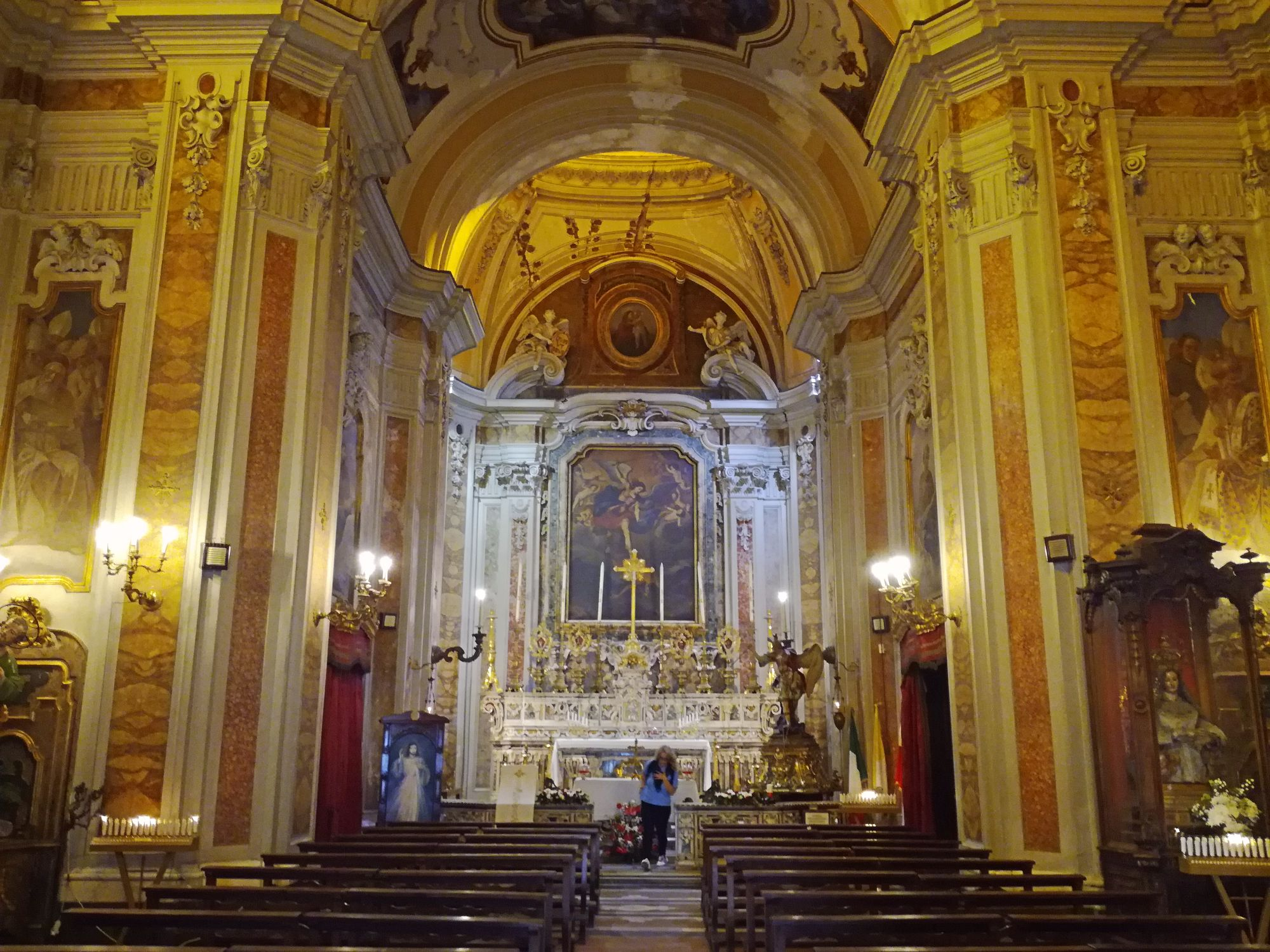
Interior

Construction of the church, originally called Santa Maria della Provvidenza, began around 1620, but it underwent reconstruction in the 18th century by architect Domenico Antonio Vaccaro and expansion by designs of Giuseppe Astarita. The present facade is in Rococo style. The church was reopened in October, 2010.

The interior contains a St Michael by Giuseppe Marullo and a Sant'Irene and Sant'Emidio by Vaccaro, the architect. The 18th century ceiling frescoes were painted by Lucio Stabile. In the sacristy is a marble font (1758) by Nicola Tagliacozzi Canale, and two walnut pews (1772) by Nunzia Tancredi with two oval marble reliefs depicting the Adoration of the Shepherds and Adoration of the Magi.

== Bibliography ==
- Vincenzo Regina, Le chiese di Napoli. Viaggio indimenticabile attraverso la storia artistica, architettonica, letteraria, civile e spirituale della Napoli sacra, Newton e Compton editor, Naples 2004.
