= Avvocata =

Quarter of Naples, Italy

Coordinates: 40°51′13″N 14°14′31″E

- Quarter of Naples
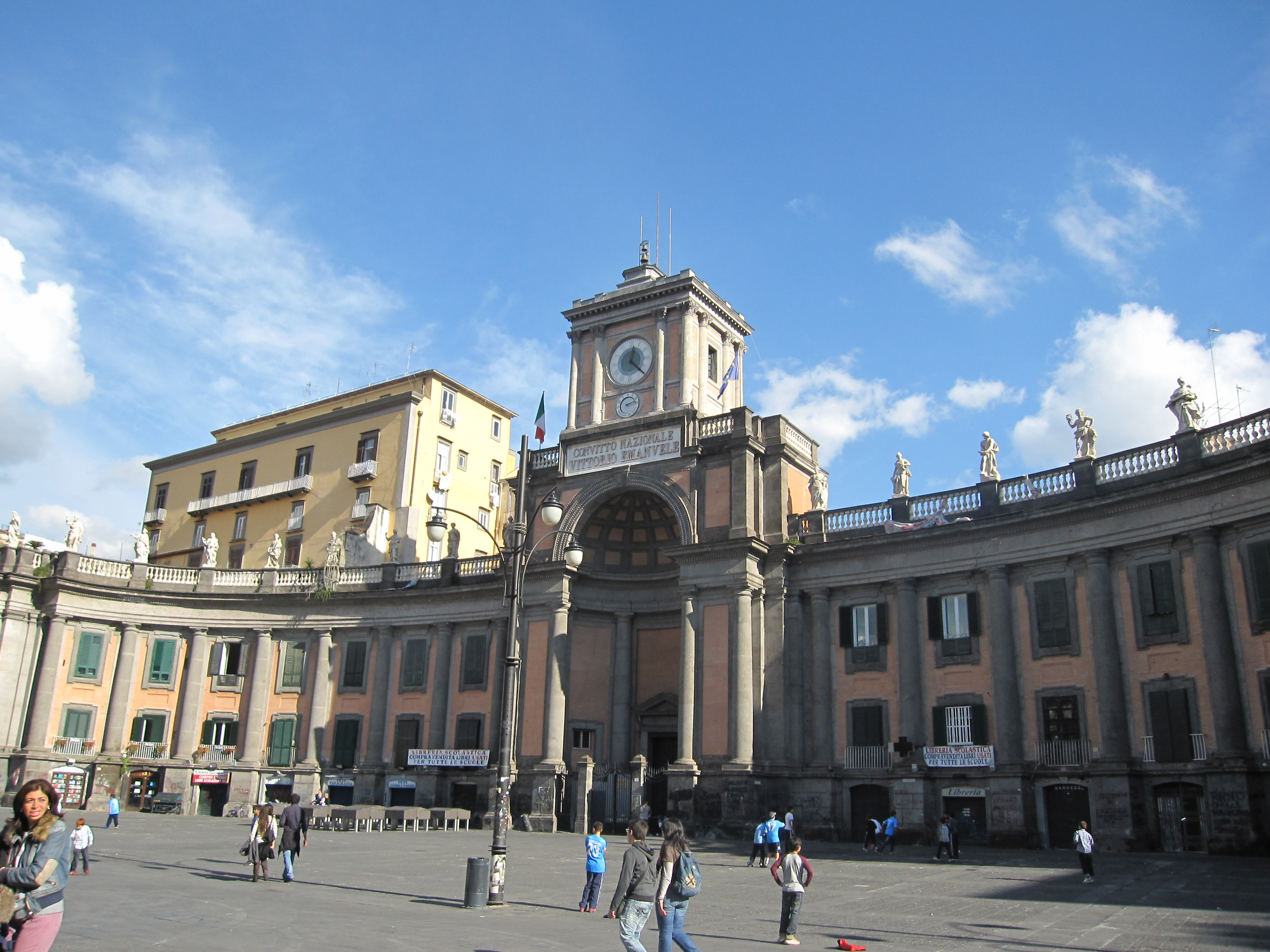
- Piazza Dante in Naples.

- Location of Avvocata within Naples
- Country: Italy
- Region: Campania
- City: Naples
- Municipalità: 2nd

Area
  - Total: 1.22 km^{2} (0.47 sq mi)

Population
  - Total: 33.001
  - Density: 27.0/km^{2} (70.1/sq mi)
- Postal codes: 80135 and 80136

Avvocata (Italian: feminine form of "avvocato", "advocate" in reference to the Madonna as the advocate of humanity) is a quarter of Naples, southern Italy. It is just outside, to the west, of the original historic centre of the Greco-Roman city of Naples. It is the first area beyond the original city developed under the Spanish viceroyship when the Spanish moved into the Kingdom of Naples in the mid-16th century. The most prominent landmark in the area is the large square, Piazza Dante.
