= Palace of the Immacolatella, Naples =

Baroque style palace at water's edge in Naples, Italy

Coordinates: 40.841426°N 14.259103°E

The Palace of the Immacolatella is a late Baroque style palace at water's edge in Naples, Italy.

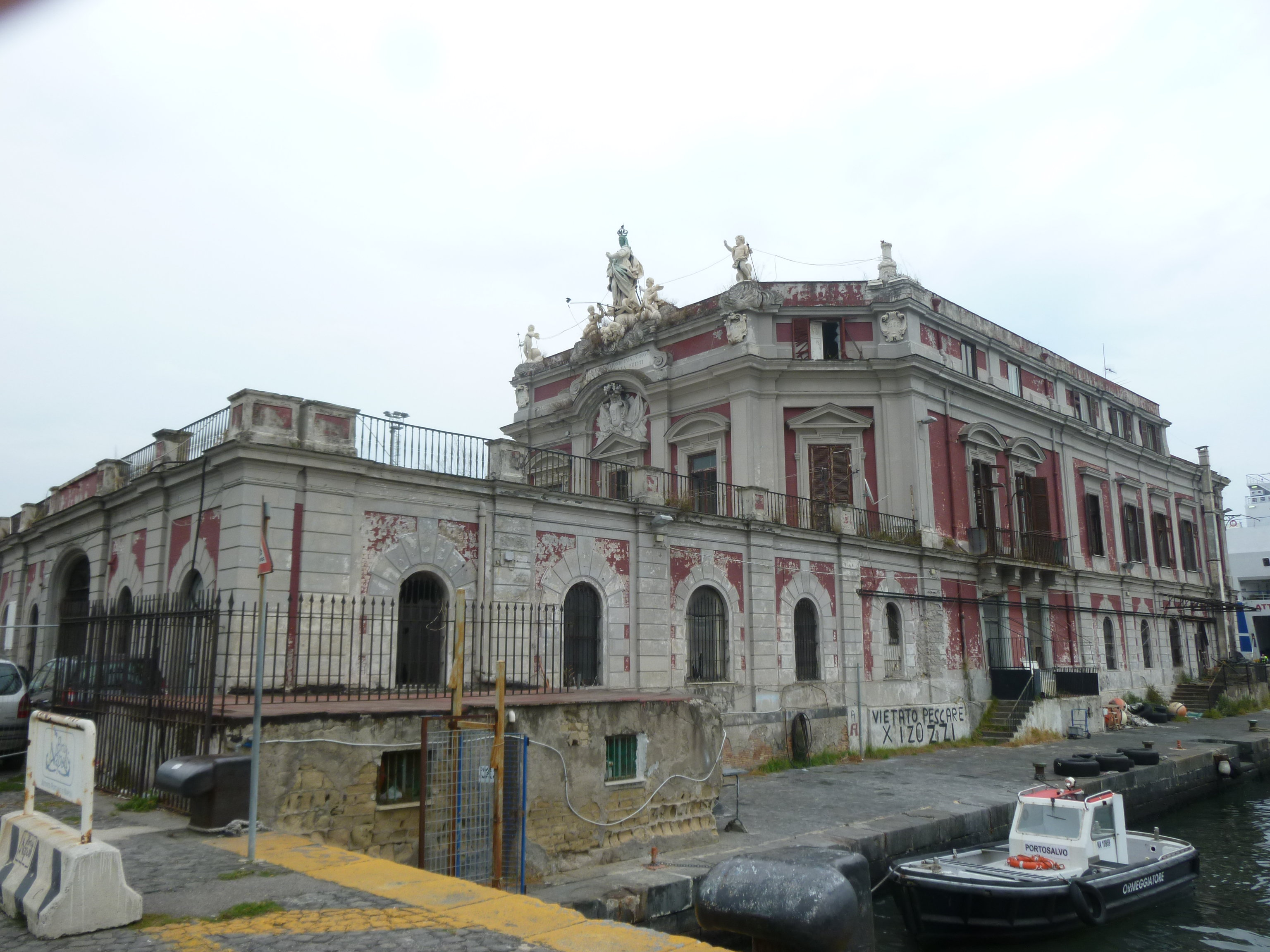
The Immacolatella

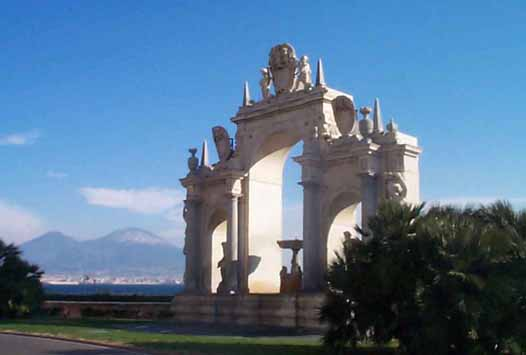
Immacolatella Fountain, now in Castel dell' Ovo

The palace design is attributed to the multifaceted painter, sculptor, and architect, Domenico Antonio Vaccaro and it was completed in 1740s to the quarantine station for the port of Naples. At the time, it stood on a peninsula connected to the mainland, connected through the church of Santa Maria del Portosalvo (Holy Mary of the Safe Haven). The area to the north was filled in the 1930s

The palace is so named because of the statue of the Immaculate Conception by Francesco Pagano, which stands on the roof line over the entrance. The famous Immacolatella fountain, now called Fountain of the Giant (or of Immacolatella), was initially associated with the building, and designed by Michelangelo Naccherino. It was relocated and now stands on the seaside road, via Nazario Sauro, near the Castel dell'Ovo.
