= Fontana del Gigante =

17th-century fountain monument in Naples

Coordinates: 40.829670°N 14.250081°E

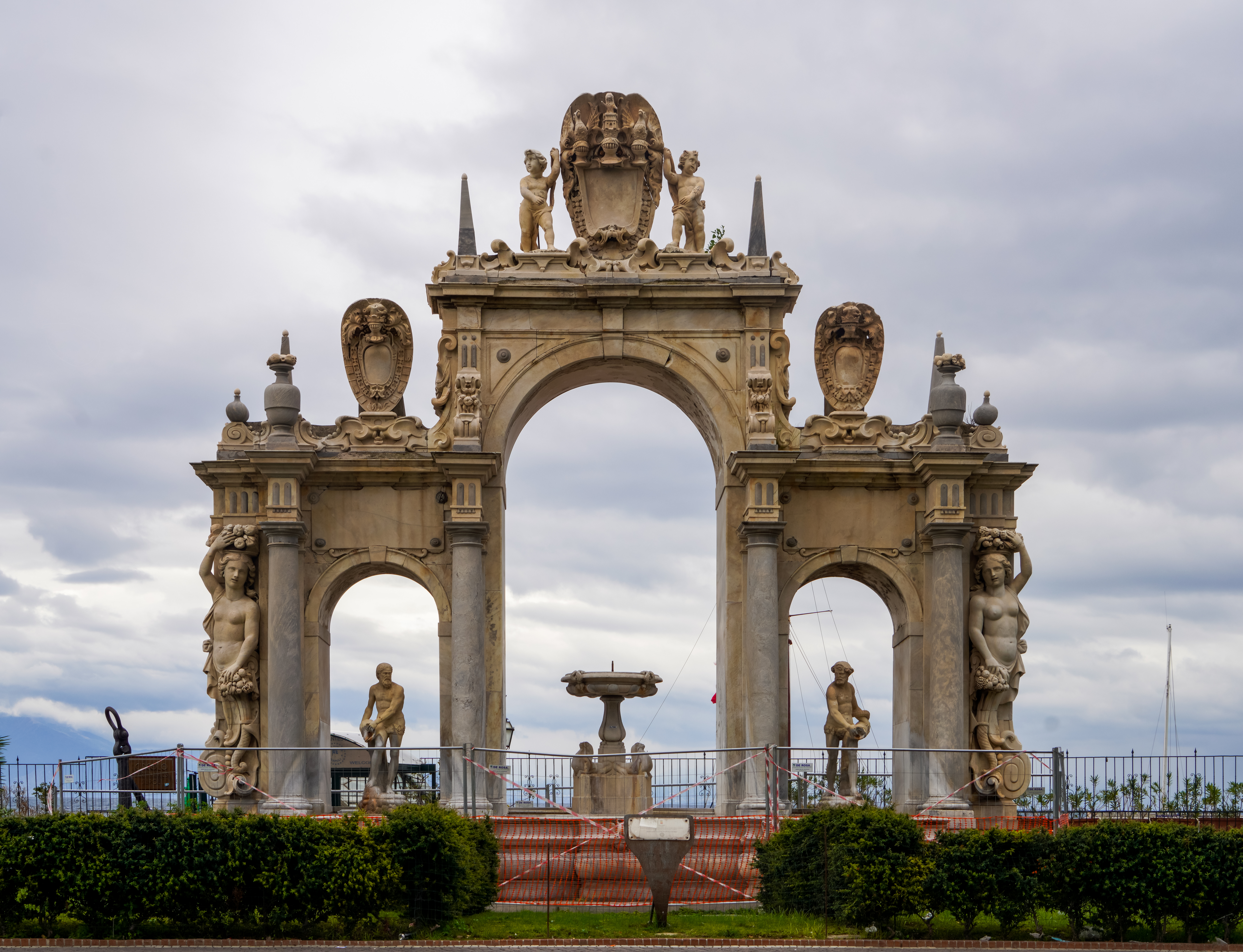
Fountain

The Fontana del Gigante (or Fountain of the Giant), also called the Fontana dell'Immacolatella, is a 17th-century fountain monument in Naples.

It was originally built adjacent to the Royal Palace of Naples, where it stood near a colossal ancient statue, and thereby gained its name. From there it was moved to the site of Palace of the Immacolatella, but in 1905, it was moved to it present picturesque site, on Via Partenope, near the Castel dell'Ovo.

== History ==
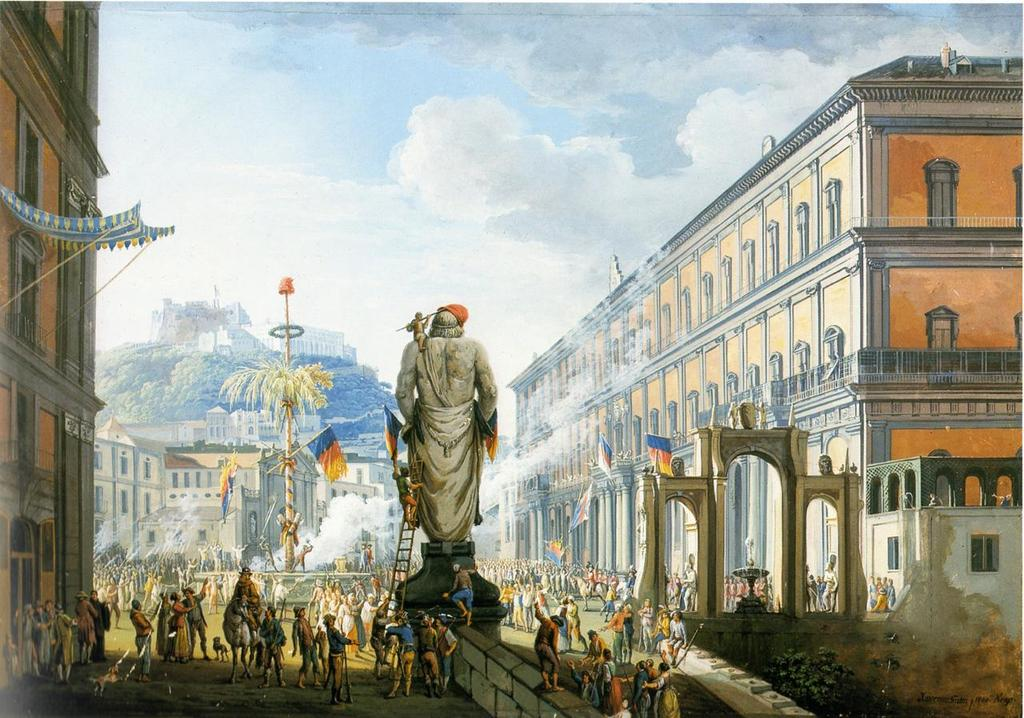
1799 View of the Largo di Palazzo with statue and fountain

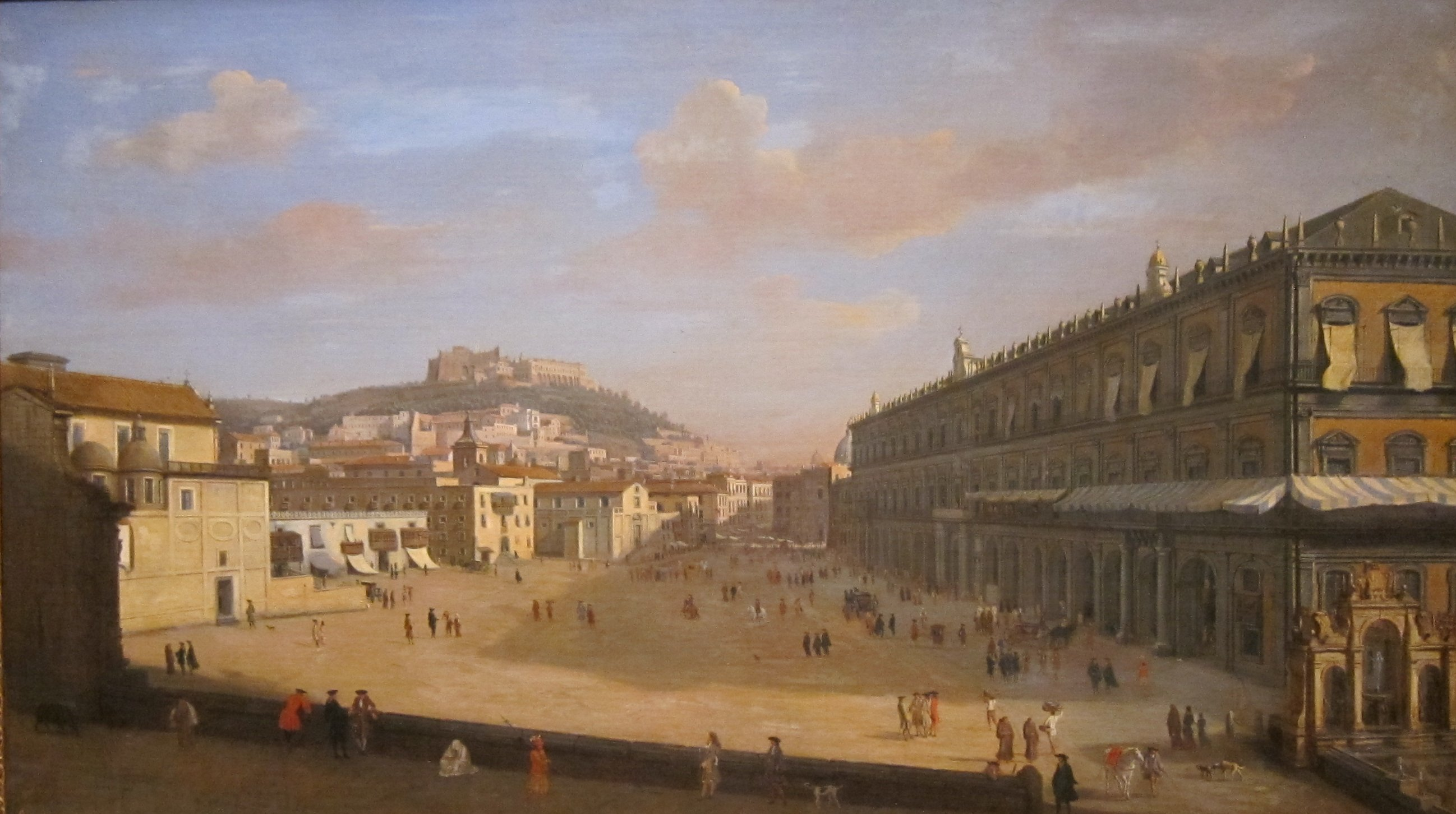
Vanvitelli's 1706 depiction of Largo di Palazzo. The fountain is seen on right lower corner, but it does not show the colossal statue.

The fountain was commissioned by the Spanish viceroy, Antonio Álvarez de Toledo, 5th Duke of Alba, and erected alongside the royal palace at the edge of the Largo di Palazzo (currently known as Piazza del Plebiscito), at a corner (currently the start of Via Cesario Console) where a colossal statue, known as il Gigante or Giant, had been erected. The statue coupled with the fountain can be seen in this location in some paintings from past centuries, including one by Gaspar van Wittel preserved in the public art gallery of the Palazzo Zevallos Stigliano on Via Toledo. The statue of the Giant had been assembled in 1670 after a colossal bust, putatively depicting Jupiter Stator, was found in Cumae, to which the other parts were added. The statue was removed in 1807. The fountain was designed by the Florentine artists, Pietro Bernini and Michelangelo Naccherino.

The fountain was removed in 1815 from its original location during the works to refurbish the statue of the Giant. The stones remained in storage until 1882, when the fountain was reassembled sans Giant statue at a small pier, near the Palazzo dell'Immacolatella, which led to the fountain's other name as of the Immacolatella. The bust of Jupiter Stator is now on display in the Naples archeological museum.

Four years later in 1886, the fountain was again disassembled, and moved in 1889 to a site on the grounds of the Villa del Popolo. The new location was considered unfortunate, in part because the area was now surrounded by unscenic port warehouses. By 1904 a letter to a Neapolitan magazine complained the state of deterioration of the fountain and had proposed to place it in newly arising district of Villa Santa Lucia, that was about to be built at that time. In 1905-1906, it was moved again, to a spot where Via Partenope widens, where Via Nazario begins.

== Description ==
The richly decorated, Mannerist ensemble of the monumental fountain is articulated through three round arches, above which are placed the heraldic symbols of the Viceroy of Naples and his king. In the central arch there is the cup which is supported by two marine animals, while the statues in the remaining two lateral arches represent river divinities holding two monsters of the sea in their hands. Two caryatid statues holding cornucopias are placed at the end of the last arches.

Manfredo Manfredi was inspired by this fountain for the creation of the arch of the Carosello, which from 1963 appeared in the opening of the famous advertising program broadcast on RAI between 1957 and 1977.

== Sources ==
- Manuale di napoletanità. 365 lezioni semiserie su Napoli e la napoletanità, Amedeo Colella, Page 51.
