= Domenico Antonio Vaccaro =

Italian painter

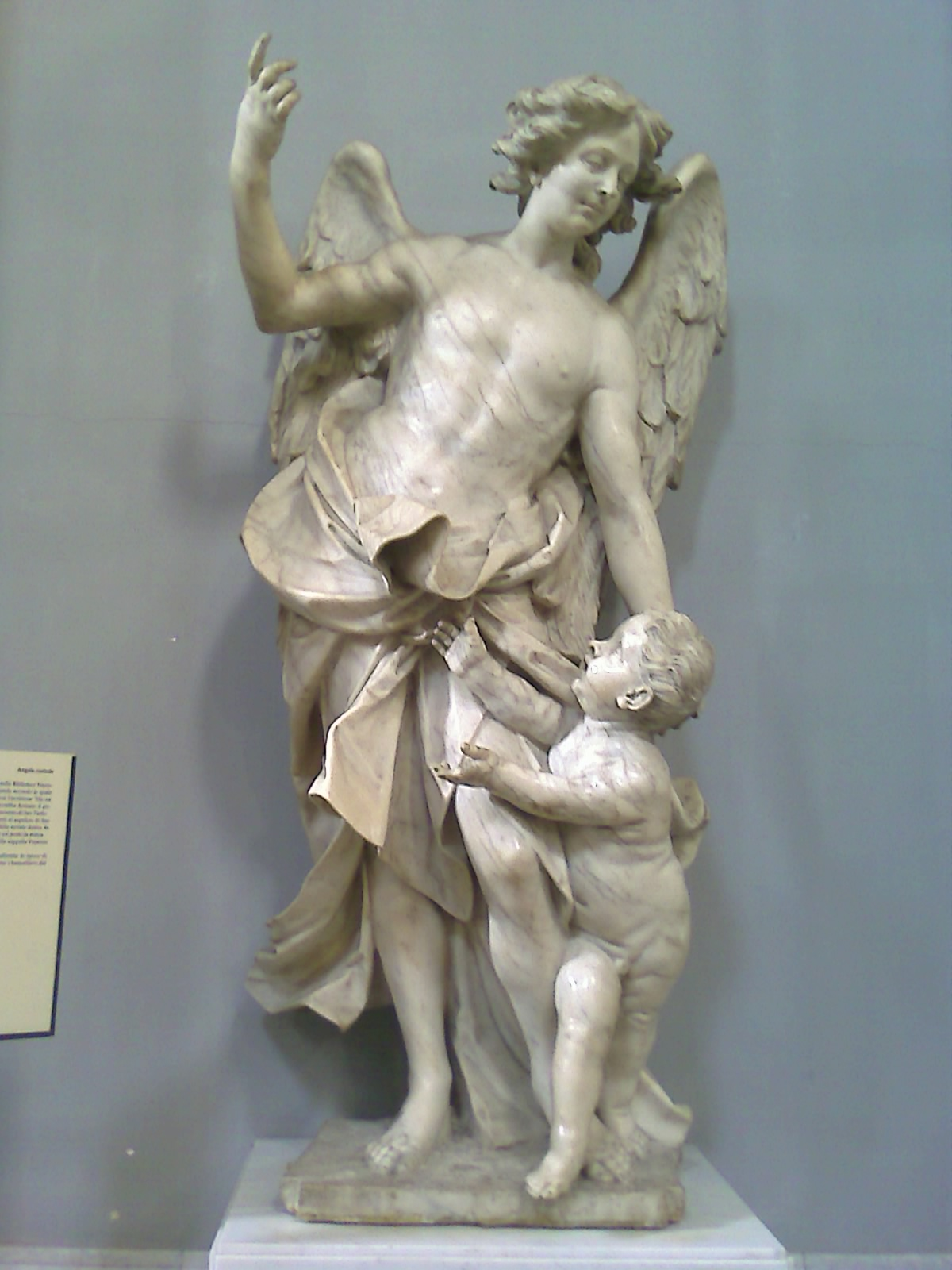
- Guardian Angel in San Paolo Maggiore
- Born: 3 June 1678; Naples, Kingdom of Naples
- Died: 13 June 1745 (aged 67); Naples, Kingdom of Naples
- Education: Lorenzo Vaccaro; Francesco Solimena
- Known for: Painting, Sculpture, Architecture
- Movement: Baroque; Rococo

Domenico Antonio Vaccaro (June 3, 1678 – June 13, 1745) was an Italian painter, sculptor and architect. He created many important sculptural and architectural projects in Naples. His later works are executed in an individualistic Rococo style.

== Life ==
=== Painting ===
Domenico Antonio Vaccaro was born in Naples as the son of Lorenzo Vaccaro. His father Lorenzo was a pupil of Cosimo Fanzago. Domenico Antonio Vaccaro first studied under his father. He subsequently trained in the workshop of Francesco Solimena. Among his earliest surviving paintings, executed during the 1690s, are the Penitent St. William of Aquitaine (Naples, Santa Maria della Verità), a work of complex composition, charged colours and dramatic chiaroscuro inspired by Mattia Preti’s work, and a bozzetto (Naples, National Museum of San Martino) for the proposed vault decoration of the sacristy of San Domenico Maggiore.

Bernardo de' Dominici suggested that it was Domenico’s failure to secure the San Domenico commission, which went to Solimena, that dissuaded him from pursuing a career as a painter. Certainly, from around 1707 he appears to have practised almost exclusively as a sculptor and architect, until during the 1730s he resumed painting, executing large works in an individualistic Rococo style for the Collegiata at Marigliano, the Monteverginella in Naples, and for many other Neapolitan churches.

=== Sculpture ===
Domenico’s earliest sculptures were made in collaboration with his father, whom he helped to complete the bronze equestrian monument to Philip V of Spain for the Piazza del Gesù in Naples (1702–5). In 1707 he carved the marble antependium, the Dead Christ with Angels, for the high altar of San Giacomo degli Spagnoli. After Lorenzo’s death Domenico completed his unfinished figures of Providence and Divine Grace (1708) for the Cappella di San Giovanni Battista in the church of the Certosa di San Martino. He continued his family’s involvement in the major redecoration programme at the Certosa for another 13 years. He provided figures of Solitude (1707) and Penitence (1708) for the Cappella di San Bruno and monumental half-length busts of St. Januarius and St. Martin (1709) for the Chiostro Grande.

In 1709–19 he made four reliefs of the Four Evangelists and the imposing high altar relief of the Trinity and the Virgin Consigning the Keys of the City of Naples to St. Januarius for the Cappella di San Gennaro, and his colourful stucco and marble decoration of the Cappella di San Giuseppe (1718–19) is one of the most important early 18th-century decorative ensembles in Naples. Domenico’s contemporary Cappella del Rosario, with graceful white stucco garland-bearing angels balanced on the architraves and putti and cherubs flitting over the walls, is characteristic of his light-hearted barocchetto architectural decoration.

From 1719–24 he was occupied on the decoration of the crypt of San Paolo Maggiore, carving four atmospheric marble reliefs of the Life of St. Cajetan. For the same church he executed one of his most appealing works, the tender and naturalistic marble group of the Guardian Angel (1724), in which the influence of Solimena’s painterly style is especially evident. Domenico’s carved obelisk and its bronze statue of St. Dominic in the Piazza San Domenico, Naples, date from 1737.

In addition to his religious commissions, Domenico Vaccaro also produced portrait busts for funerary monuments, among them those of Vincenzo Petra and his brother Domenico Petra (marble, 1701) for their chapel in San Pietro a Majella, and that of Anna Maria Caterina Doria (marble, 1730), in the same church. Like his father, he provided models for silversmiths, such as that for the monumental silver statue of the Virgin Immaculate, finished by 1724 for the high altar of the church of the Gesù Nuovo. He also made crib figures (e.g. Naples, National Museum of San Martino; Munich, Bavarian National Museum).

=== Architecture ===
Domenico Vaccaro was among those artists who introduced the light-hearted barocchetto style of architectural decoration to Naples. At Santa Maria delle Grazie, Calvizzano, near Naples, he added transepts and a choir to an earlier church. His extensive use of white stucco rather than coloured decoration for the interior accentuates the impression of height, and is so applied as apparently to abolish the conventional architectonic elements.

In the centralized church of Santa Maria della Concezione a Montecalvario in Naples (1718–24), Domenico supervised the design and execution of the decoration, carved the sculpture and provided the painted altarpiece. Again all superfluous decoration is eliminated, and large windows in the elongated central octagon accentuate the brilliant light created by the white stucco decoration, whose forms are inspired by Cosimo Fanzago’s.

The towers and concave profiles of Domenico’s church façades are related to those of Francesco Borromini. His most engaging architectural device, however, was his use of maiolica tiles in the redecoration of the Chiostro delle Clarisse (1739–42) at Santa Chiara, Naples. The coloured narrative tiles that clad the piers and benches dividing the original Gothic garden lend a bucolic note to this city cloister.

Domenico also designed the church of San Giovanni at Capua, and he reconstructed the Cathedral of Bari. He helped reconstruct the church of Santa Maria della Pace, damaged after an earthquake.

Domenico’s most ambitious secular architectural commission was the Palazzo Tarsia in Naples (1732–9). This magnificent palace, conceived on a larger scale than any hitherto in the city, was never completed and its elaborate terraces, ramps and gardens were destroyed in the 19th century. Its design perhaps owed something to Johann Lukas von Hildebrandt’s plans for the Belvedere, Vienna. Domenico also designed the Palazzo Caravita at Portici and the Palace of the Immacolatella at the water's edge in central Naples.

== Selected works ==
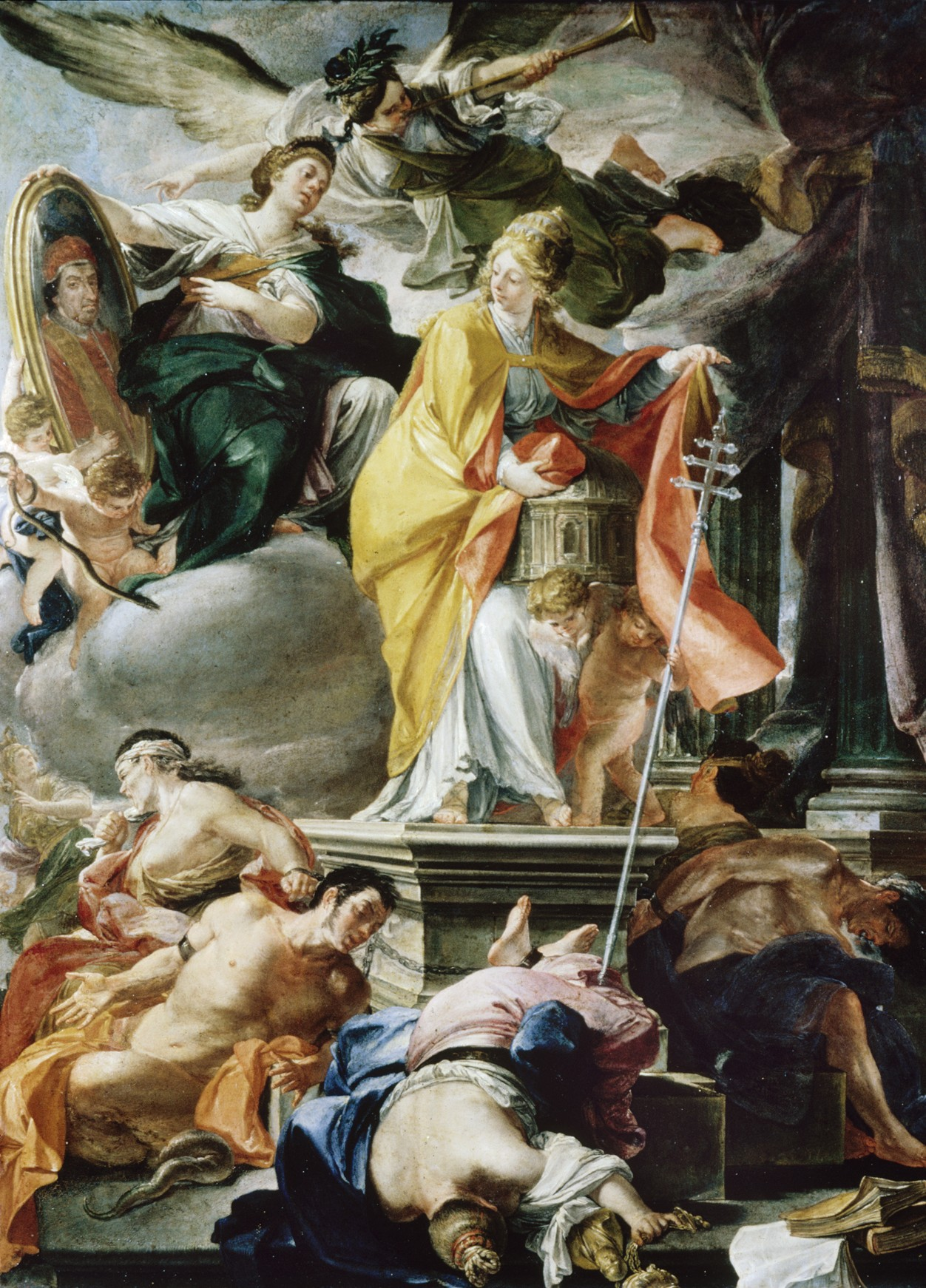
Allegory of the Papacy of Clement XI, c. 1720, Walters Art Museum, Baltimora

=== Paintings ===
- Martyridom of St. Procopius, Belvedere, Vienna
- Allegory of the Papacy of Clement XI, Walters Art Museum, Baltimora
- Madonna and Child with Saints Roch, Sebastian and Francis Xavier, Worcester Art Museum, Worcester, Massachusetts
- God the Father and the Holy Spirit, Mauritshuis, The Hague
- Vision of Saint William of Vercelli, Harvard Art Museums, Cambridge, Massachusetts
- Solomon Worshiping a Pagan God, Detroit Institute of Arts, Detroit

=== Architecture ===
- Church San Michele Arcangelo, Naples
- Church Santa Maria della Concezione a Montecalvario, Naples
- Palace of the Immacolatella, Naples
- Church Santa Maria della Stella, Naples (completion)

=== Sculptures ===
- San Gennaro, Naples Cathedral
- Guardian angel, in San Paolo Maggiore church, Naples
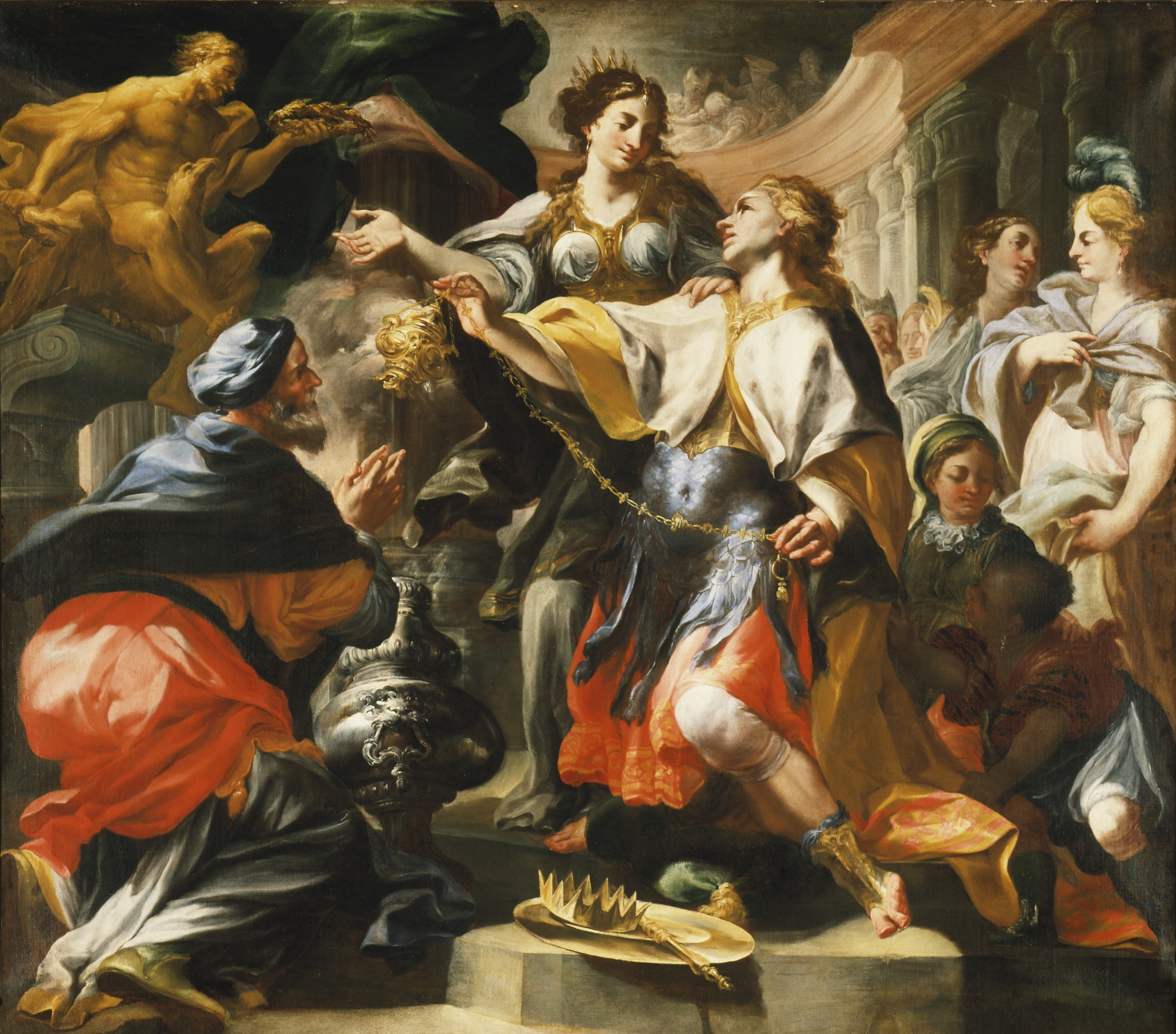
Solomon Worshiping a Pagan God, 1695

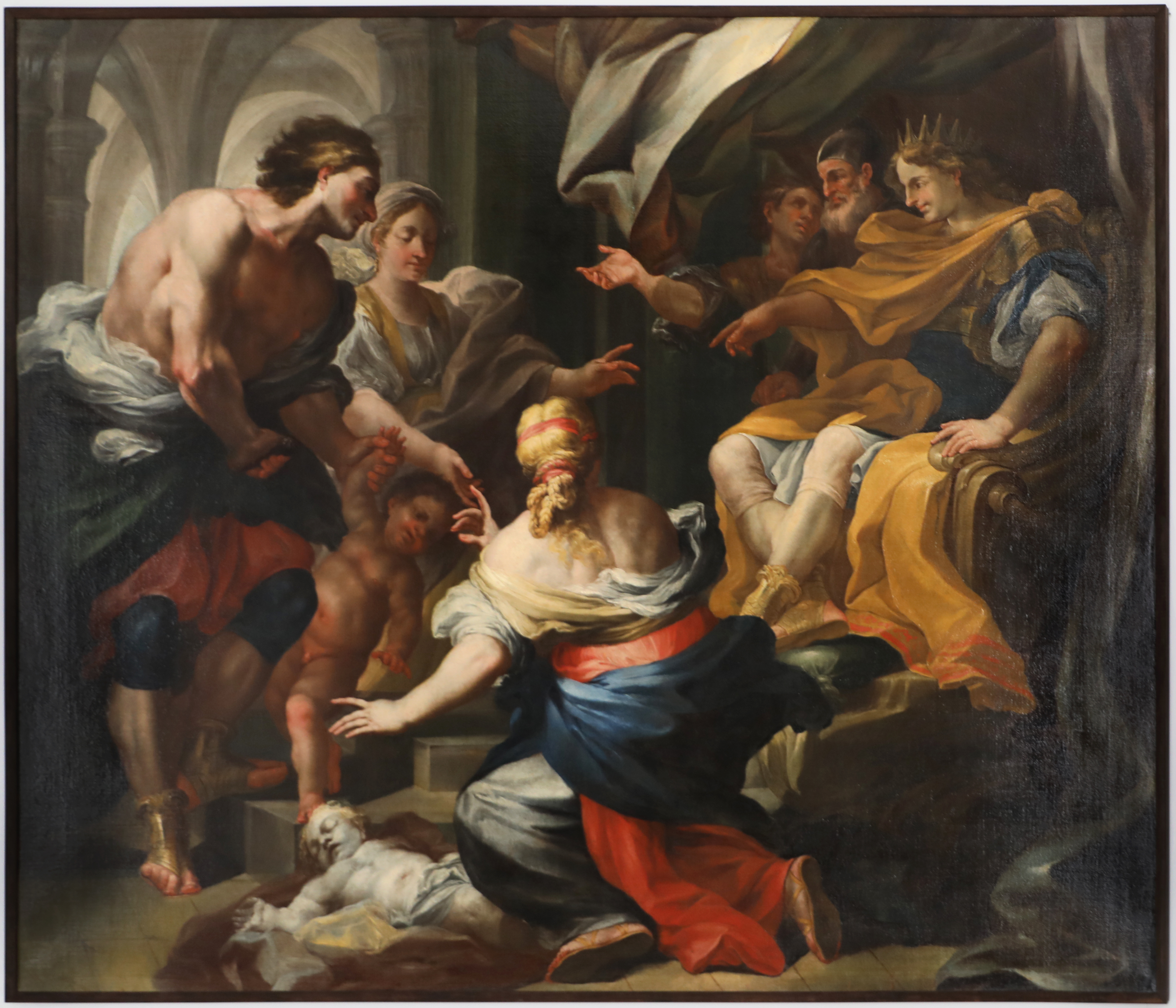
Judgement of Solomon, c. 1690

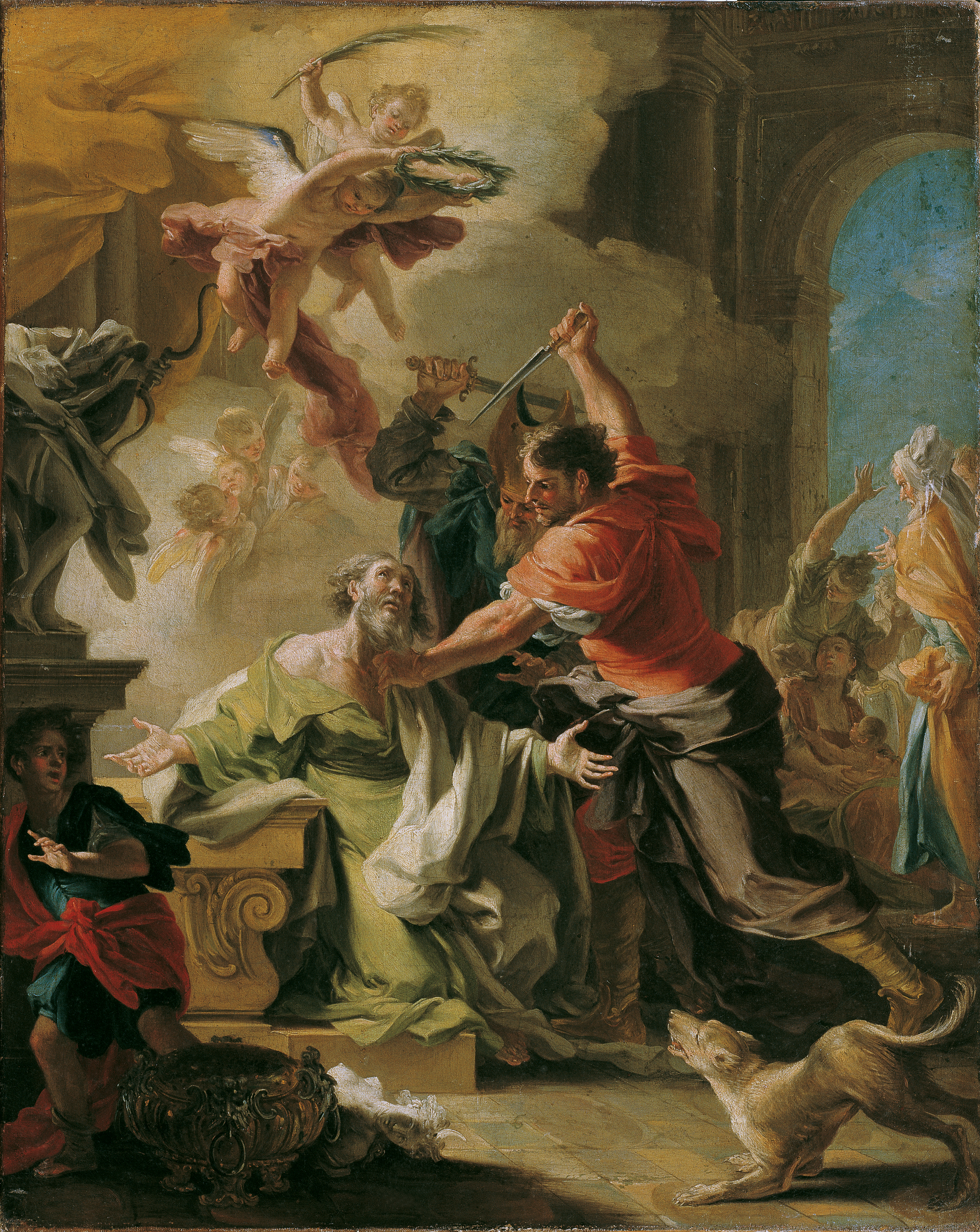
The Martyrdom of St. Procopius, c. 1741

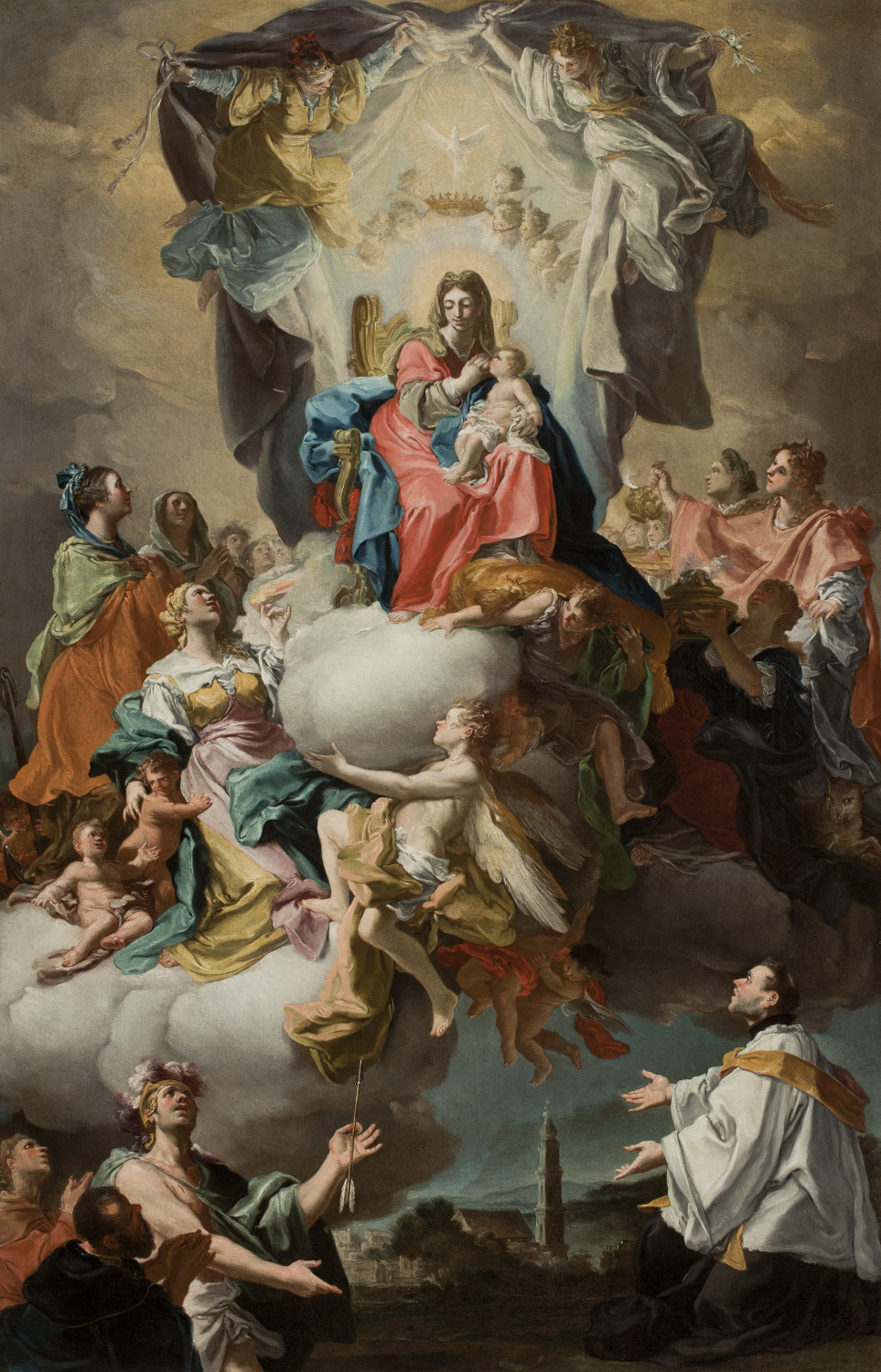
Madonna and Child with Saints Roch, Sebastian and Francis Xavier, c. 1730

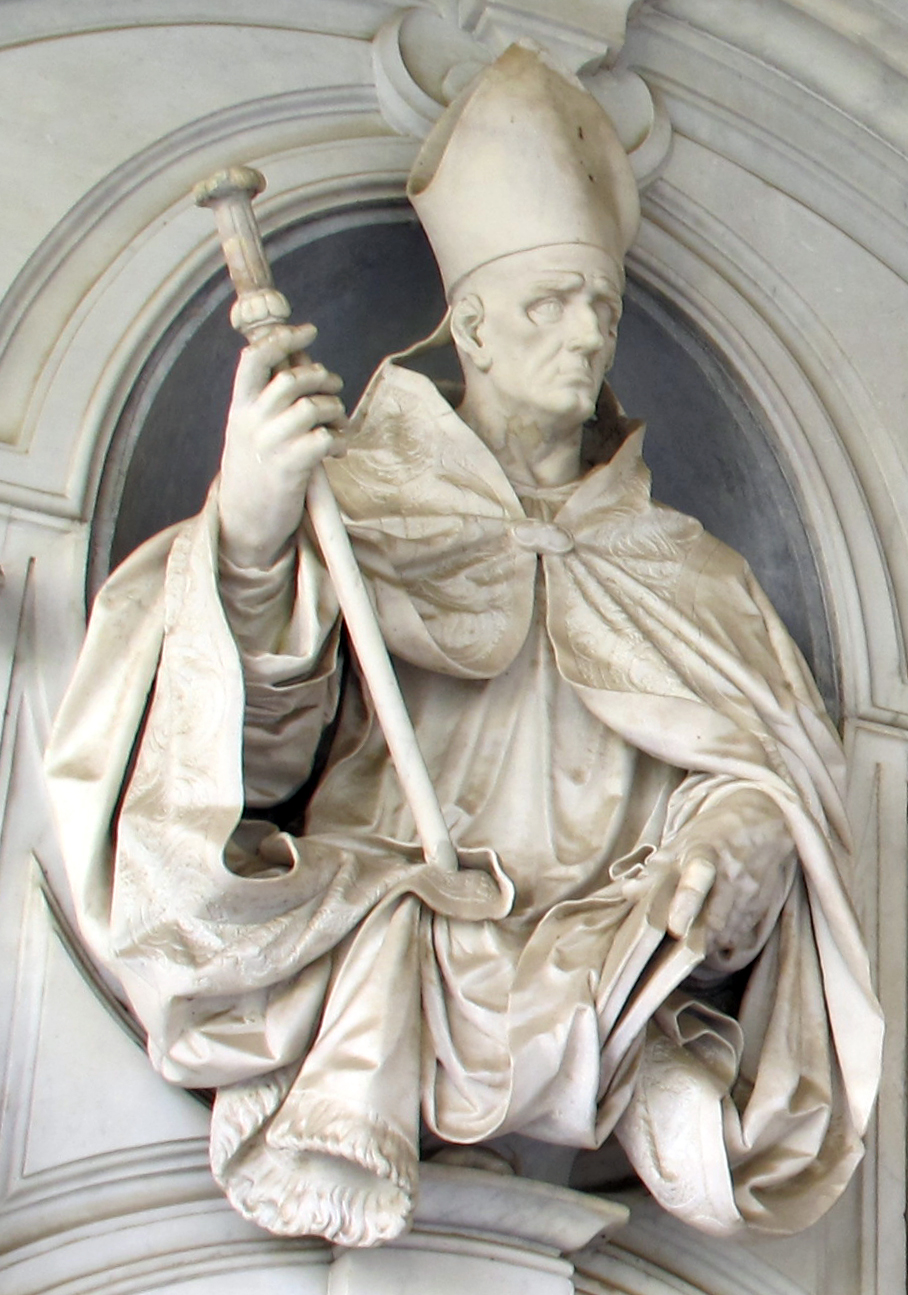
Bust of St. Januarius

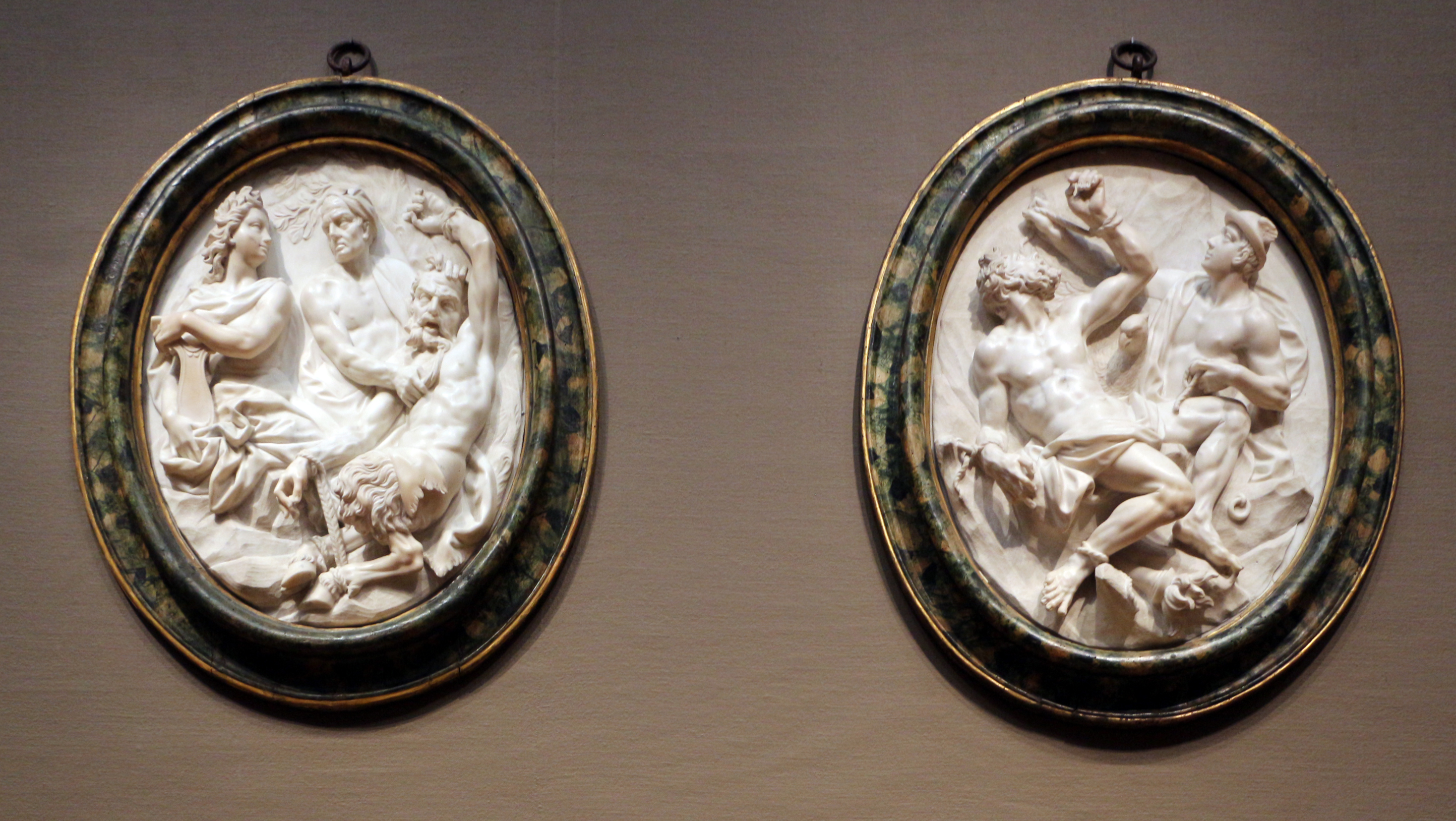
Apollo and Marsyas; Prometheus and Mercury, c. 1720

== Sources ==
- Milizia, Francesco (1826). The lives of celebrated architects, ancient and modern. Vol. I. Translated by Mrs. Edward Cresy. High Holborn, London: J. Taylor Architectural Library. p. 321.
- Gravagnuolo, Benedetto; Adriani, Fiammetta (2005). Domenico Antonio Vaccaro. Sintesi delle Arti. Naples: Guida. ISBN 978-8871888361.
- Rizzo, Vincenzo (2001). Lorenzo e Domenico Antonio Vaccaro. Apoteosi di un binomio. Naples: Altrastampa.
