= Piazza Bellini, Naples =

Plaza located in central Naples, Italy

Coordinates: 40.8496°N 14.2521°E

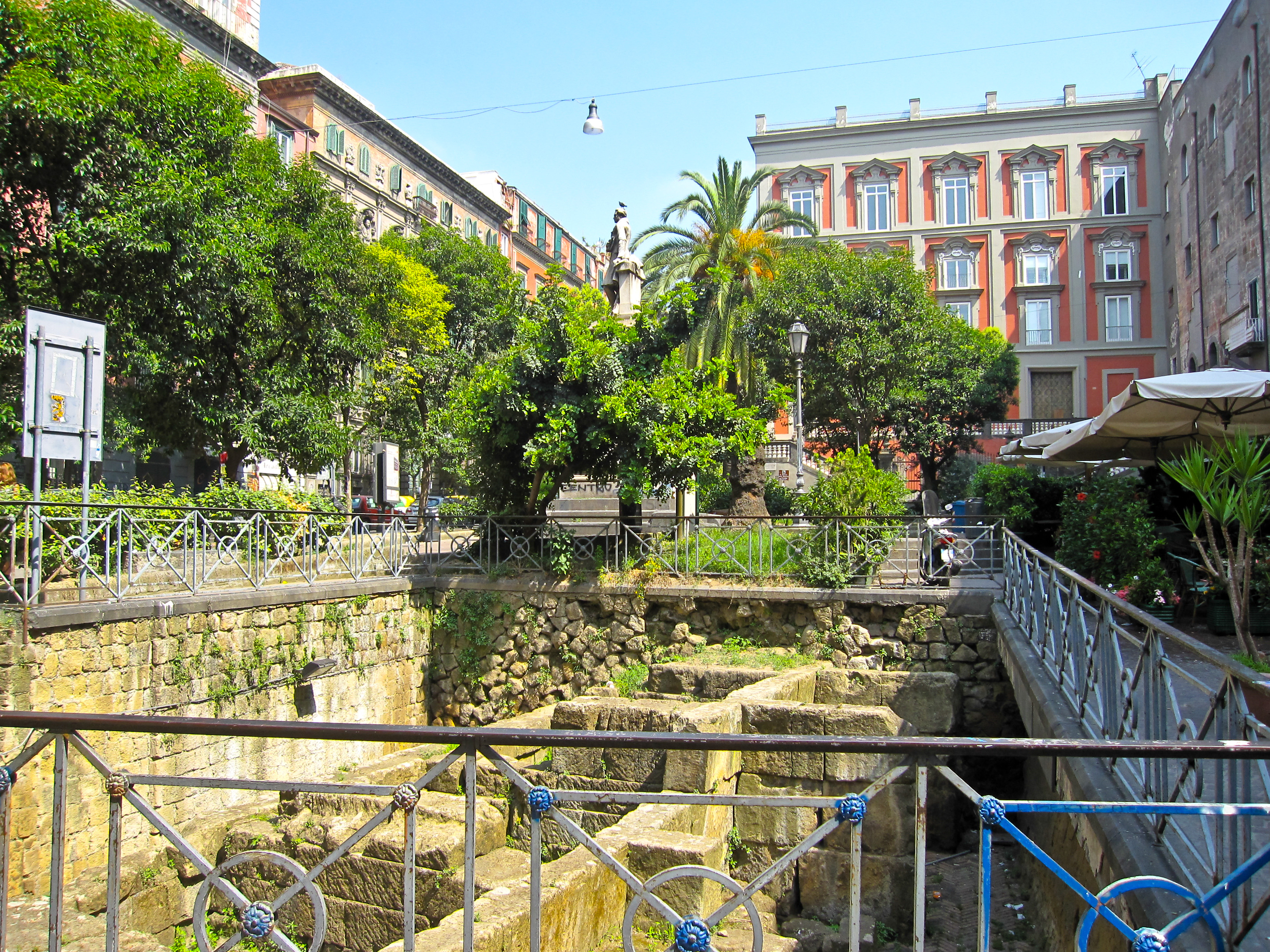
The square

The Piazza Bellini is a plaza located in central Naples, Italy. The Via Santa Maria di Costantinopoli runs along its western side. A block to the south is the Decumanus Maximus (which is also part of Via dei Tribunali).

A piazza at the site was present by the 17th century, and a number of major palaces and buildings were built or now lie around the site, including the palaces of Firrao-Bisingano, Castriota Scanderbeg, and the Principi di Conca. A block north on Via Constantinopoli is the Academy of Fine Arts. The piazza is also flanked to the south by the former Monastery of Sant'Antonio delle Monache at Port'Alba, which now houses the library of the University of Naples Faculty of Letters and Philosophy in the Palazzo dei Principi di Conca.

In 1886, the piazza acquired the statue by Alfonso Bazzico, depicting of the famous composer Vincenzo Bellini, who had been associated with the nearby Music Conservatory of San Pietro a Majella, located just south, on Via dei Tribunali. Initially the composer's statue towered over four female statues representing four heroines of his operas: Norma, Giulietta, Amina, and Elvira but they were detached from the site due to vandalism, and have not returned, or maybe lost. In 1954, and continuing in 1984, the subterranean ruins of the former western walls of the Ancient Greek city of Neapolis were uncovered, and a portion of the ruined walls has been left exposed in a gaping anachronistic canyon that fences what had become a charming modern piazza of cafes and for ambulation.
