= Santa Maria della Concezione a Montecalvario =

Church in Naples, Italy

Coordinates: 40.842816°N 14.246101°E

Santa Maria della Concezione a Montecalvario is a church in central Naples, Italy. Founded as a small church in 1579, it was attached to the adjacent monastery and school of the Concezione. It is located on via Concezione a Montecalvario #32.

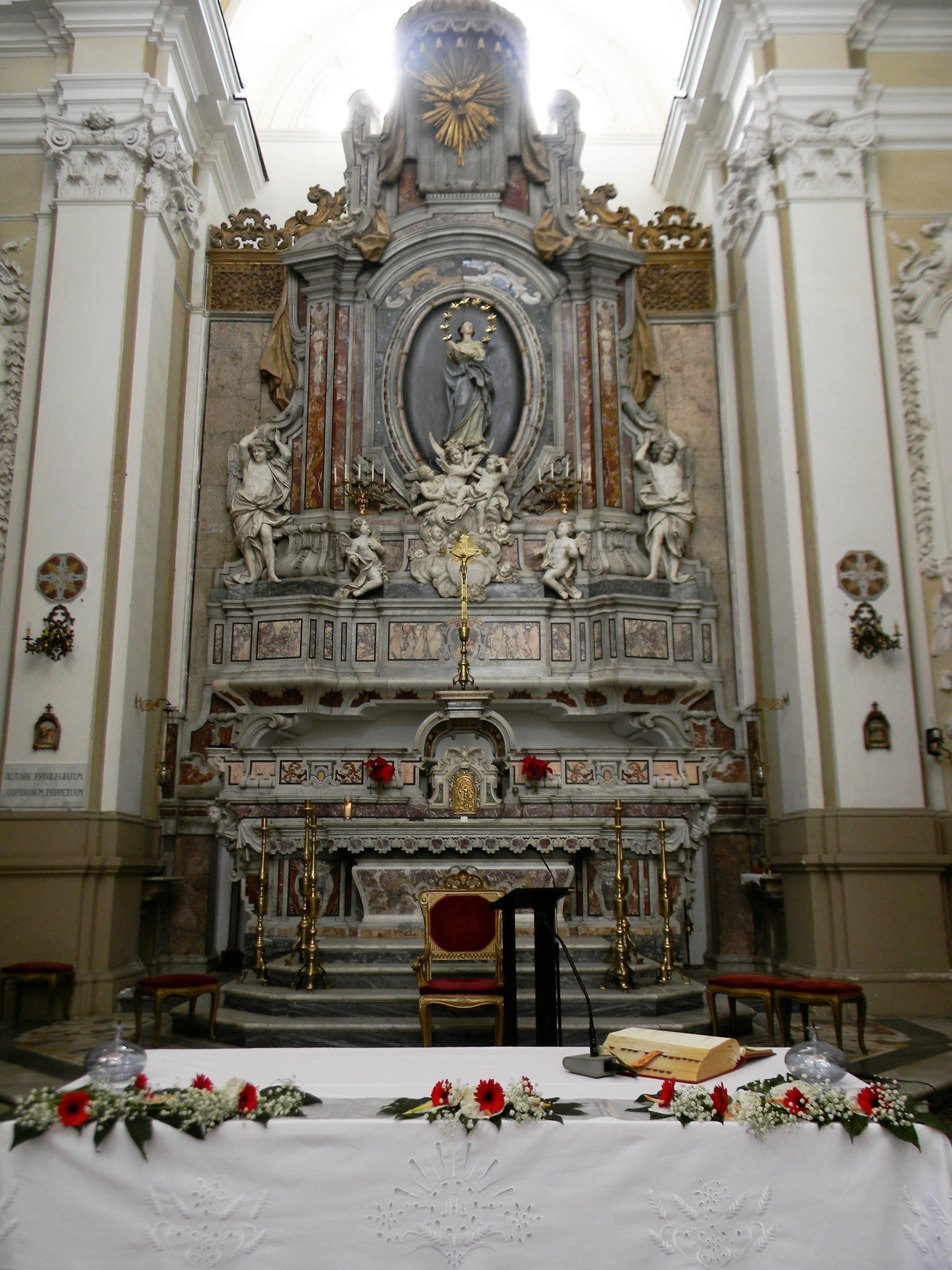
The main altar

From 1718 to 1725, Domenico Antonio Vaccaro with the collaboration of the engineers Giuseppe Lucchese Prezzolini and Filippo Marinelli, reconstructed the church. Its decoration dates to 1724. In 1889 the complex was closed due to structural instability. By the end of the 19th century it had come to the jurisdiction of the Collegi Riuniti, and in 1916, it was granted in perpetuity to the Archiconfraternity of the Santissimo Corpo di Cristo, while the college and garden were given to the Commune of Naples. In 1928, the college was demolished and a school built.

In 1960 a maternity institute was built in the grounds of the garden. In 1978, further restorations were carried out under Loreto Colombo, yet the church was again damaged by the 1980 Irpinia earthquake, and work continued till 1987.

The interior has a Greek cross plan. The cupola is decorated by stuccoes by Giuseppe Cristiano. The main altar and the majolica pavement wes designed by Vaccaro. It is flanked by the heraldic symbols of the Mercurio family. The 16th century statue depicts the Immaculate Conception. The chapels have paintings by Vaccaro, Tommaso Martini, and Nicola Maria Rossi. The Vaccaro brothers also completed the majolica pavement.

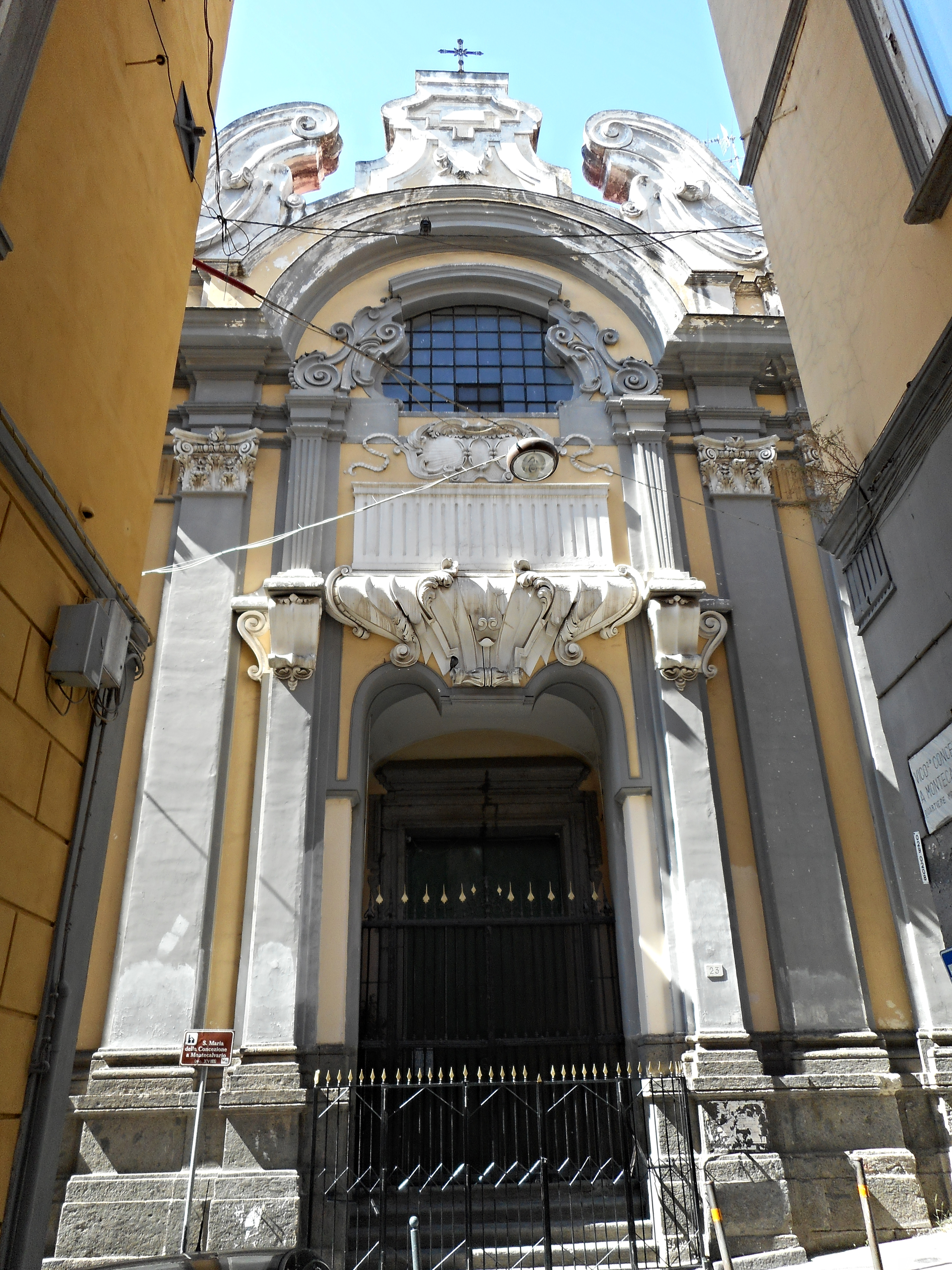
Façade.

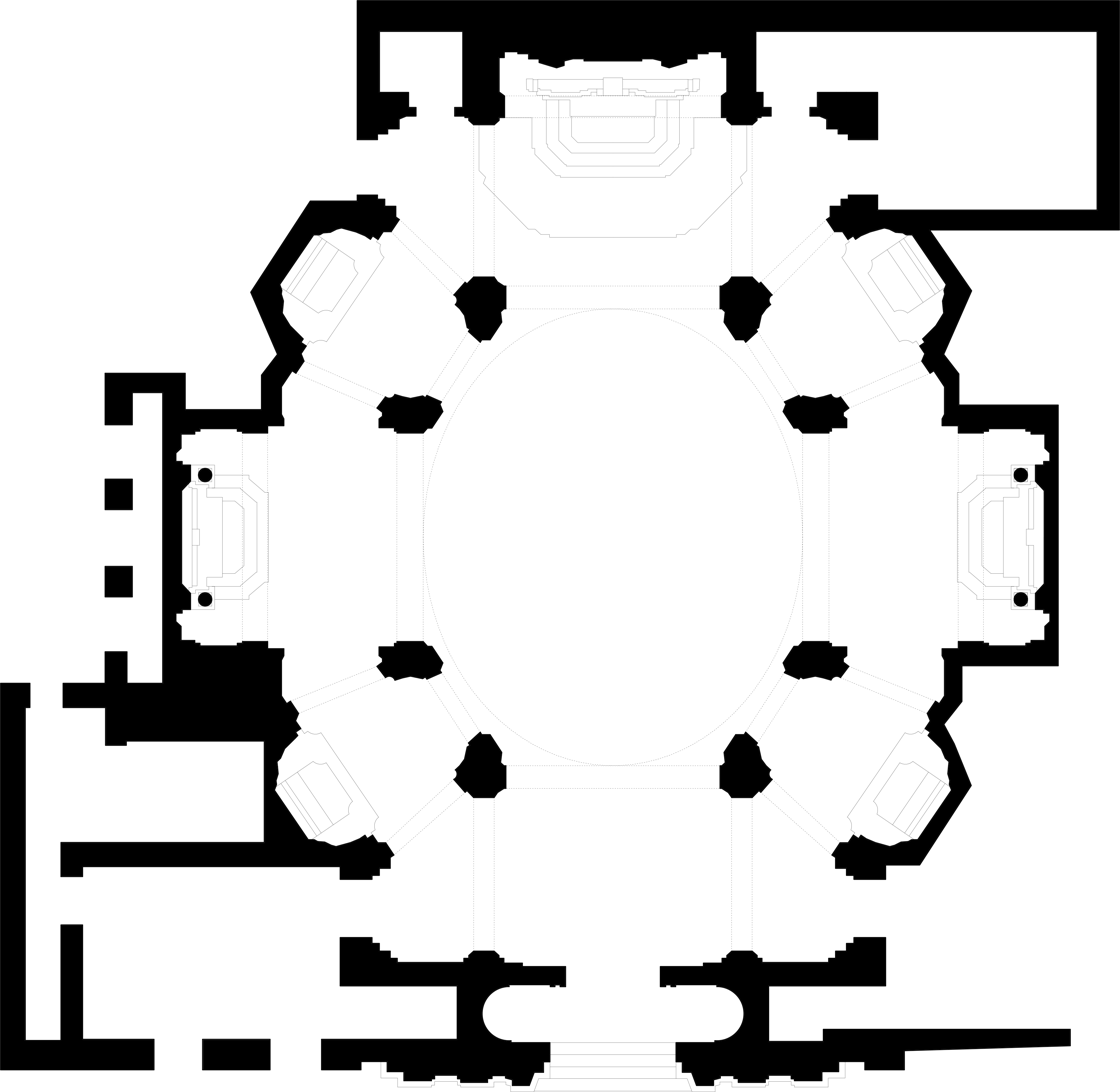
The plan

== Bibliography ==
- Napoli e dintorni, Touring club italiano, Touring Editore, 2001.
- AA.VV. Napoli: Montecalvario questione aperta, Clean edizioni, Naples, Italy
