= Palazzo Firrao, Naples =

Palace in Naples, Italy

Coordinates: 40.8502°N 14.2517°E

The Palazzo Firrao or Palazzo Bisignano, once called Palazzo di Santa Agata, is a monumental palace located on Via Santa Maria di Costantinopoli number 98, facing Piazza Bellini, in central Naples, Italy.

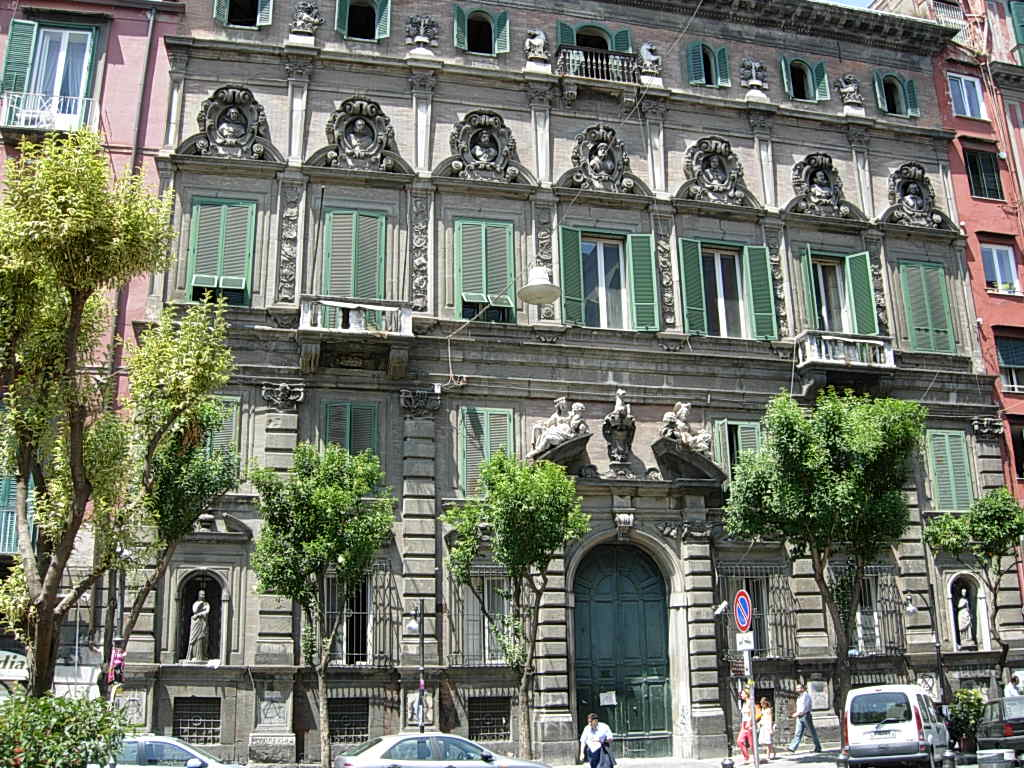
Facade of Palazzo Firrao.

== History ==
A palace at the site existed by the early 1500s, since it is known it once sported external frescoes by Polidoro di Caravaggio. The palace was purchased in the early 17th century by Cesare Firrao, Prince of Sant’Agata and Luzzi, in Calabria. It is generally held that he commissioned the Baroque architect Cosimo Fanzago to rebuild the palace, and that this architect designed the present facade. Others attribute much of the work to Jacopo Lazzari and his son Dionisio. The palace facade was apparently completed by 1630-1640s.

The close affiliation of Firrao to the viceroy's government almost led to the destruction of the palace during the 1647 revolution of Masaniello, but thanks to the intervention of Cardinal Ascanio Filomarino, the palace was spared. Tradition holds that the cardinal was able to dissuade the mobs by pointing to the bust of Charles I of Spain, Holy Roman Emperor, on the facade, and invoking that king's restrained taxation.

The male family of Firrao died out by the second half of the 17th century, and the palace passed through a daughter Livia Firrao, to the line of her husband Tommaso di Sanseverino, Prince of Bisignano. In modern times, it housed government offices.

== Architecture ==
The base floors of the facade are constructed with rusticated piperno rock, carved with sturdy but tall Ionic pilasters. The ground floor windows are topped with interrupted pediments with decorative urns. The superior tympanum of the portal is flanked by two reclining statues, each with cornucopiae, depicting Magnanimity (with lion) and Charity (with eagle). In the center, below a forward prancing horse, is a shield displaying the heraldic symbols of the Firrao family.

The superior floors also are rich in sculptural elements, with two stories of carved pilasters, the topmost of which are surmounted by symbols of the Firrao family: grapes, lions, and raring horses. But the striking element are the seven medallion niches containing marble busts of rulers of Naples, mostly from the House of Habsburg, which Firrao served. Sculpted by Giulio Mencaglia, perhaps with help from Bernardino Landini and Giuliano Finelli from left to right (not in chronologic order) they depict: Philip IV, Phillip II, Ferdinand II (?), Charles I, Ferdinand III, Philip III and Carlos the Second.
