= Port'Alba, Naples =

City gate in Naples, Italy

Coordinates: 40.849400°N 14.251800°E

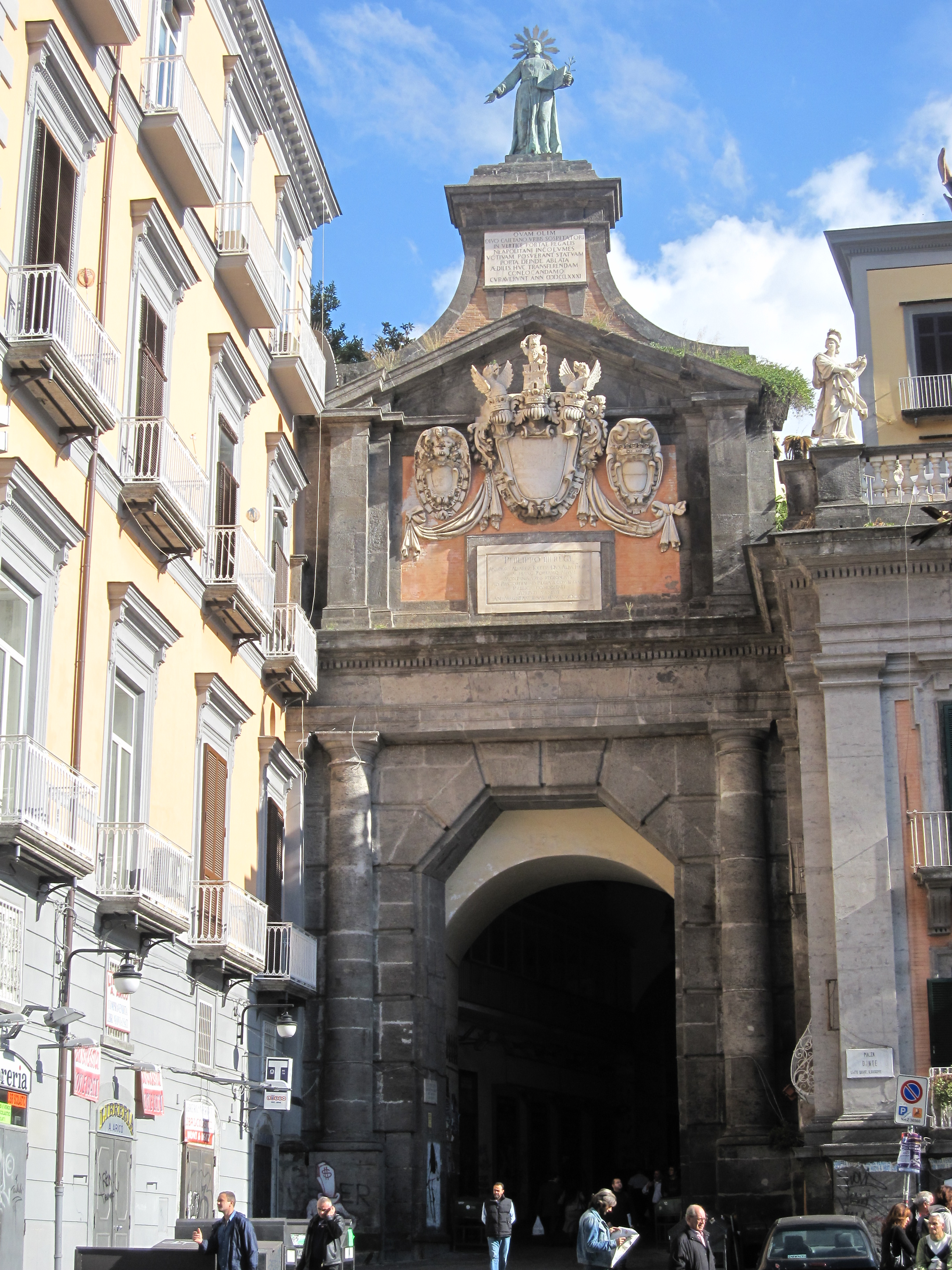
Port'Alba from the Piazza Dante.

The Port'Alba is the remnant of one of the city gates in Naples, Italy. It is located on the northwestern edge of Piazza Dante, just north of Vanvitelli's colonnade, which obscures the bastion into which the gate was carved. The gate leads from the piazza into a pedestrian alley, Via d'Alba with shops selling music instrument, books, and restaurants. The passage leads ultimately to Piazza Bellini.

The gate was a late-comer to the entrances to Naples, and was opened only in 1625 by Antonio Alvárez of Toledo, Duke of Alba, the Spanish viceroy of Naples. It was previously known as Porta Sciuscelle due to a legume that grew outside the gates.
