= Piazza Dante, Naples =

Public square in Naples, Italy

Coordinates: 40°50′56.46″N 14°15′0.26″E

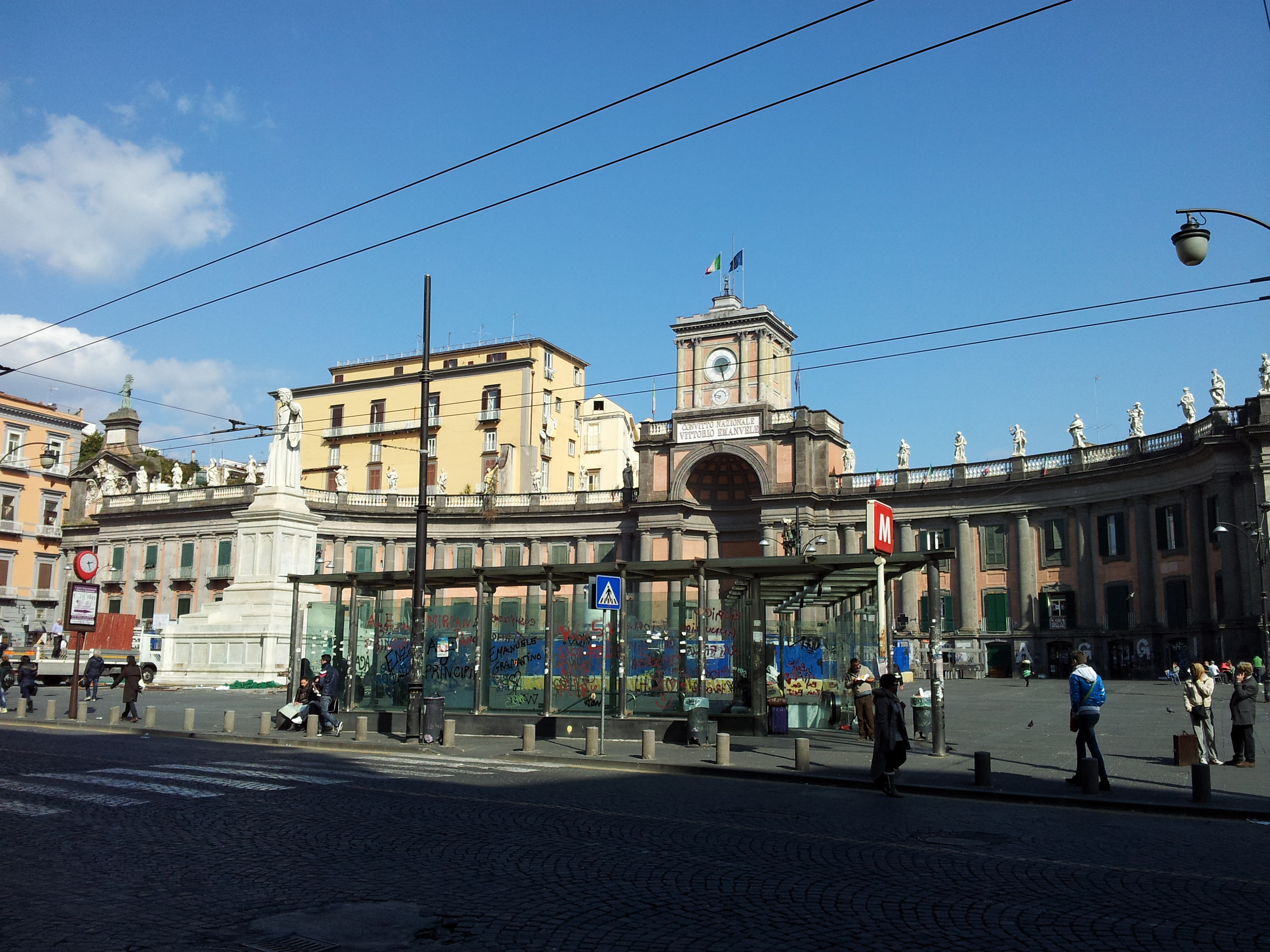
Piazza Dante in Naples

Piazza Dante is a large public square in Naples, Italy, named after the medieval poet Dante Alighieri. The square is dominated by a 19th-century statue of Dante, sculpted by Tito Angelini.

== Overview ==
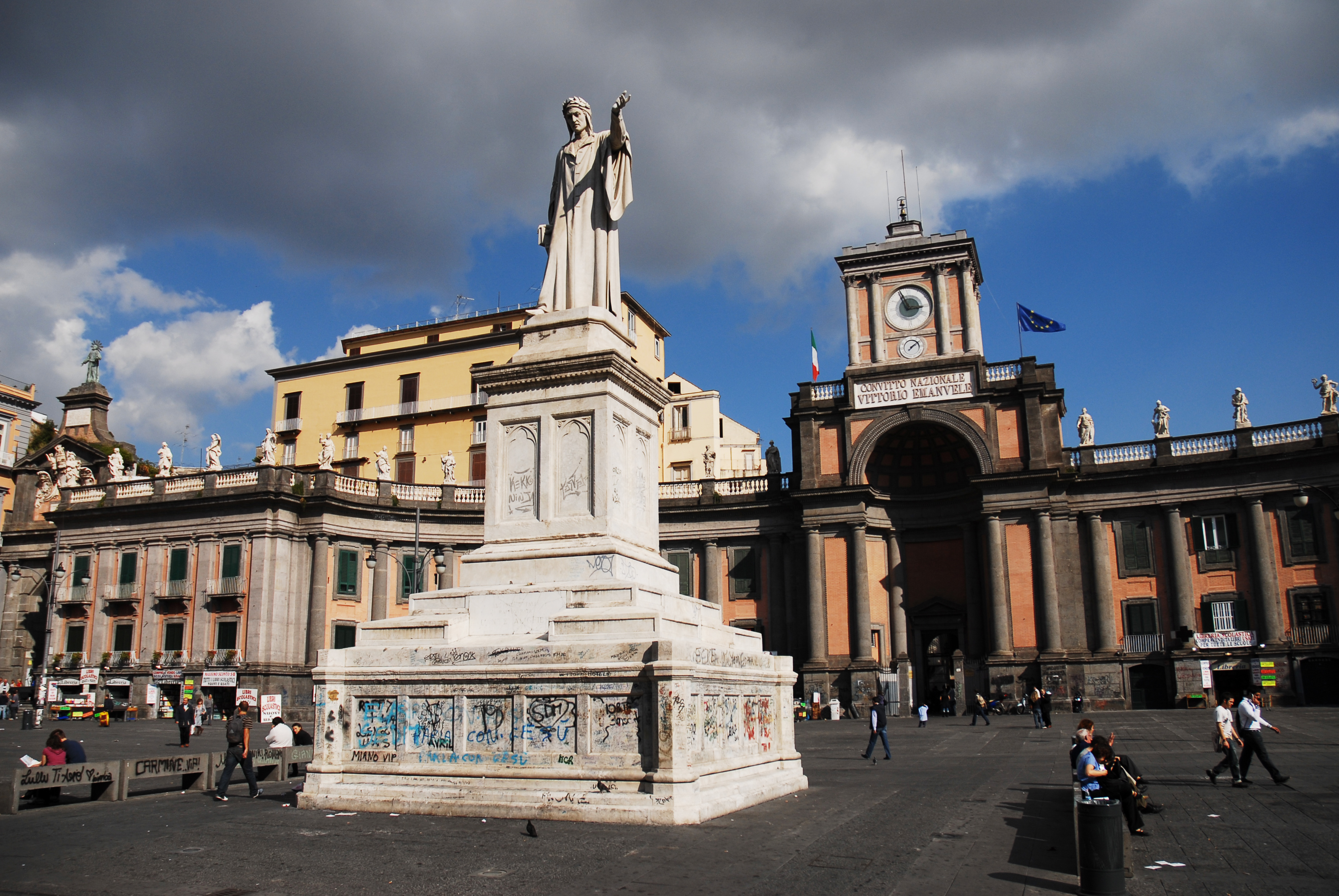
Monument of Dante Alighieri in Piazza Dante

Originally it was called Largo del Mercatello, since there was held, since 1588, one of the two markets of the city, differing with the diminutive Mercatello from the largest and oldest of Piazza del Mercato.

A further importance was the "official" opening of Port'Alba in 1625, official because the population had created an abusive brick in the wall to facilitate communications with the villages, in particular with that of the Avvocata which was rapidly enlarging.

The square assumed its current structure in the second half of the eighteenth century, with the intervention of the architect Luigi Vanvitelli; the "Foro Carolino" commissioned by him was to constitute a monument celebrating the sovereign Carlo III di Borbone. The works lasted from 1757 to 1765, and the result was a large hemicycle, tangential to the Aragonese walls, which seen horizontally incorporated Port'Alba to the west, and flanked the church of San Michele to the east.

The building, with the two characteristic curved wings, sees at the top the presence of twenty-six statues representing the virtues of Carlo (three are by Giuseppe Sanmartino), and in the center a niche that was supposed to house an equestrian statue of the sovereign (which was never built), in addition to a clock tower, from a later period.

From 1843 the central niche constitutes the entrance to the Jesuit boarding school, which became in 1861 “Convitto Nazionale Vittorio Emanuele II”, housed in the rooms of the ancient convent of San Sebastiano and of which the two cloisters are still visible (the dome of the church collapsed in May 1941); the smallest and oldest is a rare example of Naples between the Romanesque and Gothic periods, the largest preserving the sixteenth-century structures.

At the center of the square stands a large statue of Dante Alighieri, the work of sculptors Tito Angelini and Tommaso Solari junior, inaugurated on 13 July 1871 (the date from which the square is named after the great poet) and placed on a base designed by engineer Gherardo Rega.

Today on its sides, more secluded, there are the windows of the exits of the subway line 1. The square was redesigned and refurnished just for the works for the subway, concluded in 2002. The entire hemicycle has thus become a pedestrian area.

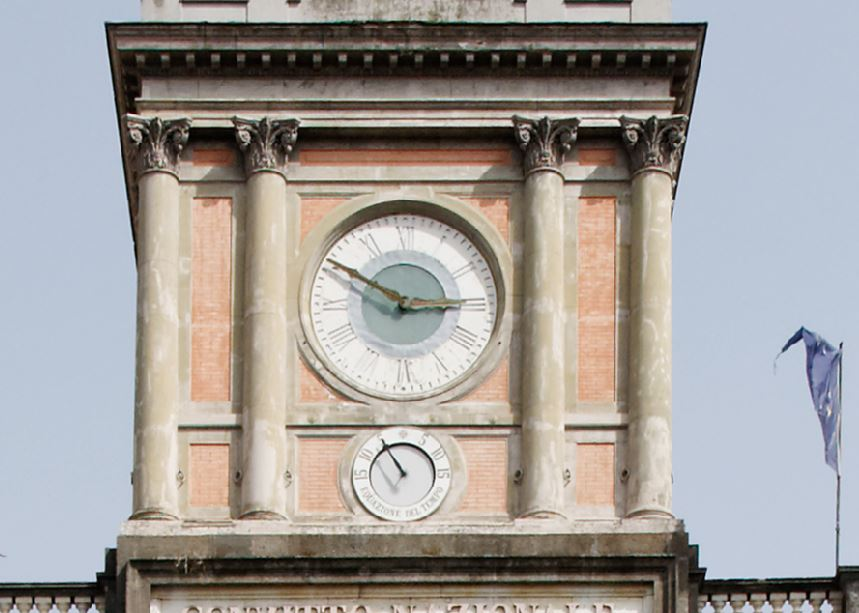
Equation of time (1853).

Still, at the square there are four monumental churches: in the anti-clockwise direction from the north is the Immaculate Conception of the Sanitary Operators, Santa Maria di Caravaggio, San Domenico Soriano and San Michele in Port'Alba.

On the opposite side of the hemicycle the respective ex-convents are situated in addition to the churches of Santa Maria di Caravaggio and San Domenico Soriano: the first became the seat of the institute for the visually impaired founded by Domenico Martuscelli (remembered with his bust carved in 1922 by Luigi De Luca is located in the gardens of the square) and then became the seat of the Second Municipality of Naples. The second convent is now the seat of the municipal registry offices.

Between the two entrances is the Palazzo Ruffo di Bagnara with an adjoining private chapel while on the left side of Port'Alba is the Palazzo Rinuccini. Not far from the square at number 7 of vico Luperano, the villa Conigliera, the latter built during the Aragonese era.

After the construction of the Dante Station of Line 1, the square's hemicycle was completely pedestrianized. In September 2011, the square was completely inhibited from private traffic to discourage the use of cars in the city, becoming a fast lane for the exclusive use of public transport. Subsequently, since the summer of 2013, traffic closure has been reduced from 9 to 18 every day.
