= Catalogue of the Pinacoteca of the Accademia Carrara =

Italian art collection

This is a list of the works in the Accademia Carrara of Bergamo, with artists and works from before the 20th century featured in the painting gallery (Italian: Pinacoteca) of the museum.

== Painters with surnames A–C ==
Painter	Work	Date
Mariotto Albertinelli	Cain and Abel	
" "	Crucifix and Three Monks	
" "	St. John the Evangelist	
" "	St. Mary Magdalen	
Enrico Albrici	Return of Proserpine	
" "	Rape of Proserpine	
Ambrogio of Baldese	Five Saints	
" "	Five Saints	
Beato Angelico and his workshop	Madonna dell'Umiltà	
Apollonio of Giovanni and Marco del Buono	Entry of knights into city	
Andrea Appiani	Portrait of signor Sommariva	
Jacob Adriaensz Backer	Child with garlands in hands	
" "	Child with bird nest	
Alessio Baldovinetti	Self-portrait	
Marco Basaiti	Christ Redeemer	
" "	Madonna with Child, Sts Clare and Francis	
" "	Resurrection of Christ	
" "	Portrait of man with Fur	
" "	Portrait of a Man	
Evaristo Baschenis	Still life with Musical instruments	
" "	Still life with Musical instruments	
" "	Still life with Musical instruments	
" "	Still life with Musical instruments and statuette	
Attributed to Evaristo Baschenis	Portrait of Cleric	
Francesco and Jacopo Bassano (16th century copy)	St. Paul Preaching	
Studio of Jacopo Bassano	Mourning over Dead Christ	
Jacopo Bassano	Madonna with Child and St. John the Baptist	
" "	St. Paul preaching	
Lazzaro Bastiani	Portrait of philosopher Lucio Crasso	
Gentile Bellini	Madonna and Child	
" "	Portrait of Gentleman	
Copy of Gentile Bellini	Portrait of Lorenzo Giustinian	
Giovanni Bellini	Dead Christ with Mary and St. John the Evangelist	
" "	Madonna and Child (Alzano)	
" "	Madonna and Child	
" "	Portrait of young man	
Studio of Giovanni Bellini	Portrait of young man	
Jacopo Bellini	Madonna and Child	
Bernardo Bellotto	Arch of Titus in the Roman Forum	
Bonifacio Bembo	Assumption of Maria in the Presence of Saints and Apostles	
" "	St. Francis Receives Stigmata	
Giovanni Francesco Bembo	Martyrdom of St. Stephen	
" "	St. Stephan preaching	
" "	St. Stephen expulsed from synagogue	
Job Adriaensz Berckheyde	Façade of church	
Ambrogio Bergognone	Encounter of St. Ambrose and Theodore	
" "	Madonna and Child	
" "	Madonna of the Milk	
" "	St. Jerome	
" "	St. John the Evangelist	
" "	St. Paul	
" "	St. Martha	
Giuseppe Bertini	Beatrice	
Bartolomeo Bettera	Still life with musical instruments with astrolabe	
" "	Still life with Musical Instruments and Carillon	
Ambrogio Bevilacqua (il Liberale)	Madonna enthroned behind two Saints and Donor	
Moise’ Bianchi	Boats docked on Venetian Canal	
Boccaccio Boccaccino	Cain and Abel	
Giovanni Antonio Boltraffio	Madonna and Child	
" "	Salvator Mundi	
Paolo Bonomino	Portrait of Zenobia Benaglio Marenzi	
Francesco Bonsignori (attributed)	Portrait of Gian Francesco Gonzaga	
Sébastien Bourdon	Landscape with two girls with grape basket	
" "	Harvesting grapes	
Ambrosius Bosschaert	Pyramus and Thisbe	
Sandro Botticelli	The Story of Virginia	
Studio of Sandro Botticelli	The Redeemer	
" "	Portrait of Giuliano de' Medici	
Francesco Botticini	Virgin in adoration of the child	
" "	Tobias and the Archangel Raphael	
Richard Brakenburg	The nuptial contract	
Karel Breydel	Terrestrial Paradis	
Jan Brueghel the Elder	Portrait of Flora beside Flowers	
" "	Vase of Flowers with Ring and Diamond	
Studio of Jan Brueghel the Elder	Christ and the Adulteress (replica)	
Attributed to Zanetto Bugatto	St. Jerome	
Giovanni Busi (il Cariani)	Flight to Egypt	
" "	The musicians	
" "	Madonna and Child and a Donor	
" "	Portrait of Giovanni Benedetto Caravaggi	
" "	Portrait of man with large beret	
" "	Holy conversation	
" "	St. Catherine	
Bernardino Butinone	Circumcision	
Amero Cagnoni	Lady window-shopping	
Vincenzo Camuccini	Judith	
Canaletto	The Grand Canal of Venice	
Simone Cantarini	Rest during flight to Egypt	
Follower of Caravaggio	St. Peter visits St. Agatha in prison	
Giovanni Cariani	Portrait of Lady with sculpted plinth (La Schiavona)	
Luca Carlevarijs	Landscape with seaport	
" "	Reception of an Ambassador	
Giovanni Carnovali (il Piccio)	Self-portrait with palette	
" "	Flora	
" "	Flora	
" "	Flora	
" "	Portrait of countess Anastasia Spini	
" "	Portrait of Elena Marenzi	
Giovanni Carnovali (il Piccio)	Portrait of Giacomo Trécourt	
" "	Portrait of Gigia Riccardi	
Angelo Caroselli	Salomè with the head of Baptist	
Giovanni Francesco Caroto	Judgement of Solomon	
Copy of Vittore Carpaccio	Portrait of the doge Loredan	
Vittore Carpaccio	The Judgement of Paris	
" "	Birth of the Virgin	
" "	St. Rocco and Donor	
" "	Six saints	
Giovanni Carnovali (il Piccio)	Portrait of Pietro Ghidini	
" "	Portrait of Giovanni Maironi da Ponte	
Attributed to Ludovico Carracci	Flagellation of Christ	
Vincenzo Catena	Portrait of gentleman with sword	
Giovanni Paolo Cavagna	Madonna of the belt	
" "	Gentleman with two children	
Paolo Moranda Cavazzola	Portrait of lady with capigliara	
Bernardino da Cotignola	Holy Family	
Jacques Courtois (Borgognone) (attributed)	Assault by cavalry	
" "	Engagement by cavalry	
Giovanni Battista Crespi (il Cerano)	Head of St. John the Baptist	
Carlo Ceresa	Madonna in Glory and Saints	
" "	Portrait of Gentleman of House Marenzi	
" "	Portrait of Jacopo Tiraboschi	
" "	Portrait of a Monk	
Giacomo Ceruti	Mary Magdalen in Prayer	
" "	Masked Men and Saleswoman	
" "	Portrait of girl with fan	
Attributed to Bartolomeo Cesi	St. Angela Merici	
Attributed to Antonio Cicognara	St. Catherine and Devout Nun (front) and Franciscan Saint (verso)	
Vincenzo Civerchio	Annunciation (externa) and Saints Benedetto and Scolastica (internal)	
Jean Clouet	Portrait of Louis de Clève	
Francesco Codino	Still-life with Fruit Basket	
" "	Still-life with Fruits and Ming Vase	
Francesco Coghetti	Agar and Ishmael Visited by the Angel	
Girolamo Colleoni	Madonna and Child and Three Saint in a Landscape	
Lorenzo Costa	St. John the Evangelist	
School of Lorenzo Costa	The Magdalen	
Lorenzo di Credi(school of)	Adoration of the Christ child	
" "	Madonna and Child	
Carlo Crivelli	Madonna and Child	
Attributed to Dario da Pordenone	St. Bernardino of Siena	
Bernardino de Conti	Madonna of the milk	

== Painters with surnames D–L ==
Painter	Work	Date
Francesco Daggiù (Cappella)	Self-portrait	
Giovanni Battista dell'Era	Esther at the feet of Assuerus	
Giuseppe Diotti	Benediction of Jacob	
Jacobsz Dirck (attributed)	Cleric meditates over a skull	
Gaspare Diziani	Dominican Saints in glory	
Battista Dossi	Madonna and Child, St. George and Holy Bishop	
Dosso Dossi (attributed)	Angelo Playing Harp	
Albrecht Dürer	Road to Calvary	
School of Albrecht Dürer	Portrait in figure of St. Sebastian	
El Greco	St. Francis receives stigmata	
Adam Elsheimer School of	St. Jerome in landscape	
Barend Fabritius	Fable of satyr and villager	
Aniello Falcone	Skirmish of horsemen	
" "	Skirmish of horsemen with artillery	
Giovanni Paolo di Fei	Altarpiece of the Virgin	
Defendente Ferrari	Christ on Cross	
" "	Flagellation of Christ	
Federico Ferrari	Glory of the condottieri of Bergamo	
Gaudenzio Ferrari	Madonna and Child	
Gregorio de Ferrari	Cleopatra	
Antonio Fontanesi	The oak tree	
Vincenzo Foppa	St. Jerome	
" "	Three crucifixes	
Pier Francesco Foschi (copy of Baccio Bandinelli)	Portrait of young man	
Fra' Galgario	Self-portrait as painter	
" "	Insegnia del barbiere Oletta	
" "	Portrait of Count Giovanni Secco Suardo and servant	
" "	Portrait of Count Girolamo Secco Suardo	
" "	Portrait of Bertrama Daina de' Valsecchi	
" "	Portrait of Elisabetta Piavani Ghidotti	
" "	Portrait of Filippo Marenzi	
" "	Portrait of Francesco Maria Bruntino	
" "	Portrait of gentleman of house of Marenzi	
" "	Portrait of Giacomo Bettami de' Baizini	
" "	Portrait of young painter	
" "	Portrait of young man	
" "	Portrait of young man	
" "	Portrait of old priest	
" "	Portrait of old painter	
" "	Head of Vitellio imperatore	
Francesco Bassano	Shepherd playing flute	
Francesco di Simone da Santacroce	Annunciation	
" "	St. James the great	
" "	St. John the Baptist	
" "	St. Alexander	
Francesco Raibolino (Francia)	Christ carrying Cross	
" "	Vulcan	
Bernardino Fungai	Madonna and Child and Two Angels	
Il Garofalo	Madonna and Child	
" "	Madonna and Child	
" "	Madonna with Child and Saints Roch and Sebastian	
Melchiorre Gherardini (Ceranino)	Beheading of St. John the Baptist	
Nicolò Giolfino	Madonna and Child	
Adrien de Gryef	Dogs and boar in a landscape	
Giovanni Pietro da Cemmo (attributed)	St. Anthony of Padua	
Giovan Antonio Guadagnini	Self-portrait	
Francesco Guardi	Architecture with figures masked for carnaval	
" "	Arch with macchiette	
" "	Atrium of a villa with staircase and figures	
" "	Atrium and staircase of palace	
" "	Capriccio of Doge's Palace	
" "	Rialto Bridge with the shores of Vin	
" "	Rio dei Mendicanti in Venice	
" "	Piazza St. Marco in Venice	
" "	St. Giorgio Maggiore with the tip of the Giudecca	
Gianantonio Guardi	Franciscan Cloister in Venice	
" "	Portico at the shores of a lake	
Guercino studio of (copy)	The bath of Diana	
Dirck Hals	Woman reads under candlelight	
Francesco Hayez	Bather	
Gerard Hoett the Elder	A Cave	
Jacobello del Fiore (school of)	Madonna and Child and Stories of the Passion	
Jacobello of Antonello da Messina	Madonna and Child	
Jacometto Venziano (attributed)	St Sebastian	
Jacopo da Valenza	Christ Savior of the world	
Jacopo del Sellaio	Redeemer with symbols of the Passion	
Jacob Jordaens (school of)	Hercules carries 3 women on his back (bozzetto)	
Neroccio de’ Landi	Madonna and Child	
Luigi Lanza	View of Castel dell'Ovo in Naples	
Gregorio Lazzarini	Self-portrait	
Leonardo da Vinci School of 16th century	Madonna and Child and St Catherine	
Bernardino Licinio	Mystical night of St. Catherine	
Filippo Lippi Copy of Pseudo Pier Francesco Fiorentino	St Jerome and Franciscan monks	
Gian Paolo Lolmo	Portrait of 19 year old	
Pietro Longhi	Il ridotto (Masked Venetians)	
" "	Visiting grandmother	
Lorenzo Lotto	Deposition of Christ	
" "	Martyrdom of St Stephen	
" "	Miracle of St Dominic	
" "	Mystical night of St Catherine	
" "	Portrait of youngman	
" "	Portrait of Lucina Brembati	
" "	Holy Family and St Catherine	
Fiorenzo of Lorenzo	St. Jerome penitent	
Ponziano Loverini	Self-portrait	
Bernardino Luini	Madonna and Child and St. John the Baptist	
" "	Nativity	
Bernardino di Mariotto	Mourning over dead Christ	

== Painters with surnames M–R ==
Painter	Work	Date
Zanobi Machiavelli	Madonna and Child	
Nicolaes Maes	Portrait of young male	
Master of Twelve Apostles	Adoration of the Christ child	
Master of 1458	Angels with instruments of Passion	
Master of 1458	Angels with instruments of Passion	
Master of 1458	St. Paul	
Master of 1458	St. Peter	
Master of Legend of the Magdalen (attributed)	Madonna of the milk	
Master of the Legend of St. Ursula	Portrait of young man	
Master of the Sforza Altarpiece	St. Ambrose	
Master of the Solomon Altarpiece	Assumption of the Virgin	
Master of the Pietà of Stockholm	Madonna and Child and angels	
Master of Francoforte (attributed)	Madonna and Child in landscape	
Master of Santa Verdiana	Marriage of the Virgin	
Cesare Magni	Madonna and Child and St. John the Baptist	
Gian Francesco Maineri	Ecce Homo	
Andrea Mantegna	Madonna and Child	
Marco da Oggiono	St. Rocco	
Il Marescalco (Giovanni Buonconsiglio)(attributed)	Transfiguration of Christ	
Antonio Marini	Landscape with natural arch	
Antonio Marinoni (studio of)	Madonna Adored by Donors	
Marco Marziale	Madonna and Child and Donors	
Marzio Masturzo (attributed)	Battling knights	
Matteo of Giovanni	Madonna and Child, Saints and Angels	
Ludovico Mazzolino	Adoration of Christ-child	
Altobello Melone	Madonna and Child	
" "	Madonna and Child and St. John the Baptist	
" "	Portrait young male (c.d. Cesare Borgia)	
Theobald Michau	Landscape with farmers and animals at river	
Jan Miense Molenaer	Young smoker	
Lorenzo Monaco	Vir Dolorum	
Bernardo Monsù	Portrait of a knight of St. George	
Bartolomeo Montagna	Madonna with Child and Saints Roch and Sebastian	
Bartolomeo Montagna	St. Jerome	
Morazzone	Madonna in glory with Saints Cosmas and Damian	
Moretto da Brescia	Christ and the Samaritan Woman	
" "	Redeemer with Cross and Donor	
" "	Holy Family with young St. John the Baptist	
Domenico Morone	St. John the Evangelist	
Francesco Morone	Madonna and Child and Four Saints	
Giovanni Battista Moroni	Portrait of girl of the family Redetti	
" "	Portrait of Bernardo Spini	
" "	Portrait of dama trentenne	
" "	Portrait of lady with book	
" "	Portrait of Giovan Pietro Maffeis	
" "	Portrait of young man	
" "	Portrait of Isotta Brembati Grumelli	
" "	Portrait of Pace Rivola Spini	
" "	Portrait of Paolo Vidoni Cedrelli	
" "	Portrait of priest	
" "	Portrait of seated man	
" "	Portrait of old man in red	
" "	Portrait of old man seated	
" "	Portrait young man	
" "	St. Jerome in meditation	
" "	Elder man with beret	
Bartolomeo Nazzari	Head of old woman	
" "	Head of old man	
Giuseppe de Nittis	Napoli dall'Hotel Bertolini	
Giuseppe Nogari	Portrait of bearded man	
Giuseppe Nogari	Portrait of old man	
Padovanino	Bacchus and Ariadne (copy of Titian)	
" "	The Andrian Bacchanal (copy of Titian)	
" "	Triumph of Thetys	
" "	Worship of Venus (copy of Titian)	
Eleuterio Pagliano	Nighttime Promenade	
Anthonie Palamedesz.	Portrait of young girl	
Palma il Giovane	Flagellation of Christ	
" "	Christ and Angel	
Palma il Vecchio	Madonna and Child behind St. John and Magdalene	
Carlo Francesco Panfilo	Madonna and Child	
" "	Portrait of young lady	
Pietro Paolini	St. Jerome in his studio	
Parmigianino School of	Mystical night of St. Catherine	
Andrea Pastò	Reception at villa Widmann a Bagnoli	
Pedro Campaña	Deposition at the Sepulchre	
Giuseppe Pellizza da Volpedo	Remembrance of a sorrow	
Pietro Perugino and workshop	Adoration by shepherds	
Francesco Pesellino	Story of Griselda: Gualtieri and Citizens of Saluzzo	
" "	Story of Griselda: Meeting and marriage of Gualtieri and Griselda	
Giovanni Pezzotta	Portrait of Francesco Monetti	
Pietro da Messina	St. Sebastian	
Pinturicchio	St. Augustine preaching	
Sebastiano del Piombo	St. Anthony of Padua	
Piola P. G	Adoration by shepherds	
Pisanello	Portrait of Lionello d'Este	
Pordenone	St. Rocco fed by a dog	
Giovanni Ambrogio de' Predis	Portrait of young gentleman	
Jacob de Wet	St. Jerome in a grotto	
Gaetano Previati	Paolo and Francesca	
Andrea Previtali	Dead Christ behind Mary and John	
" "	Madonna Baglioni	
" "	Madonna and Child	
" "	Madonna and Child	
" "	Madonna and Child two Saints and Friars	
" "	Madonna enthroned and Saints Sebastian and Thomas Aquinas	
" "	Mystical Night of St. Catherine and Saints	
" "	Pentecost	
" "	St. Francis of Assisi	
" "	St. Lawrence	
" "	St. Paul	
" "	St. Peter	
" "	St. Quirino	
" "	St. Rocco	
" "	St. Anthony Abbot	
Giulio Cesare Procaccini	Susanna and the elders	
Pseudo Giovenone	St. Bonaventure and donors	
Pseudo Giovenone	St. Bonaventure in the studio	
Francesco Maria Raineri (Schivenoglia)	Dream of St. Giuseppe	
Bartolommeo Ramenghi	Four martyrs and holy bishop	
Bartolomeo Veneto	Madonna and Child	
Raphael	Portrait in figure of St. Sebastian	
Attributed to Marco Ricci	Countryside with town and peasants	
Attributed to Marco Ricci	Landscape	
Sebastiano Ricci	Portrait of a Lady	
Jacopo Ripanda (attributed)	Battle Scene	
Girolamo Romanino	Soldiers in the Holy Sepulcher	
" "	A cardinal celebrates Mass of St. Apollonio	
Peter Paul Rubens	Santa Domitilla	
Studio of Rubens	St. Agatha appears to St. Lucia Martyr	
School of Rubens	Roman charity	

== Painters with surnames S–Z ==
Painter	Work	Date
Sassoferrato	Madonna in oration	
Girolamo da Santacroce (attributed)	Shepherds with goat	
Girolamo da Santacroce	Santa Giustina	
" "	St. Martyr	
Roelandt Savery	Landscape with dogs and deer	
" "	Landscape with tori al guado	
Scarsellino	Madonna and Child and young St. John	
Bernardo Schedoni	Holy Family and young St. John	
Bartolomeo Schedoni (copy of Modenese School) 17th century	Holy Family at work	
Giorgio Schiavone	St. Jerome	
" "	Sant'Alessio	
Giovanni Stefano	Mourning over dead Christ	
School of Bergamo 15th century	St. Nicola of Bari	
School of Cremona (attributed)	Portrait of Giovan Battista Santini	
School of Ferrara (attributed) 16th century	Portrait of young man	
School Flemish 16th century	Rissa of peasants (copy of Bosch H.)	
School Flemish 17th century (copy of Brueghel the elder)	Vase of flowers with butterfly	
School of Florence 16th century	Portrait of Alessandro de' Medici	
School of France 16th century	Portrait of gentleman	
School of France 16th century	Portrait of gentleman	
School of Lombardy 15th century	Triumph of Love	
School of Lombardy 16th century	La Virgin with le Marie	
School of Naples 17th century	Still-life with lemons	
School of Naples 17th century	Still-life with meat, cheese, and wine	
Dutch painting 16th century	Christ carrying cross	
Dutch painting 17th century	Landscape of forest with horsemen and pedestrians	
Dutch painting 17th century	Portrait of lady	
Dutch painting 17th century	Portrait of young man	
Dutch 17th century	Scene in tavern	
School of Piedmont 16th century	Crucifixion	
School of Piedmont 16th century	St. Elisabeth of Hungary (attributed)	
School of Siena 16th century	Flight of Clelia	
School of Germany 16th century	St. Joseph of Arimathea	
School of Germany 16th century	St. Mary Magdalen	
School of Umbro-Roman 15th century	Portrait of young man (Percivalle Riario, attributed)	
School of Venice 16th century	Countryside with figures	
School of Venice 16th century	Portrait of young man	
School of Venice 17th century	Knights in fray of battle	
School of Venice 18th century	Attack by knights against a cannon battery	
School of Venice 18th century	Battle by knights near bridge	
Enrico Scuri	Portrait of the poet Pietro Ruggeri da Stabello	
Studio of Luca Signorelli	Madonna and Child	
Studio of Luca Signorelli	St. Rocco and St. Sebastian	
Attributed to Francesco Simonini	Battle by knights near castle	
Francesco Simonini (attributed)	Encounter of knights	
Andrea Solario	Ecce Homo	
Follower of Andrea Solario 16th century	Madonna of the green cushion	
Francesco Solimena	Santa Cecilia	
Bernardo Strozzi	Portrait of cleric	
Cesare Tallone	Portrait of Vittore Tasca	
Enea Talpino	Mourning dead Christ	
" "	Beheading of St. Alexander	
" "	Portrait of gentleman	
" "	Sant'Alessandro destroys idols	
" "	Sant'Anna, Virgin and Christ-child	
Attributed to Abraham Teniers	Tavern with drinker	
David Teniers the Elder	Drinker and two peasants	
Attributed to David Teniers the Younger	Pastoral festivity	
Studio of Giovanni Battista Tiepolo	Baptism of Christ	
Studio of Giovanni Battista Tiepolo	John the Baptist preaching	
Giovanni Battista Tiepolo	Sts Massimo and Osvaldo	
" "	Madonna and Child	
" "	Martyrdom of St Giovanni Episcopo	
" "	Martyrdom of St John Nepomuk	
Tintoretto (attributed)	Portrait of old man (Gerolamo Venier)	
Titian	Madonna and Child	
" "	Orpheus and Eurydice	
Giacomo Trécourt	Portrait of Lena Presti as a girl	
" "	Portrait of a young girl	
Cosimo Tura	Madonna with Child	
Giovanni da Udine	Madonna enthroned behind angels, Saints and Donors	
Hendrick van Balen and David Teniers the Elder	Christ in the house of Martha and Mary	
Nicolaes van Berchem (attributed)	Shepherds with cow and goats	
Joos van Craesbeeck	Peasants in a tavern ("The king drinks!")	
Gerbrandt van den Eeckhout	Self-portrait	
Aert van der Neer	Landscape with lagoon	
Rogier van der Weyden	Pietà	
Jan van Goyen	Seascape with fishing boat	
Jan van Kessel	Still-life basket with grape and strawberies	
Studio of Jan van Kessel	Portrait of Andreas Conter	
Diego Velázquez (attributed)	Portrait of girl	
Daniel Vertangen	Venus asleep with Cupid and Satyrs	
Vicino da Ferrara	Head of crying angel	
David Vinckeboons and workshop	Forested landscape with knights	
Timoteo Viti	Santa Margherita	
Vittore Belliniano	Crucifix in adoration by donor	
Alvise Vivarini	Two holy bishops, St. Francis and donor	
" "	St. Jerome	
Antonio Vivarini	Baptism of St Augustine	
" "	Martyrdom of Santa Lucia	
" "	Martyrdom of Sant'Apollonia	
" "	St. Barnabas	
" "	St. Jerome	
Bartolomeo Vivarini	Angel in adoration	
" "	Angel in adoration	
" "	Madonna and Child	
" "	Madonna enthroned	
" "	St. John the Baptist	
" "	St Martin and the poor	
" "	St Michael Archangel	
" "	St Peter	
" "	St Sebastian	
" "	Trinity	
Louis Rene Vouet	Portrait of young man with armor	
Simon Vouet	Virgin Mary	
Jan Wijnantz	Landscape with figure	
Francesco Zaganelli	Preaching of St Anthony of Padua to Fishes	
Giuseppe Zais	Hills with stream and hunters	
Bernardino Zenale	Madonna and Child	
" "	Madonna of the milk	
Marco Zoppo	St Jerome	
Francesco Zuccarelli	Landscape with town, knight and beggars	
" "	Landscape with waterfall and shepherds	
" "	Landscape with river and turret	
" "	Landscape with shepherdess and knight	
" "	Landscape with bridge and knight	
" "	Shepherdess at rest with youngman playing flute	
" "	Portrait of Ercole Comini at two years	
" "	Portrait of child Margherita Tassi	

== Notes ==
- Accademia Carrara on website of Lombardia Beni Culturali
