= Michele Pagano (painter) =

Italian painter

Michele Pagano (1697–1732) was an Italian painter of the late Baroque period, active in his natal city of Naples.

Pagano initially trained under Raimondo di Dominici, known as il Maltese. Working later with Bernardo de Dominici, he became a follower of Franz Joachim Beich, and flourished as a landscape painter or vedutista, but died in his mid-thirties. He left di Dominici to work with Gaetano Martoriello. He is said to have died from Mercury treatment of venereal disease. It is unknown if he is a distant relation to Francesco Pagano, a painter of the 15th century in Naples.
