= Francesco Rizzo =

Francesco Rizzo may refer to:

- Francesco Rizzo (footballer) (1943–2022), Italian footballer
- Francesco Rizzo da Santacroce (1500s-1541), painter
