= Beich =

Beich may refer to:

== People ==
- Ole Beich, musician from the 1980s
- Franz Joachim Beich, classical composer from the 1700s

== Places ==
- Beich Pass, a pass in the Oberaletsch Glacier
