= Nicola Massaro =

Italian painter

Nicola or Niccolo Massaro (died 1704) was an Italian painter of the late-Baroque period, active in his native city of Naples. He painted mainly marine vedute and landscapes in the style of his master, Salvatore Rosa. One of his colleagues was Marzio Masturzo. One of his pupils was Gaetano Martoriello, and Massaro's sons Girolamo and Gennaro.
