= Giacomo del Pò =

Italian Baroque painter (1654–1726)

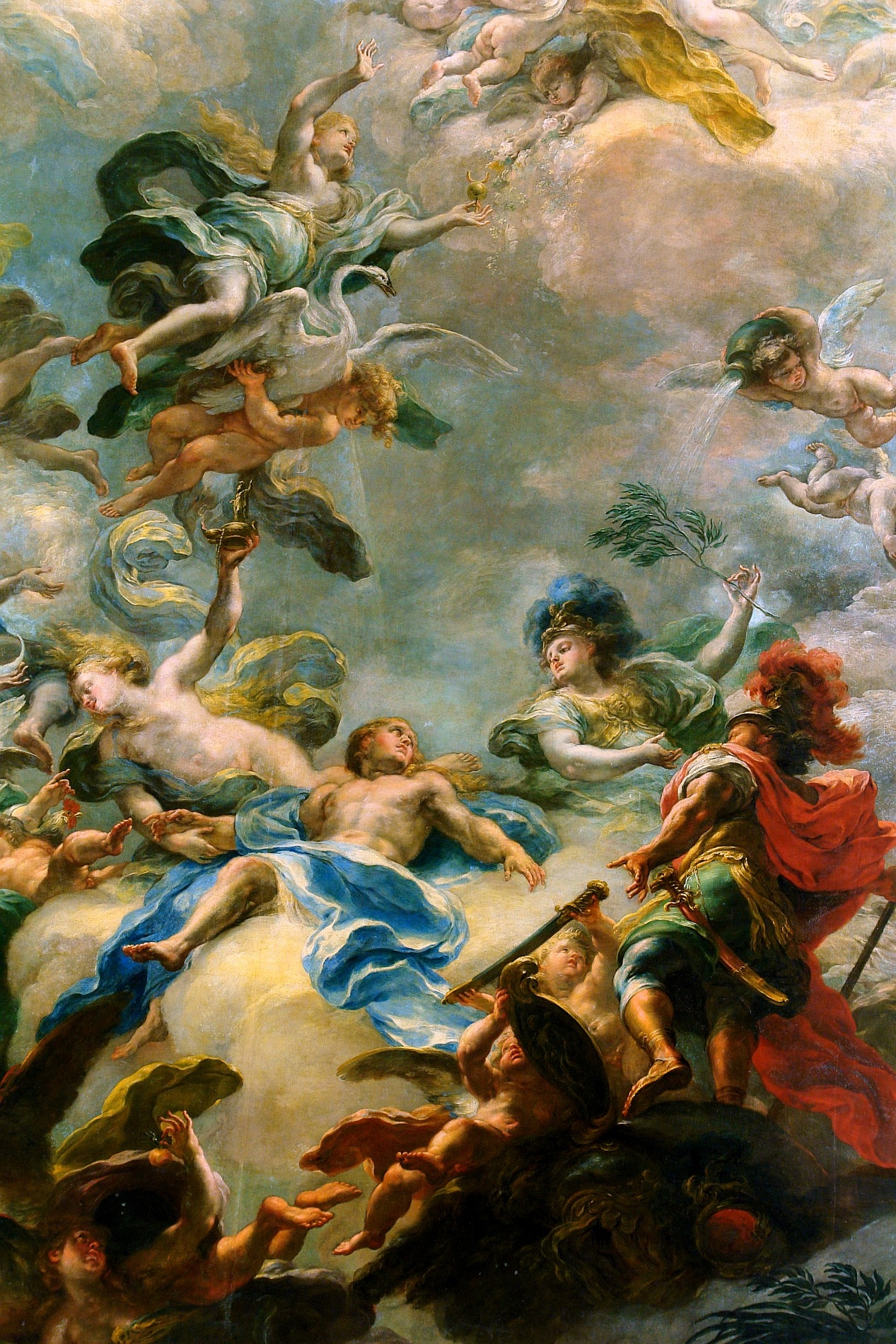
- Detail of ceiling painting for the Upper Belvedere, Vienna
- Born: 1654; Palermo, Kingdom of Sicily
- Died: 15 November 1726 (aged 71–72); Naples, Kingdom of Naples
- Education: Pietro del Pò
- Known for: Painting
- Movement: Baroque

Giacomo del Pò (1654 – 15 November 1726), also spelled del Po, was an Italian Baroque painter and engraver.

== Biography ==
=== Early life and education ===
He was born in Palermo (other sources say Rome or Naples), the son of Pietro del Pò who was also his teacher. He was admitted to the Roman Accademia di San Luca in 1664. He was chiefly occupied in decorating the mansions of the Neapolitan nobility with emblematical and allegorical subjects. His earliest surviving paintings, Virgin and Child with St. Gaetano and Rest on the Flight into Egypt (both 1685; Sorrento, Sant'Antonino), are in the late Baroque classicist idiom then current in Rome. Within a short time, however, he came under the spell of Luca Giordano, whose influence is evident already in the Plague of Sorrento (1687; Sorrento, Sant'Antonino). In the few pictures securely datable to the 1690s, such as the Annunciation (1693) and Visitation (both Naples, Sant'Agostino degli Scalzi), his accommodation of Neapolitan traditions is even stronger. His use of dark underpainting results in deep tonalities, and the emotional expressiveness of the figures often borders on sentimentality, particularly in single-figure compositions like the St. Casimir (Girolamini, Naples) and St. Januarius (c. 1700; Naples, Museo di Capodimonte).

=== Mature work ===
Between 1700 and 1710 del Pò became one of the most dominant painters in Naples, with Francesco Solimena and Paolo de Matteis. In contrast to Solimena’s powerful chiaroscuro and de Matteis’s limp classicism, he offered an expressive, anti-classical style characterized by streaming filaments of deeply saturated colour, shimmering light effects and sweeping compositional movements that bear a strong affinity to the Genoese works of Gregorio De Ferrari; del Pò may have known of these through drawings and engravings. Although most of his surviving works are altarpieces and easel paintings, his contemporary reputation rested above all on the success of his decorative frescoes in Neapolitan palazzi. His only extant work in this genre consists of three frescoed ceilings, depicting elaborate allegorical subjects, in the Palazzo Mattei (formerly the palace of the Duca di Positano), Naples, for which two oil sketches, the Triumph of the Virtues and the Allegory of Virtue (Naples, National Museum of San Martino), survive.

Other frescoes are known only through Bernardo de' Dominici’s descriptions and through rare oil sketches (e.g. Glory Putting the Vices to Flight, 1710; Museum of Fine Arts of Rennes; for an untraced decoration for the Duca di Maddaloni’s palazzo in Naples). Del Pò collaborated with Francesco di Maria and Francesco de Mura, in the frescoes for the Palazzo Carafa and the palace of the Prince Caracciolo de Avellino. He painted frescoes in the gallery of the Marquis of Genzano. In these works del Pò richly interlaced monochromatic figures with others painted in naturalistic colours to produce effects that de' Dominici called ‘bizzaro e pittoresco’; these were to constitute del Pò’s principal legacy to 18th-century painting in Naples.

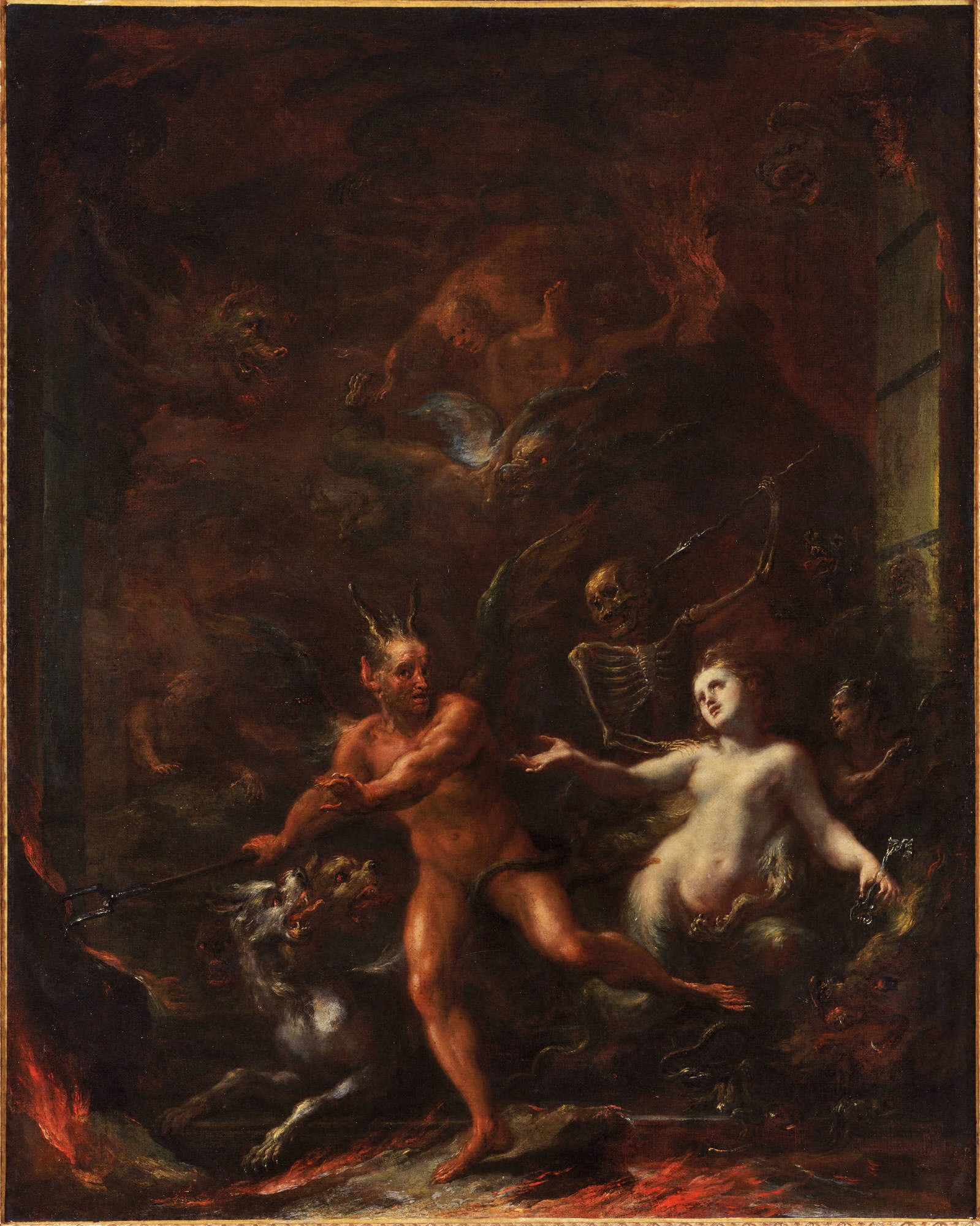
Gates of Hell, from Milton's Paradise Lost

Several of his church frescoes in Naples are in a similar manner, notably those in the transepts of Santa Teresa agli Studi (1708) and those above the portal to the convent of San Gregorio Armeno (c. 1715–19). In these, as in the commemorative portraits of Gian Domenico Milano and Giacomo Milano (1711–12) in the sacristy of San Domenico Maggiore, Correggesque angels and allegorical virtues in imitation of bronze or marble sculpture are combined with the principal figures to create a dense pictorial structure. Del Pò’s numerous small pictures on secular themes were characterized after about 1710 by increasing luminosity and a more distinctly 18th-century style. He painted mythological works and a large number of pictures based upon literary sources, such as two scenes from Paradise Lost – the Gates of Hell and the Sleep of Adam and Eve (both Princeton University Art Museum) – which were the earliest painted illustrations of Milton’s epic poem in Italy. Camilla in Battle (New York, P. Ganz priv. col.), which forms part of a series of paintings on copper illustrating scenes from the Aeneid, borrows its composition from del Pò’s Triumph of St. John of the Cross (1708; Naples, Santa Teresa agli Studi).

=== Later career ===
In the decade before his death del Po’s style fluctuated between extreme fluidity and a resurgence of cooler, more classical forms. His three canvases of scenes from the Life of St. Catherine and vault fresco of the Virgin and Child in Glory in the chapel of St. Catherine (consecrated 1714) in Santa Caterina a Formiello, Naples, bear witness to the first of these tendencies: streaming paint and brilliant colour effects in the altarpiece and lateral canvases, and a vault fresco based ultimately on the illusionistic devices employed by Giovanni Battista Gaulli in Rome. Del Pò’s St. Dominic (1717) in the same church, by contrast, shows a calmer, more frontal composition and a more linear technique. Similar handling is evident in the central portion of his Virgin of the Rosary (c. 1715–20; San Pietro Martire, Naples), although the 15 Miracles on copper surrounding this canvas are among his most brilliantly fluid creations. A similar freedom characterizes the last great achievement of his career: three large canvases on allegorical themes painted in Naples c. 1722 for ceilings of the Upper Belvedere in Vienna, newly constructed for Prince Eugene of Savoy. These late works served as models for central European painters throughout the 18th century. Giacomo del Poò died in Naples on 15 November 1726.

=== Engravings and theatre ===
In addition to his paintings, del Pò left a small body of engravings, datable for the most part from the early years of his career. Consisting of both original compositions and reproductions of his own and others’ compositions, some were produced as single sheets, although many served as book illustrations. Later he also designed sets and costumes for productions at the Teatro di San Bartolomeo in Naples, where his stepbrother Andrea del Pò was impresario. De' Dominici noted that he supplied designs for altars and chapels in Naples, but none of these architectural works has been identified.

== Legacy ==
In Naples del Po’s influence was considerable. His pupils, who included Gaetano Martoriello and Giuseppe Tomajuoli, were only modestly talented and benefited little from the example of his idiosyncratic style; but such diverse figures as Domenico Antonio Vaccaro and Pietro Bardellino owed him a considerable debt.

== Gallery ==
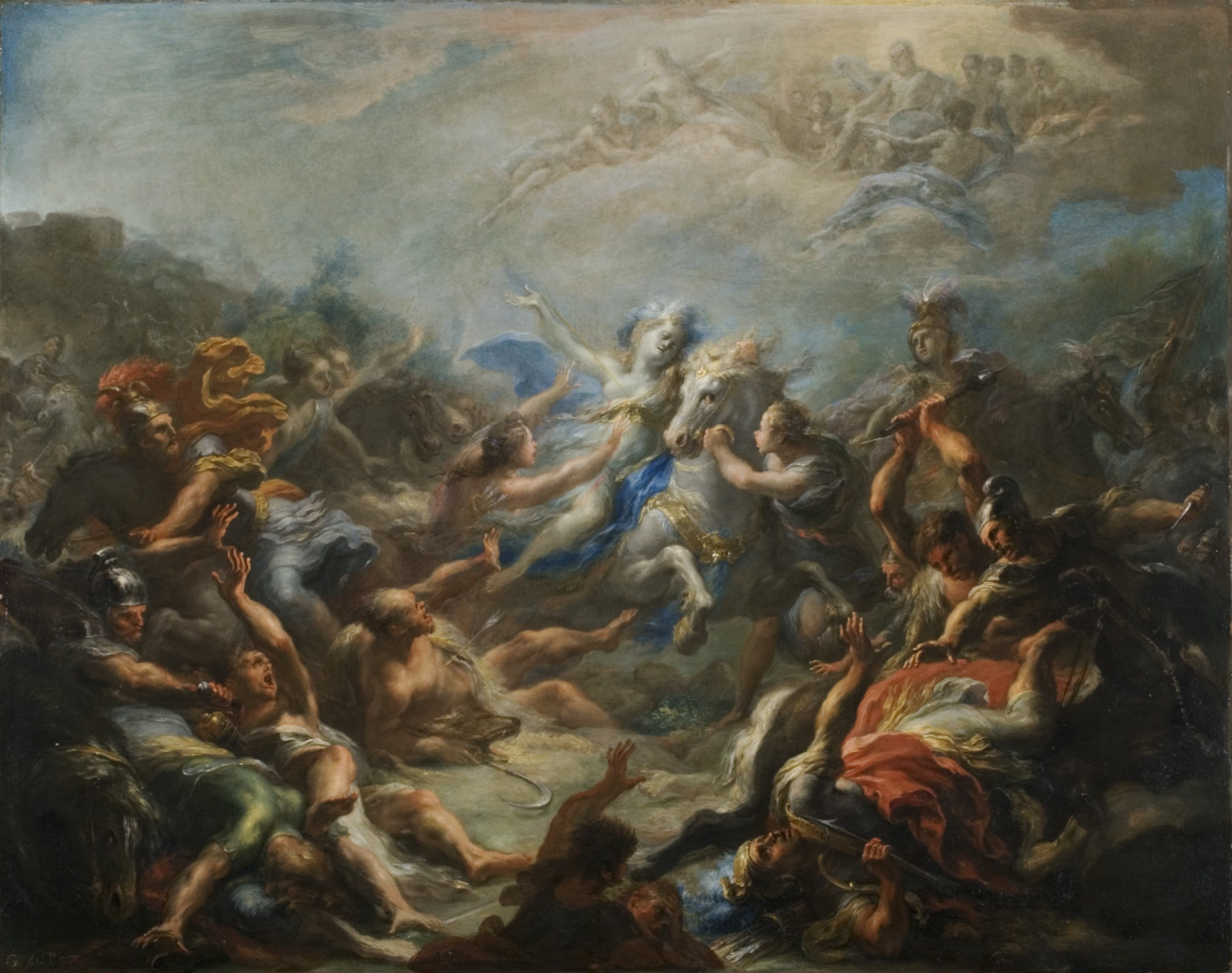
Camillia at War, Los Angeles County Museum of Art

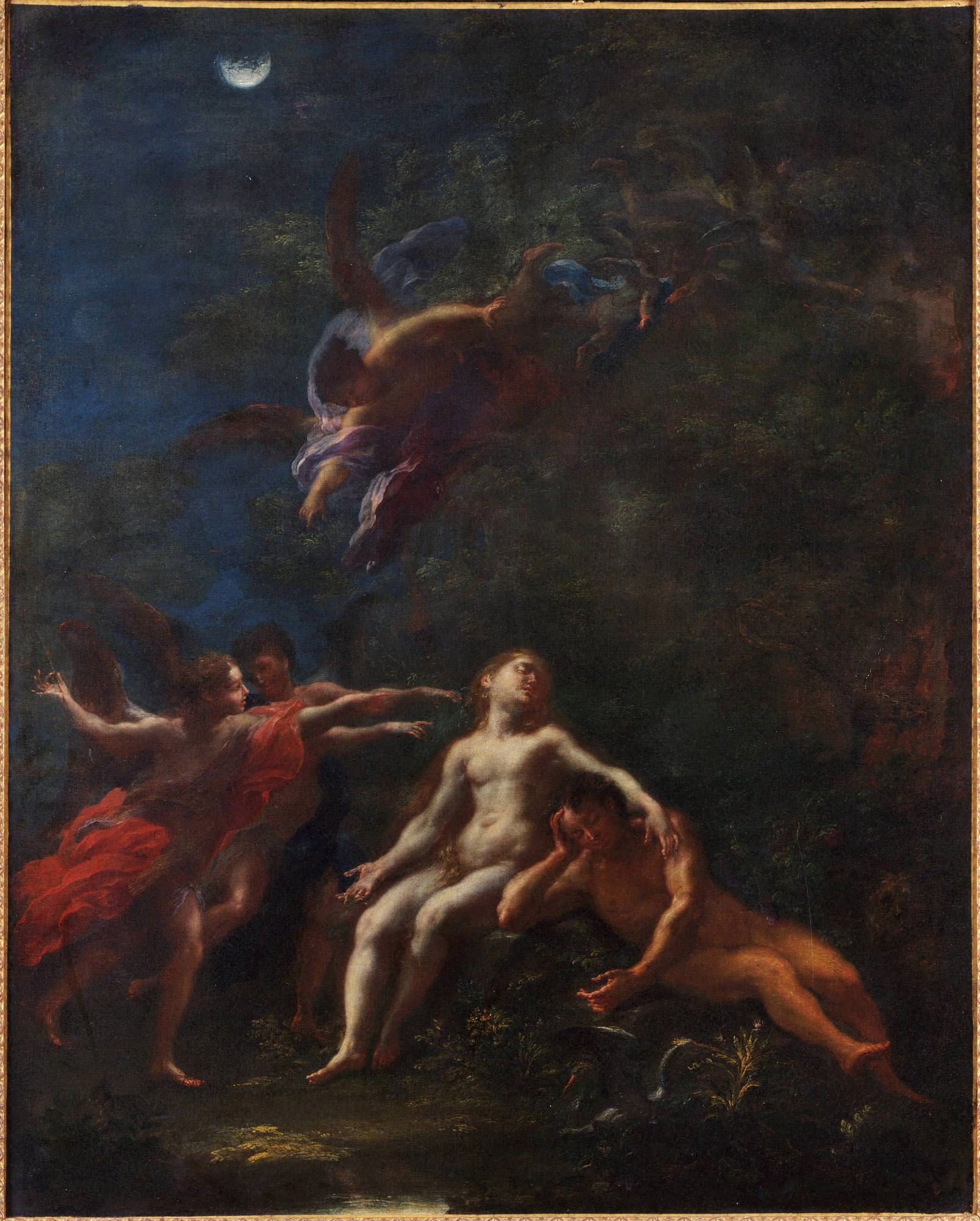
Sleep of Adam and Eve, Princeton University Art Museum

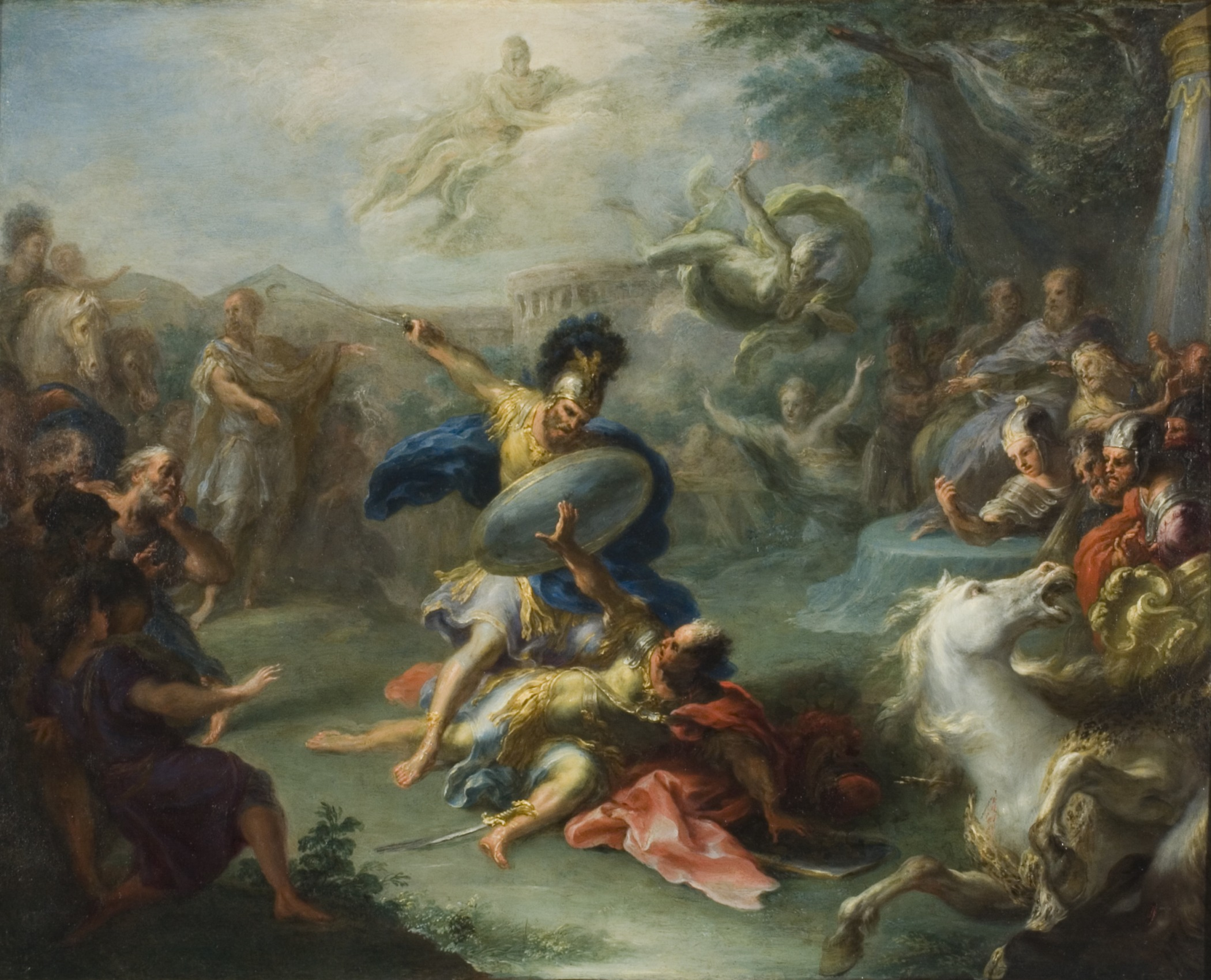
The Fight between Aeneas and King Turnus, Los Angeles County Museum of Art

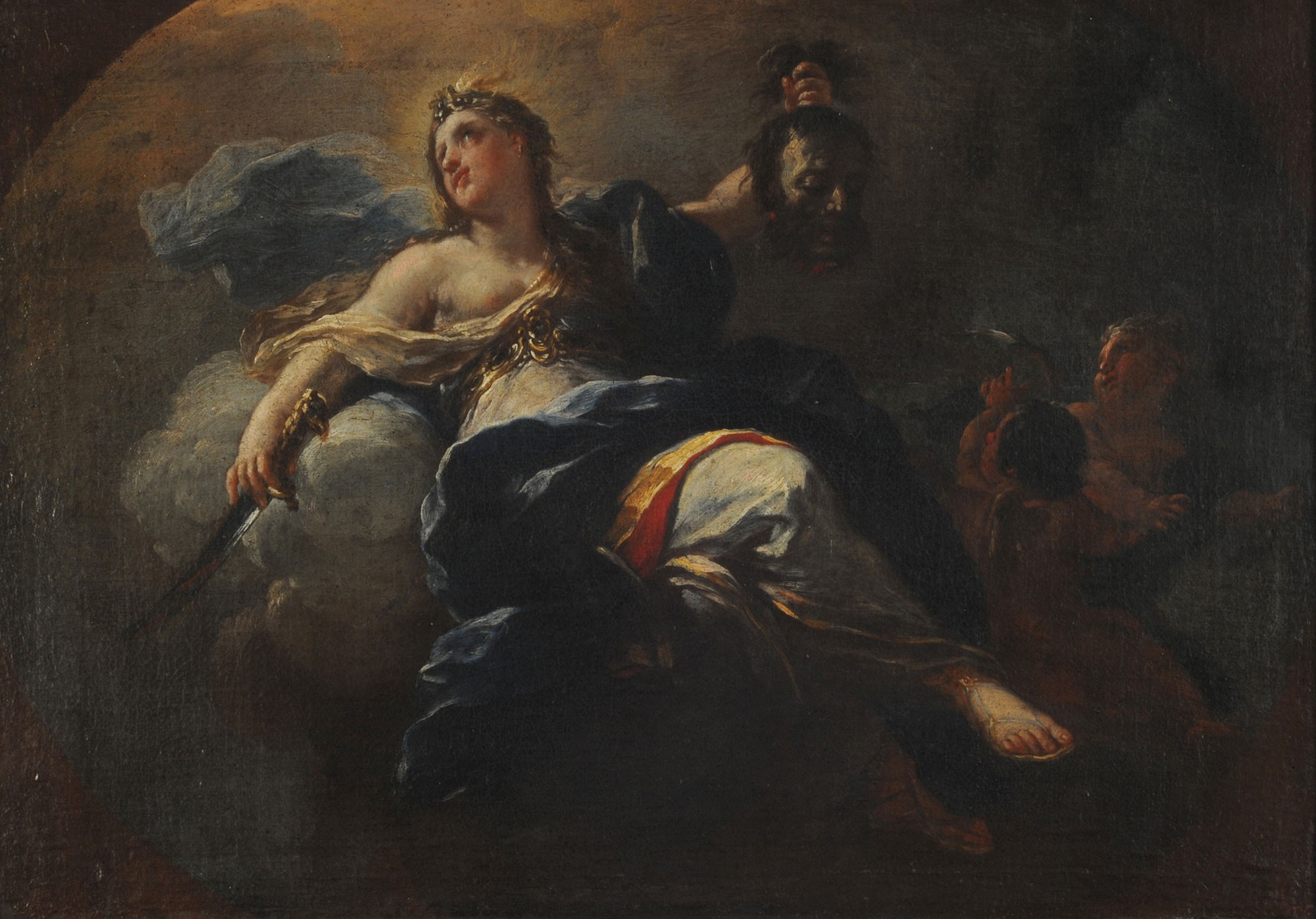
Apoteosis of Judith, Museo Nacional de Bellas Artes, Buenos Aires

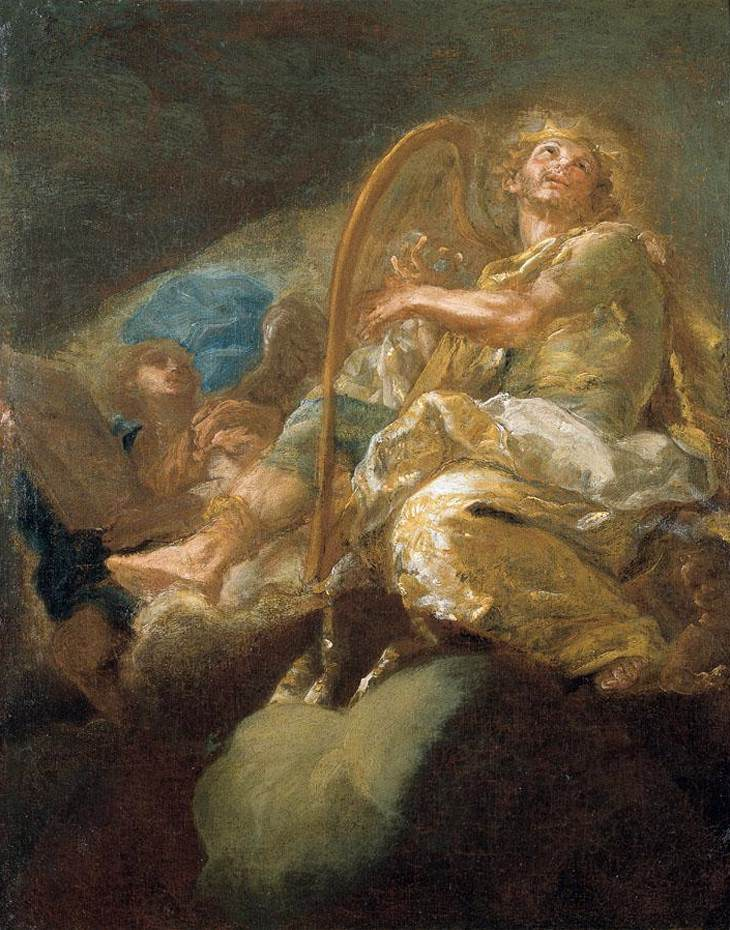
King David Playing the Harp, priv. col.

== Bibliography ==
- Picone, Marina (1957). "Per la conoscenza del pittore Giacomo del Pò". Bollettino d'Arte. 42: 163–72, 309–16.
