= Pietro del Pò =

Italian Baroque painter, engraver and draughtsman (1616–1692)

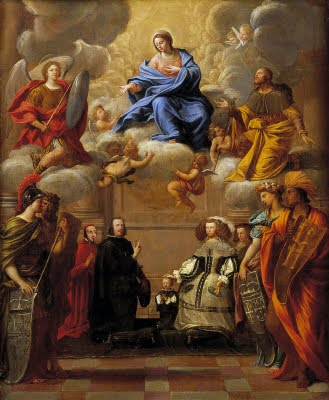
Apotheosis of the Virgin by Pietro del Pò, Toledo Cathedral

Pietro del Pò (1616 – 22 July 1692), also spelled del Po, was an Italian painter, engraver, and draughtsman of the Baroque. He was more distinguished as an engraver than as a painter.

== Early life ==
Pietro was born in Palermo in 1616, the son of Francesco Jacopo and Francesca lo Po. He began to draw at a very early age and later began to paint under the guidance of an unknown master. He married Maria Monforti on 12 July 1637 in the parish of Santa Croce in Palermo. After the death of his wife, he moved to Naples in 1644, perhaps inspired by the need for a more stimulating environment. Naples was in fact a lively artistic center, dominated by the presence of such artists as Jusepe de Ribera, Domenichino and Giovanni Lanfranco; the latter artists had come from Rome. It was indeed this classicist style that provided an interest for Del Pò. The sources indicate that he was a student of Domenichino, but direct contact with the Bolognese artist is now disputed. Rather, it seems probable that he studied with Lanfranco between 1644 and 1646. During those same years he came into contact with artists such as Ribera, Francesco Vaccaro, Massimo Stanzione, and Charles Mellin.

Here, he was married for a second time, to the widow Maffei, Porzia Campagna (or Compagna).

== Rome ==
In 1647, Pietro and his family moved to Rome in order to be near Lanfranco, who had just returned to the capital and for whom Del Pò had become “his most useful assistant”. In 1649 his daughter Teresa, who later also became an engraver and painter.

Between 1651 and 1652 Del Pò lived on Via Margutta, the artists' quarter, where he met Jean Dughet, for whom he produced several etchings after subjects by Nicolas Poussin. In fact, it seems that Poussin assigned to Dughet the task of reproducing his paintings in etchings, and later dedicated them to his most important patrons. De Domenici believed that Pietro del Pò knew Poussin personally.

In 1652 he was admitted to the Virtuosi al Pantheon. He also became a member of the Academy of St. Luke that year, where he later served as lecturer in anatomy and perspective, and, following the death of Orfeo Boselli, Del Pò was elected its president in 1668 but refused the post. Also in 1652, his son Giacomo was born who also became a well known painter and, like his sister Teresa, a member of the Academy of St. Luke. A. Bertolotti published an undated document belonging certainly to Del Pò’s Roman period, which represents Del Pò’s plea to the governor of Rome to absolve him of the accusations of cannibalism and silver theft from the church of Saint Peter's Basilica. These accusations were made by his creditors and damaged his reputation and his business.

According to Pascoli, Pietro succeeded in the Roman artistic environment, primarily because of the esteem and patronage of several influential Spaniards, including the ambassador, who recommended Del Pò to his successor when he returned to Spain.

== Second period in Naples ==
In March 1683 the painter and his family returned to Naples and remained there until Pietro’s death on 22 July 1692, with the exception of a brief stay in Palermo. The artistic production of Pietro del Pò was probably vast, but it is difficult today for us to compile his catalogue. The sources mention numerous works without, however, supplying further information. Perez Sanchez attempted an initial catalogue, which remains the primary source for the artist. Sixteen small paintings on copper illustrating scenes from the life of the Virgin, now in the cathedral of Toledo, are among his most notable works. Two paintings, “Saint Leocadia” and “Saint Ildelfonso” and a third entitled “The Virgin Adored by the Regents of Spain with Saints Michael and Santiago” are also in the cathedral of Toledo. However, the painting most frequently mentioned in the sources, “Saint Leo,” executed for the church of Santa Maria di Constantinopoli in Rome, where it remained until 1700, is now lost.

The works that Del Pò produced in Naples include twelve paintings with the scene from the Passion of Christ and several frescoes, now destroyed, representing the Resurrection, Pentecost, and Assumption, all painted for the church of Santa Barbara in Castel Nuovo. Pietro painted primarily religious subjects, and less frequently, profane historical and mythological themes. His compositions and his female figure types reveal the influence of Domenichino’s classicism and of Bolognese art, and the influence of Charles Mellin, with whom Del Pò was in close contact, has been recently noted. Scholars point out Pietro’s precise and detailed ability as a draftsman more often than his ability as a colorist, and in fact he appears to have remained tied to his early classical training without responding to the new trends in the Roman Baroque.

He perhaps attained his most original results as a draftsman, but his activity in this field is difficult to define. It seems that Pietro considered drawing an independent art and not merely a preliminary stage for etchings. However, only after the many anonymous drawings and those dubiously attributed to Domenichino and others in the circle have been correctly attributed, will it be possible to assess his skill in this area.

== Artistic assessment ==
Del Pò is best known as an etcher who reproduced the paintings of the most important seventeenth-century artists. His choice of subjects reveals a preference for classical themes, and he reproduced primarily the works of Domenichino, Nicolas Poussin, Lanfranco and the Carracci. In addition, requests for his etchings came from abroad, as evidenced by several prints published in Paris by Bertrand and Coypel. Led by Bartsch, most scholars discuss Del Pò’s work favourably and point out his talent as a draftsman.

Although the artist often retouched selected details of his etchings with burin, the different states do not reveal outstanding variations, and often the only changed are made by the publishers who added their addresses, dedications, or other modifications to the plates.

=== List of prints ===
Among his prints are:

- St. John in the Wilderness after Annibale Carracci
- The Lamentation of the Virgin with two Angels after Annibale Carracci
- The Birth of the Virgin
- The Nativity
- The Adoration of the Shepherds
- The Presentation in the Temple
- The Baptism of Christ
- The Crown of Thorns
- The Lamentation of the Virgin and St John
- Noli Me Tangere
- St Andrew
- The Benedict Praying in the Desert
- The Virgin Appearing to St Frances of Rome
- Woman of Canaan before Christ after the same.
- Virgin seated on a Throne with the Infant, and a choir of Angels after Domenichino.
- The four Cardinal Virtues, with their attributes after the same.
- St. Jerome kneeling with an Angel after the same.
- The Annunciation after Nicolas Poussin.
- The Flight into Egypt after the same.

== Scholarship on Del Pò ==
The artistic personality of Pietro Del Pò has been defined only partially by the research of U. Prota-Giurleo and A. Perez Sanchez. These two scholars clarified and corrected the general and often imprecise scholarship of De Dominici and Pascoli.

== Bibliography ==
- Bryan, Michael (1886). Robert Edmund Graves (ed.). Dictionary of Painters and Engravers, Biographical and Critical. Vol. I: A-K. London: George Bell and Sons. pp. 392–393.
- The Illustrated Bartsch, 45 Commentary (Le Peintre-Graveur 20 [Part 2]), Italian Masters of the Seventeenth Century, Edited by Paolo Bellini and Richard W. Wallace, (Texts for P. Del Pò and T. Del Pò compiled by Donata Minonzio, Texts for G. Gimignani, C. Rainaldi, G. Dughet, and B. Manini compiled by Angelo Ottolini), ABARIS BOOKS A Woodner Foundation Company, 4510 Pietro Del Pò – pages 229-230.
