= Francesco di Simone da Santacroce =

Italian painter

Francesco di Simone da Santacroce or Santa Croce (born in Santa Croce, frazione of San Pellegrino Terme, near Bergamo c. 1470–1475 and died Venice, 1508) was an Italian painter, active mainly in a Renaissance style. He was influenced by Giovanni Bellini.

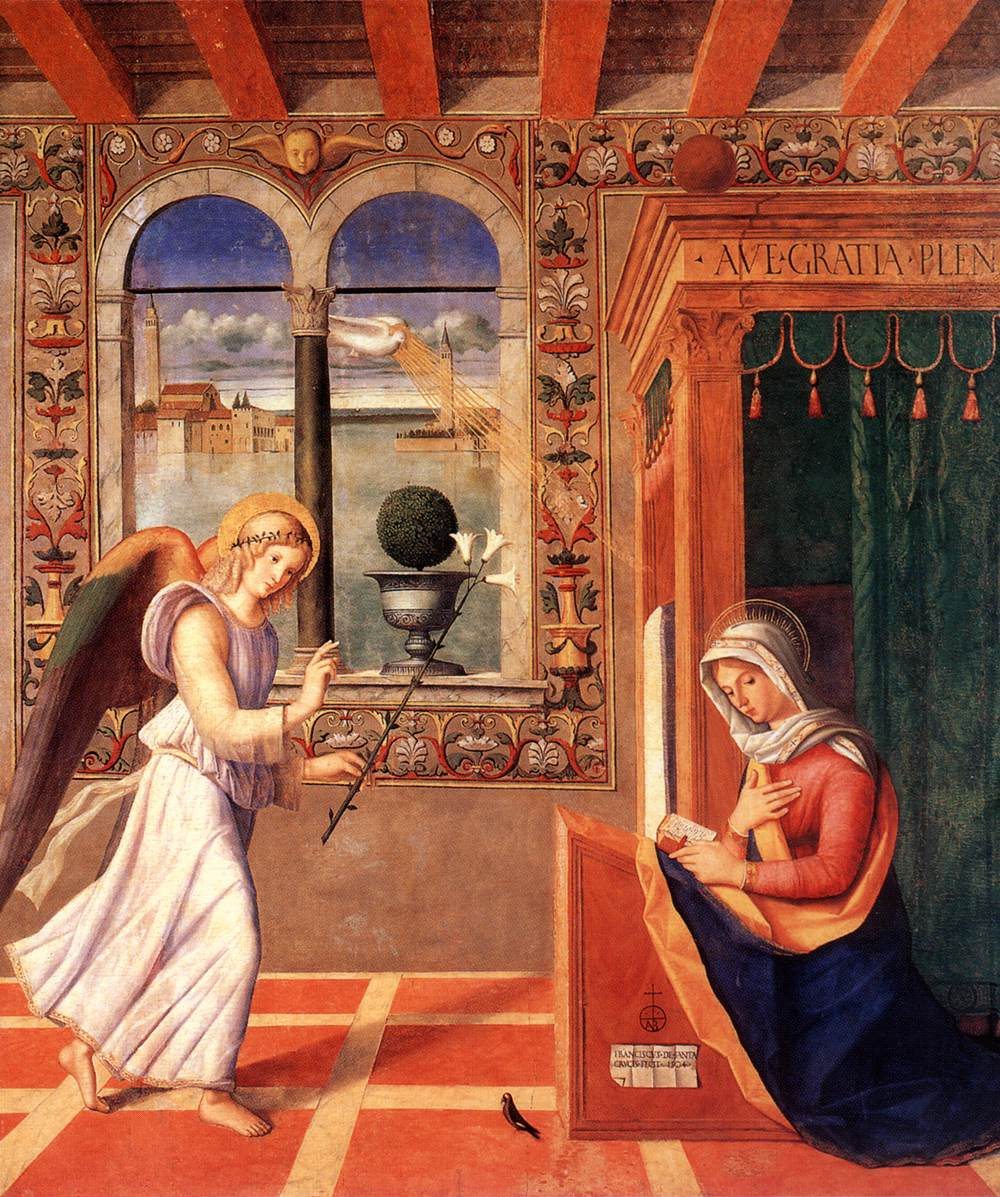
Annunciation (1504), Pinacoteca Carrara, Bergamo.

== Biography ==
He is best known for founding a studio that trained Francesco Rizzo, who inherited the studio after his master's demise, and later Palma il Vecchio and Andrea Previtali. His main pupil Francesco Rizzo is also sometimes known as Francesco da Santacroce. To confuse names further, a Francesco di Simone, was putatively active in the early 15th century in Naples, a pupil of Simone Napoletano and colleague of Colantonio del Fiore. Finally Simone Ferrucci is a Quattrocento sculptor also known as Francesco di Simone Ferrucci.
