= Teresa del Pò =

Italian artist (1649–1716)

- Born: August 20, 1649; Rome, Papal States
- Died: August 5, 1716 (aged 66); Naples, Kingdom of Naples
- Known for: Painting
- Movement: Baroque

Teresa del Pò (1649–1716), also spelled del Po, was an Italian painter and engraver of the late Baroque.

== Life ==
She was born in Rome in 1649, the daughter of Pietro del Pò. She was his second daughter of this name. An earlier Teresa, baptised in Naples in 1646, must have died in infancy.

She is said to have painted in oil and in miniature, and etched a few plates in the style of her father; they included Susannah and the Elders, after Carracci. She became a member of the Accademia di San Luca in Rome, and died in Naples in 1716.
