= Francesco Rizzo da Santacroce =

Italian painter

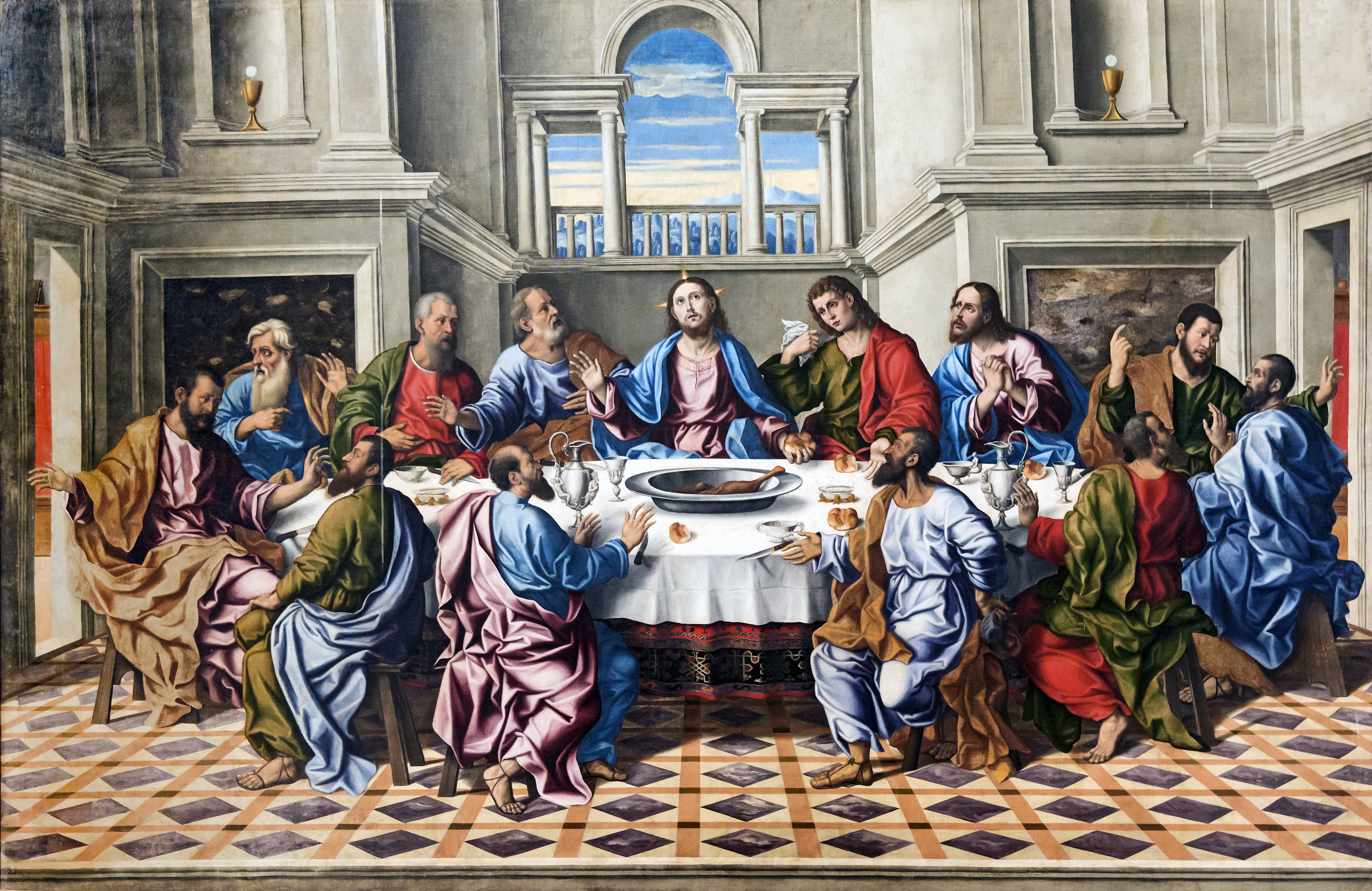
The Last Supper by Francesco Rizzo da Santacroce

Francesco Rizzo da Santacroce, also known as simply Francesco da Santacroce or Francesco di Bernardo de' Vecchi Da Santa Croce (active 1507 – 1545) was an Italian painter of the Renaissance period, active mainly in Bergamo and Venice.

== Biography ==
He initially trained with Francesco di Simone da Santacroce, and ultimately inherited this master's studio. He was later a pupil of, or influenced by, Giovanni Bellini or Vittore Carpaccio. He was born in the Sestiere of Santa Croce in Venice, or his family came from the hamlet of Santa Croce in Bergamo.

In 1507, he painted an Altarpiece depicting St Peter for the parish church of Lerina. By 1519, he was working in Venice, where he painted for San Cristoforo, the church of the Dominicans in the Zattere, San Francesco della Vigna (Last Supper), and Santa Maria degli Angeli, Murano (Virgin and St Jerome and Jeremiah moved to San Pietro). He also painted an altarpiece for the parish church of Chirignago.

Girolamo and Pietro Paolo Rizzo were also painters and part of the same family.
