= Gaetano Martoriello =

Italian painter

Gaetano Martoriello (c. 1680–1733) was an Italian painter of the late-Baroque period, active in his natal city of Naples. He painted mainly marine vedute and landscapes. He initially trained under Giacomo del Po, but desiring to paint landscapes he worked under Nicola Massaro, who claimed to have trained under Salvatore Rosa. He is also said to have worked under Francesco Solimena, after the later painter rebuked Martoriello for criticizing some paintings by the German landscape artist, Francesco Joachim Beich.
