= Girolamo Colleoni =

Italian painter

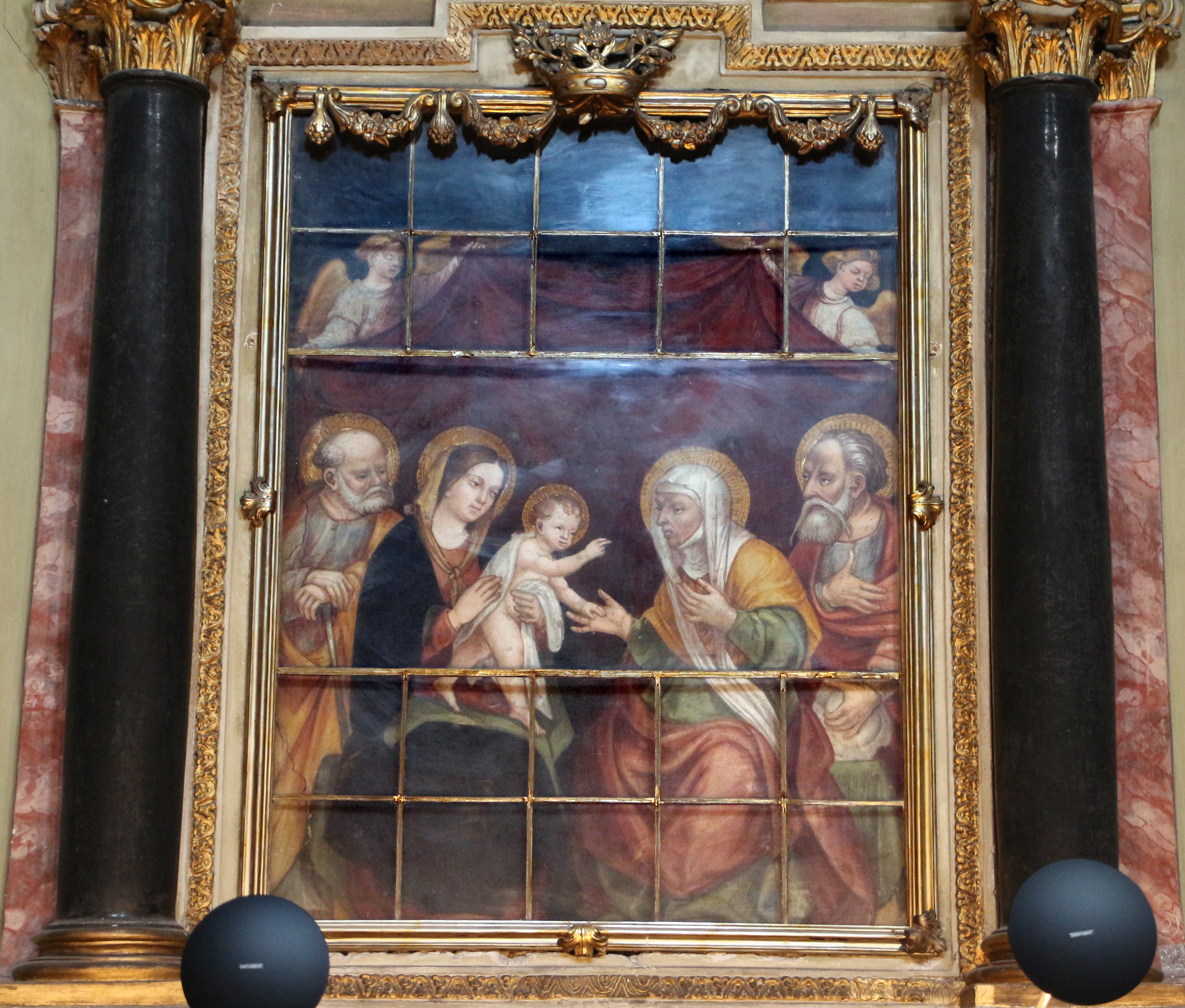
Holy Family with Saints Anne and Joachim

Girolamo Colleoni (c. 1500 – after 1555) was an Italian painter of the Renaissance period. He was born in Bergamo, and was active there till 1555, but they left for Spain to work for the Spanish King. He is known for a Marriage of Saint Catherine painted in the style of Titian.

== Sources ==
- Boni, Filippo de' (1852). Biografia degli artisti ovvero dizionario della vita e delle opere dei pittori, degli scultori, degli intagliatori, dei tipografi e dei musici di ogni nazione che fiorirono da'tempi più remoti sino á nostri giorni. Seconda Edizione.. Venice; Googlebooks: Presso Andrea Santini e Figlio. p. 236.
