= Bartolomeo Bettera =

Italian painter

Bartolomeo Bettera (Bergamo, 1639 - Milan, after 1688) was an Italian painter, mainly depicting still lifes with musical instruments. He trained and worked under or with Evaristo Baschenis, painting the same subject matter. Works can be seen in Ringling Museum of Art, National Gallery of Slovenia, and Gallery of the Accademia Carrara in Bergamo.

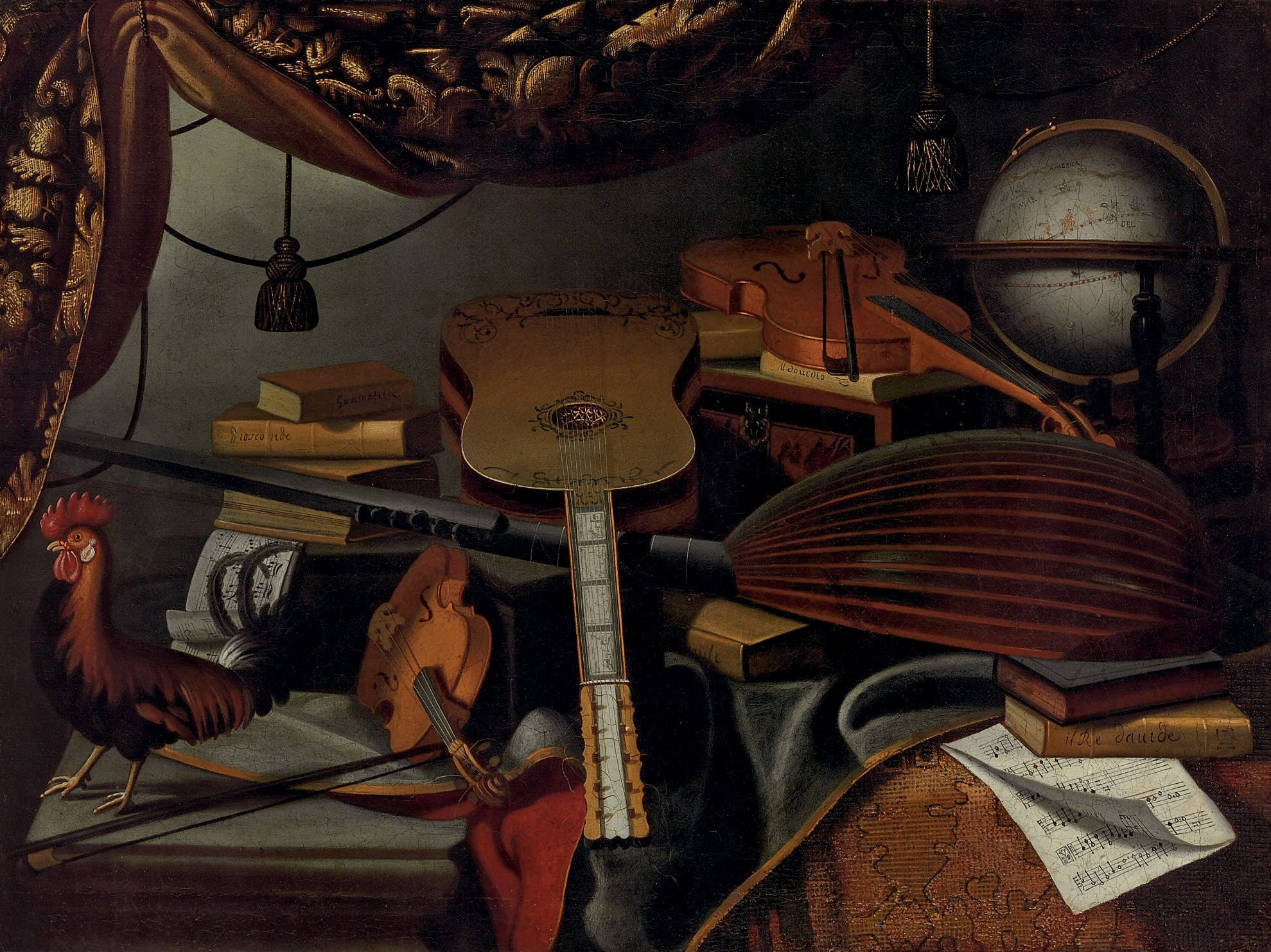
Still Life with Musical Instruments.
