= Luigi Lanza =

Italian painter (1860–1913)

Luigi Lanza (1860 – after 1913) was an Italian painter, depicting mainly vedute, in oil and watercolors.

== Biography ==
Born in Venice, he was a brother of the painter Giovanni Lanza. He studied at the Accademia of Venice. He painted vedute mostly of his native Venice, but also traveled through Southern Italy. Lanza's works included Shore at Venice, Al lido, and Sulla laguna. At Turin, in 1884, he exhibited Rivo Ca Bernardo. In Venice and Turin in 1887 he exhibited, a Veduta of the Laguna, among others. At the 1887 Promotrice of Florence, he exhibited a painting: Fondamenta dello Misericordia. His Veduta di Castel dell'Ovo a Napoli is at Accademia Carrara in Bergamo.
