= Marzio Masturzo =

Italian painter

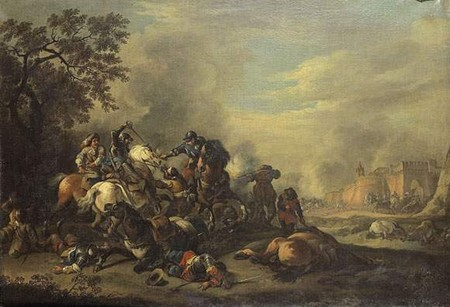
- Scène de Bataille by Marzio Masturzo
- Born: 17th century
- Style: Baroque

Marzio Masturzo (fl. 17th century) was an Italian Baroque painter, active near his natal city of Naples. He was a pupil of Paolo Greco, then, along with Salvatore Rosa, a fellow-pupil of Aniello Falcone. Like Falcone, he often painted battle scenes. He appears to have joined during the Masaniello revolt, a loose fraternity of artists called the Compagnia della morte involved in the rebellion.
