= Girolamo da Santacroce =

Italian painter

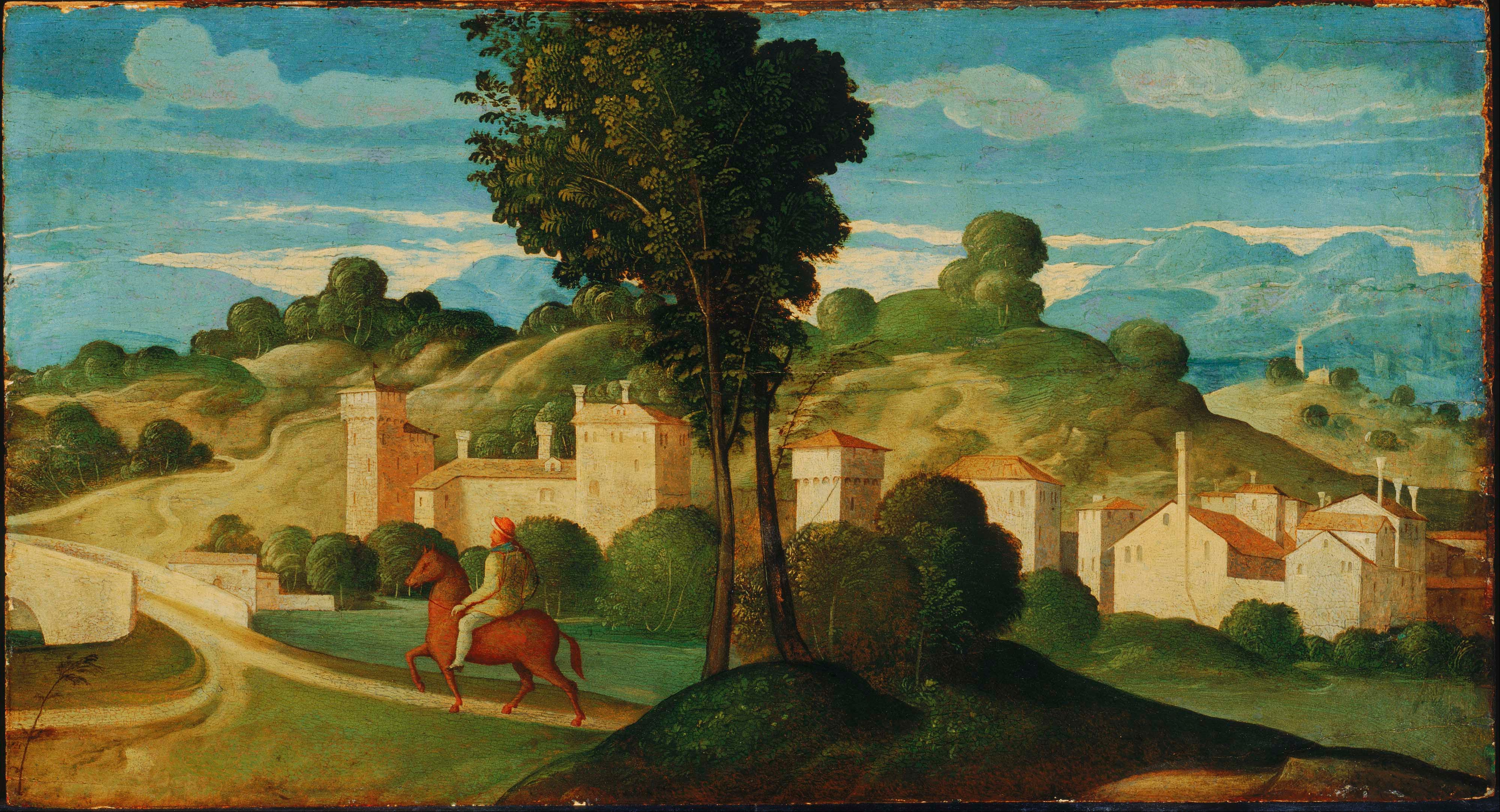
Landscape with Rider

Girolamo da Santacroce (c. 1480/85 – c. 1556) was a 16th-century Italian painter of the Renaissance period, active mainly in Venice and the Venetian mainland.

== Life and work ==
Girolamo da Santacroce was born in Bergamo, Italy. He became in Venice a pupil of the painter Gentile Bellini. On Gentile's death in 1507, Santacroce was left in Gentile's will half of the Oriental drawings made be Gentile. Santacroce then most likely worked as an assistant in the workshops of Giovanni Bellini and Cima da Conegliano.

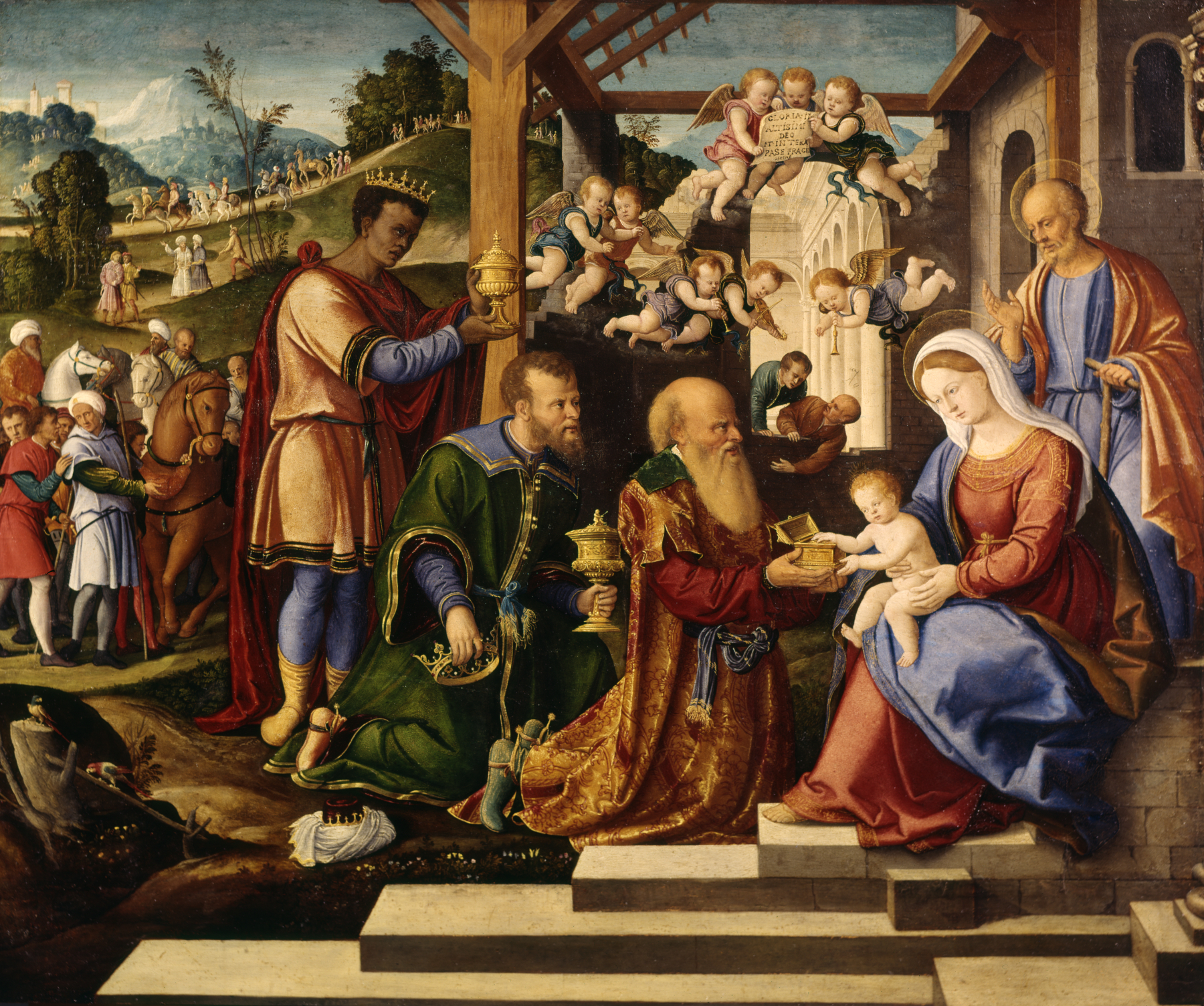
Adoration of the Three Kings, circa 1525–1530

He was a prolific artist and many of his works are signed and dated. He produced many copies after the works of the leading Venetian masters. His work shows the influence of Titian and Palma Vecchio.

He is represented at the Musei Civici of Vicenza by a Madonna con il Bambino tra i santi Cosma e Damiano(?) It is unclear if he is related to a sculptor named Girolamo Santacroce in Naples.

== Gallery ==
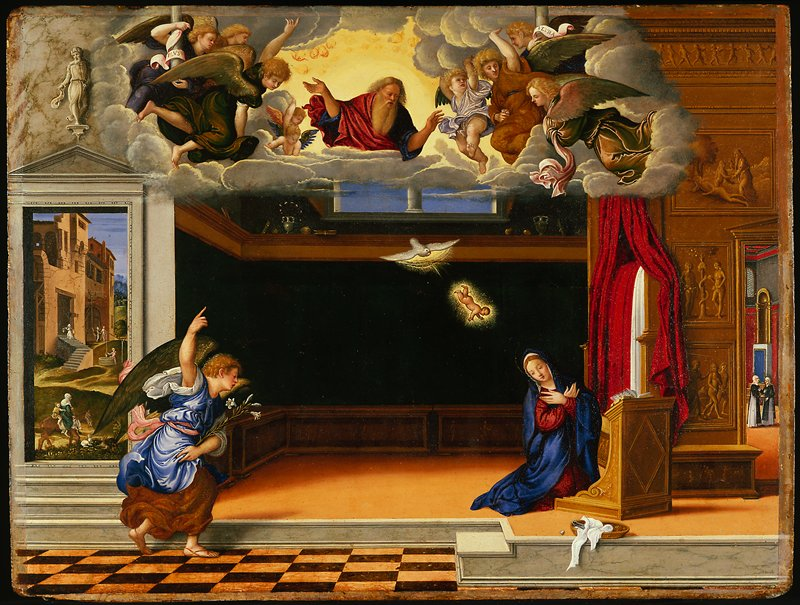
The Annunciation, circa 1540

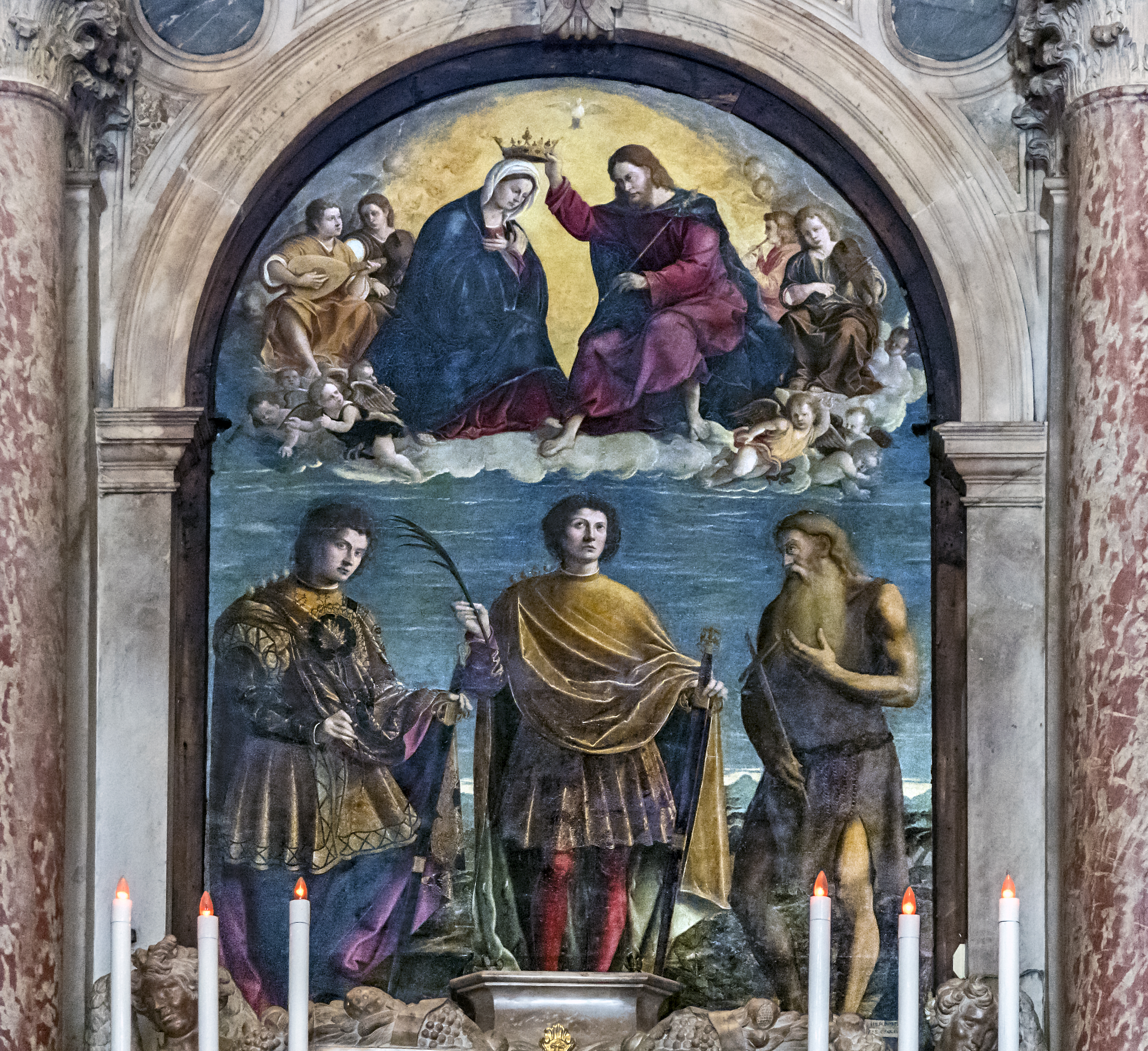
Coronation of the Virgin with Saints Vitus, Julian the Hospitaller, and Hieronymus

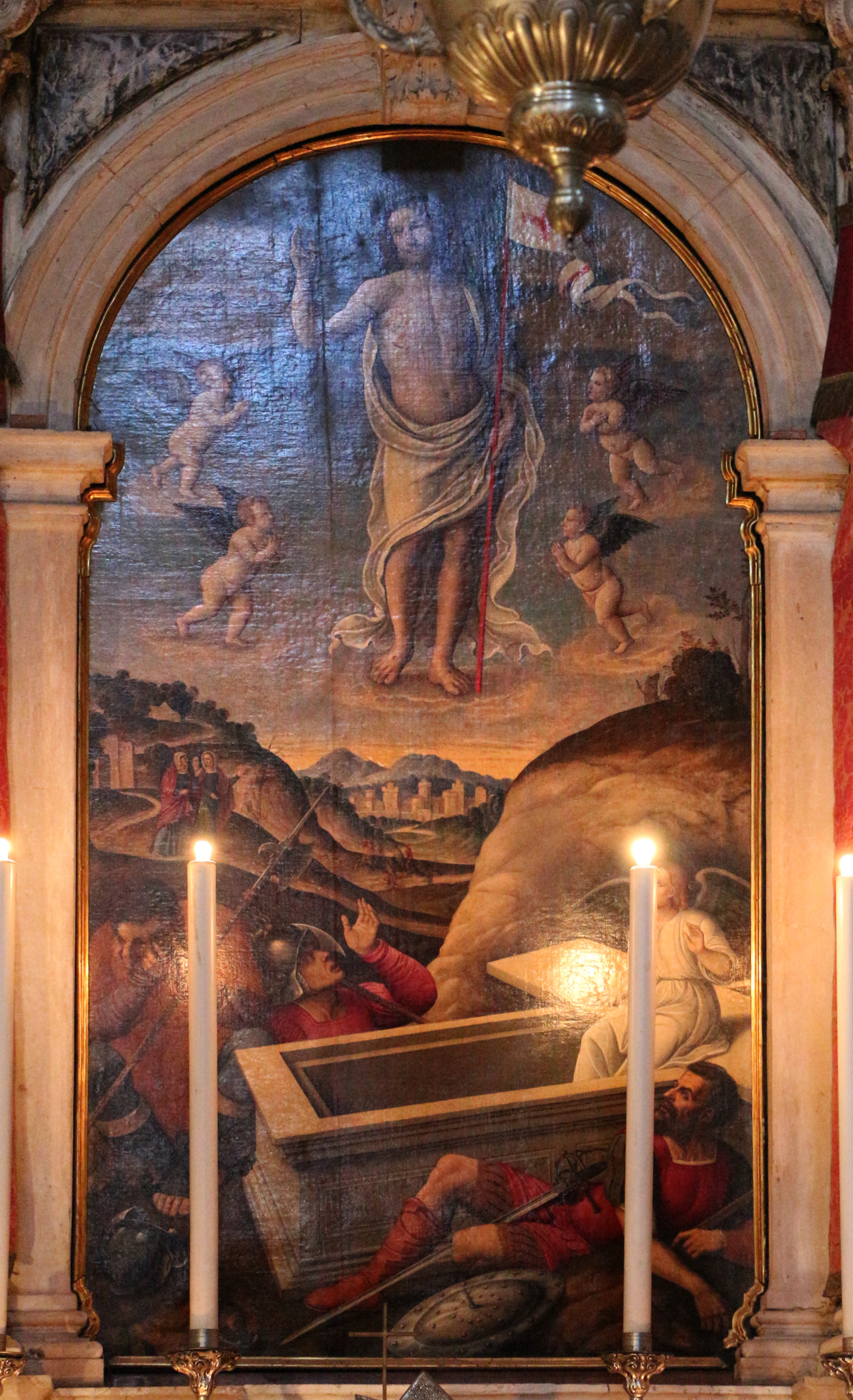
Resurrection

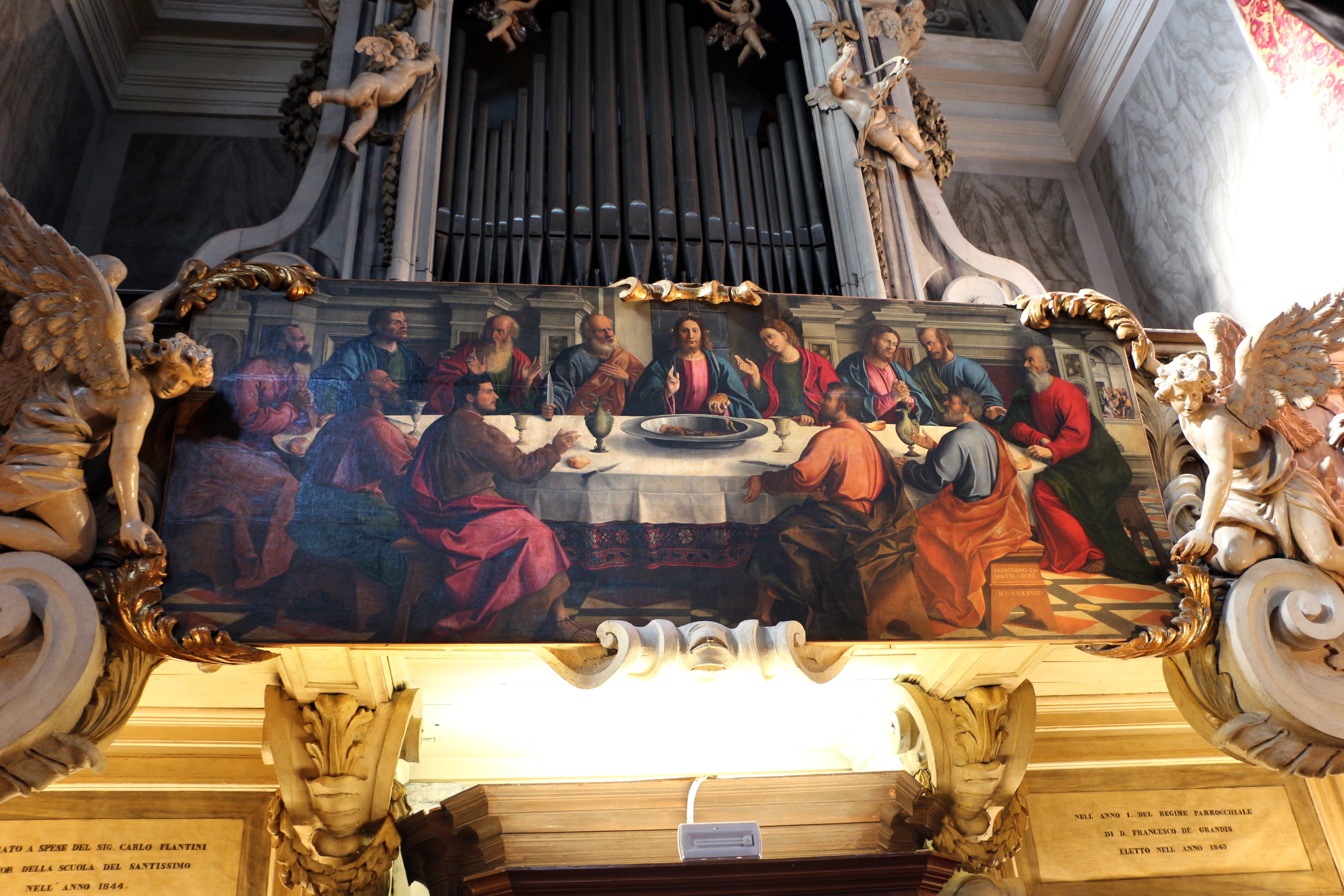
Last Supper, 1549

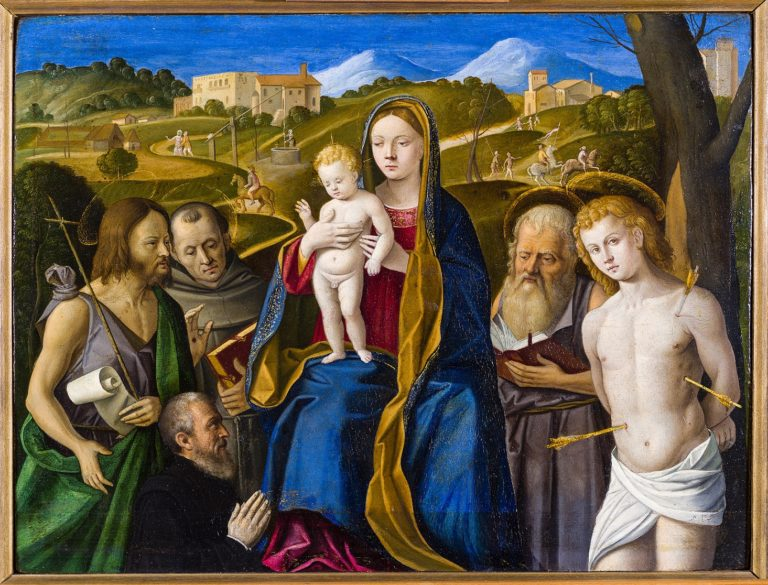
Madonna and Child with the Donor among Saints John the Baptist, Francis, Hieronymus, and Sebastian

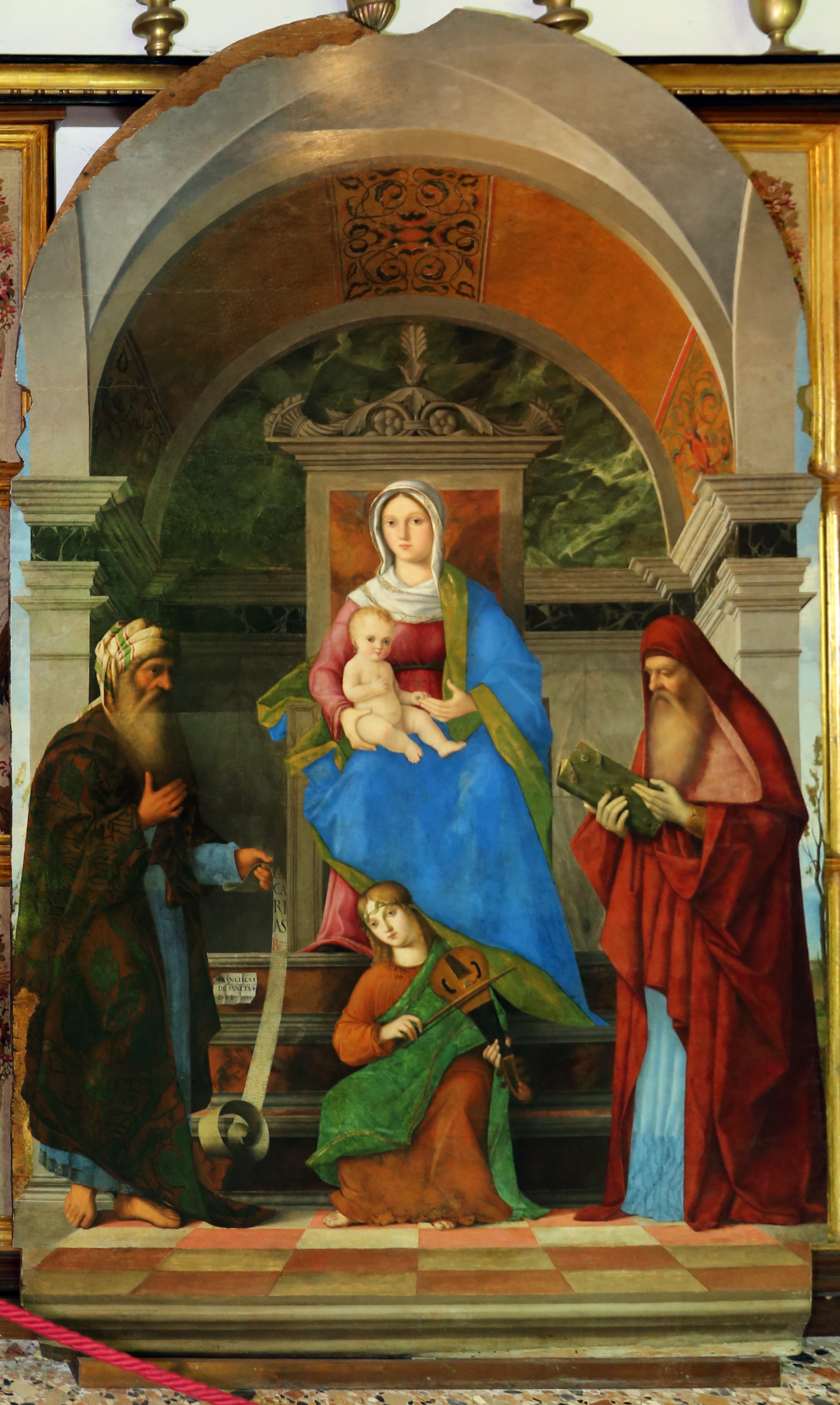
Madonna Enthroned with Child between Saints Hieronymus and Zacharias, 1507

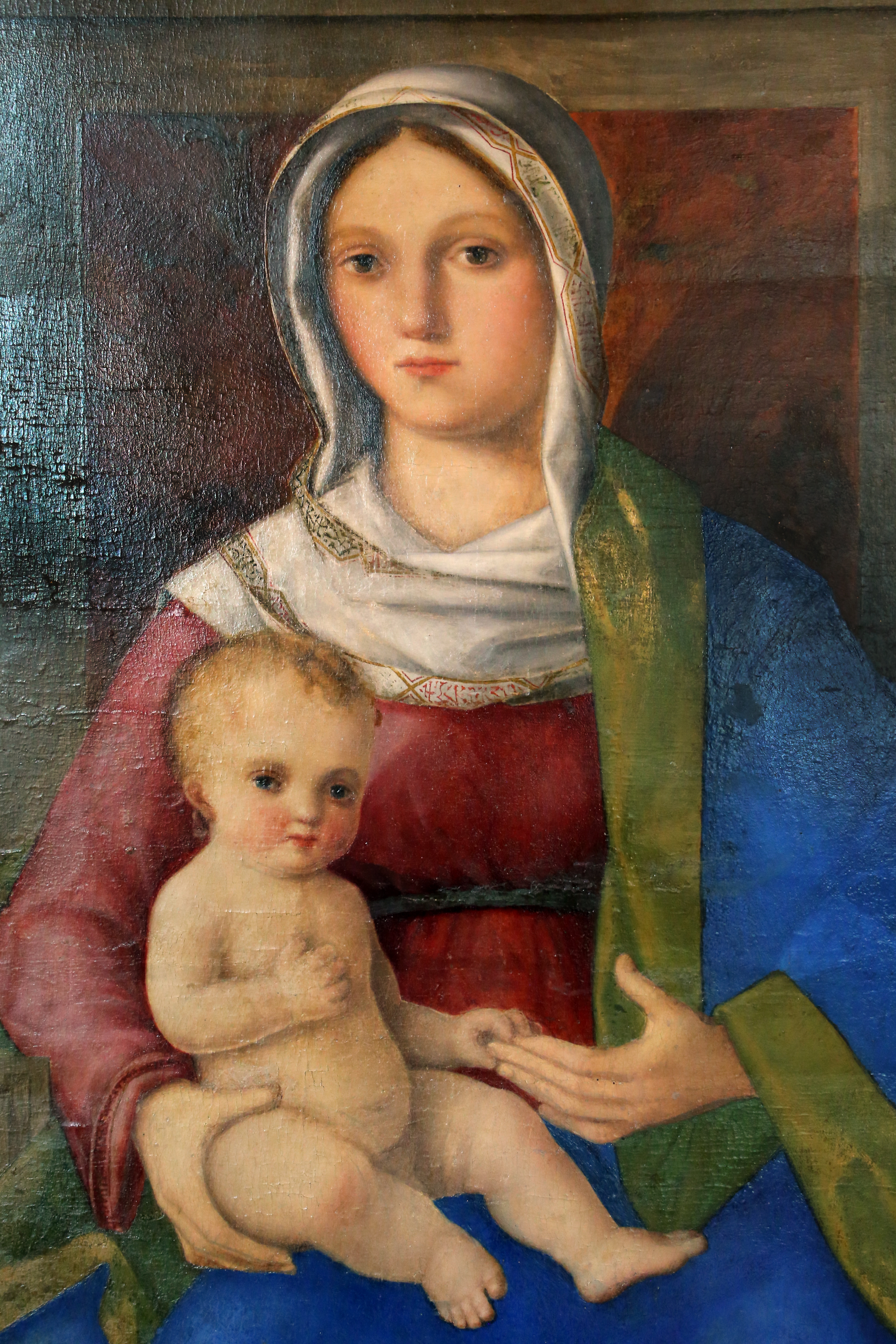
Madonna Enthroned with Child detail

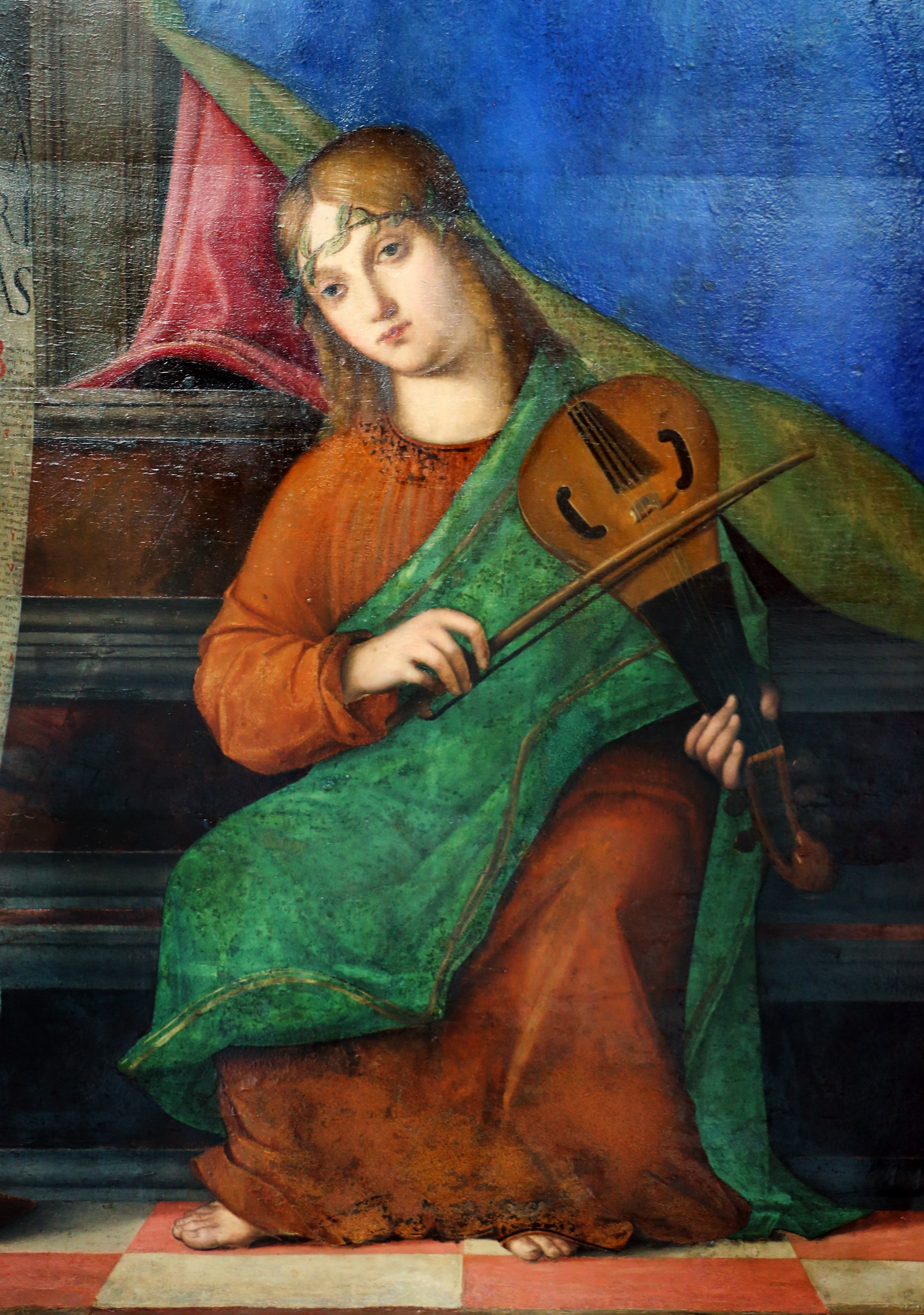
Madonna Enthroned with Child detail

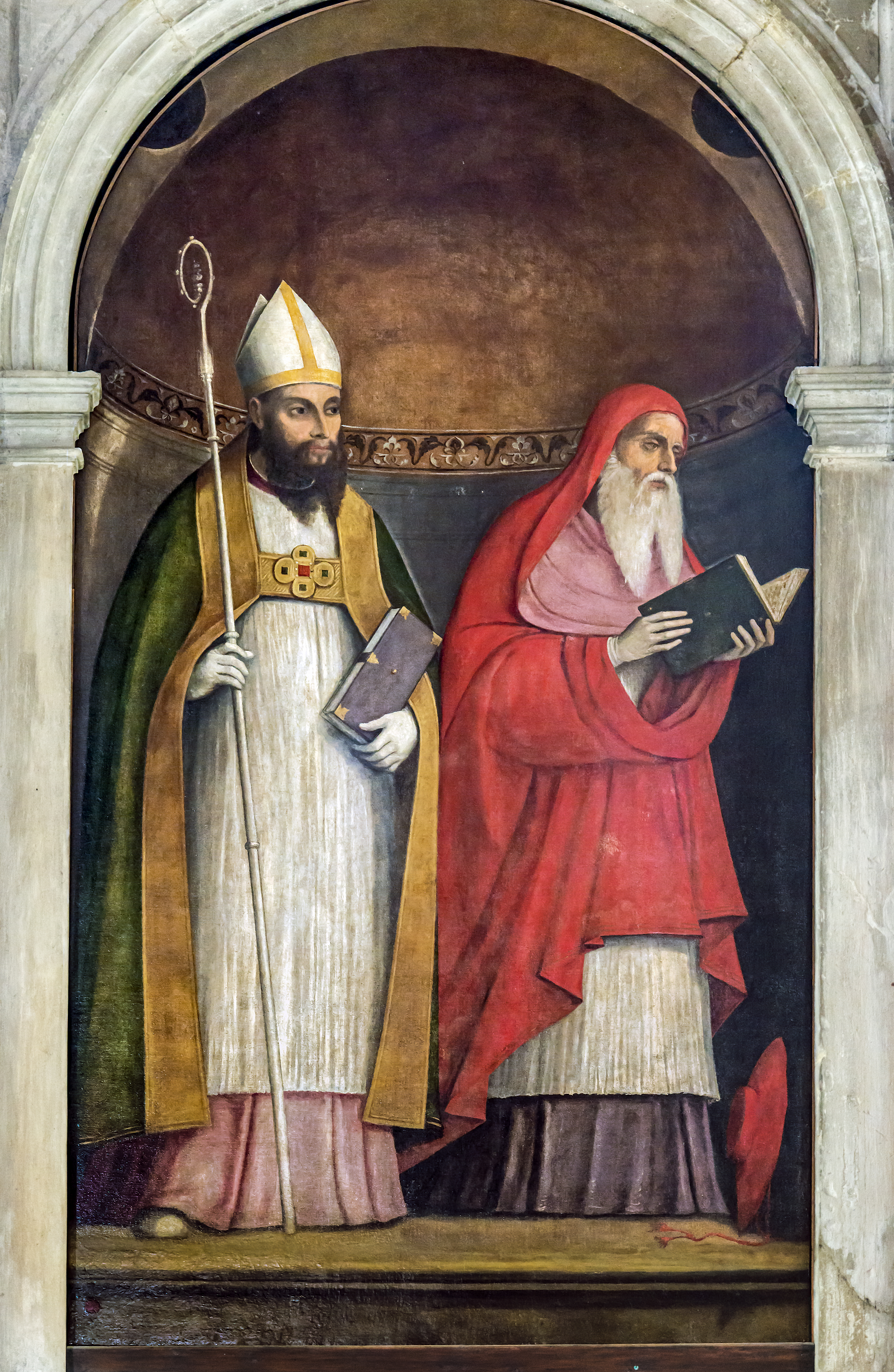
St. Jerome and St. Augustine, Madonna dell'Orto, (Venice)

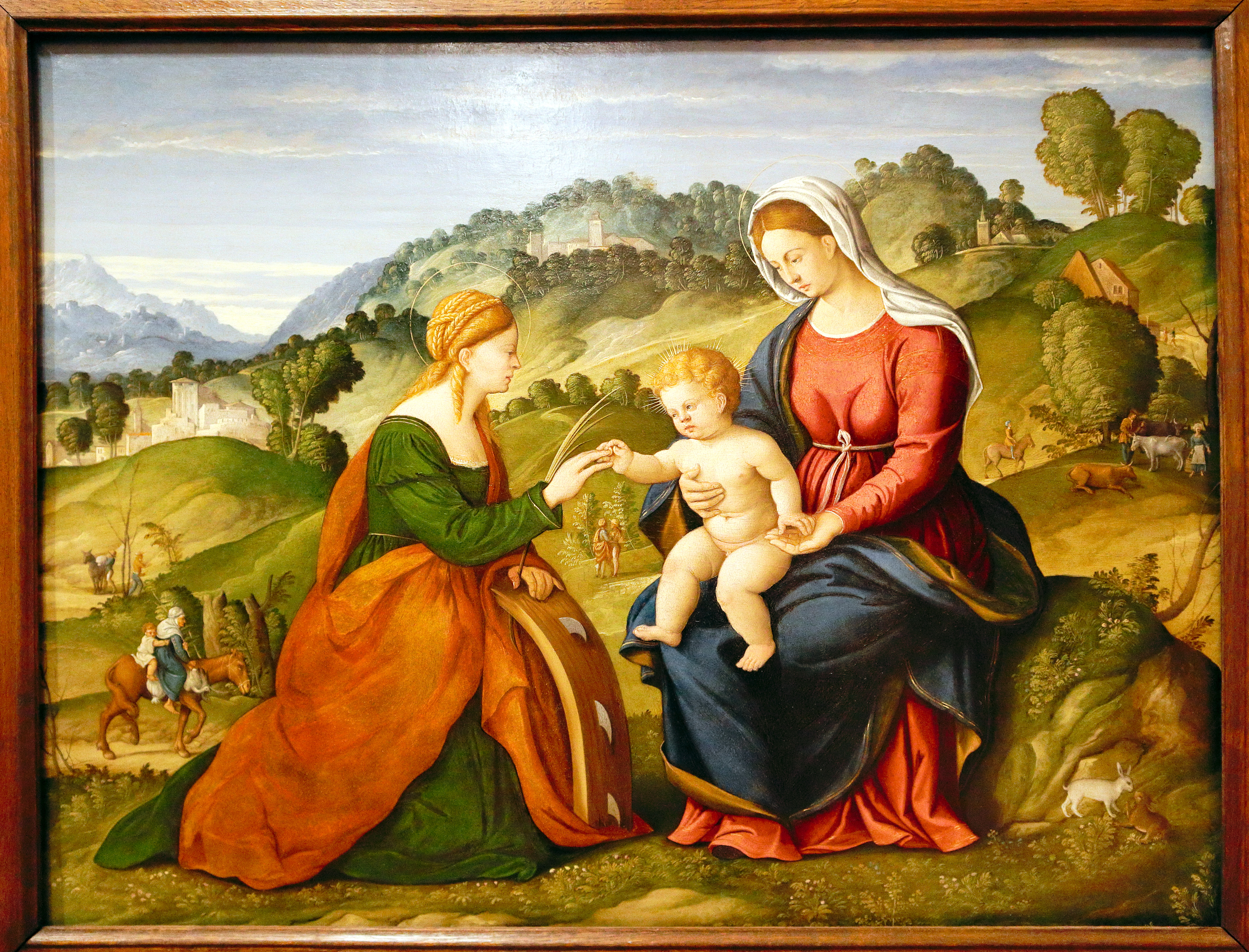
Mystical Marriage of Saint Catherine (Musée Jeanne d'Aboville)

== Secondary sources ==
- Farquhar, Maria (1855). Ralph Nicholson Wornum (ed.). Biographical catalogue of the principal Italian painters. London: Woodfall & Kinder. pp. 158–9.
- Ludwig, Gustav (1903). "Archivalische Beiträge zur Geschichte der venezianischen Malerei". Jahrbuch der Königlich-preussischen Kunstsammlungen. 24 Band. Weidmannsche Buchhundlung, Berlin: 10–20.
