= Franz Joachim Beich =

German painter

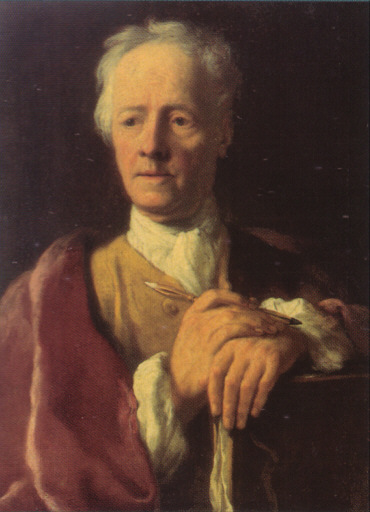
Portrait of Beich, by George Desmarées, 1744

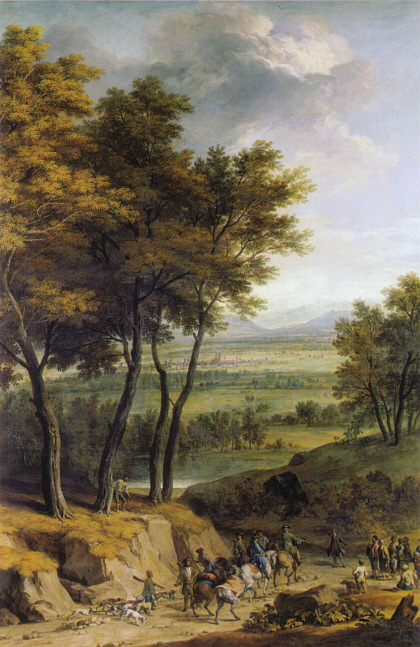
Landscape with view towards Munich, with a hunting party returning home, 1720–1725

Franz Joachim Beich (1666–1748) was a Bavarian painter.

== Life ==
Franz Joachim Beich was born at Ravensburg (in today's Baden-Württemberg), on October 15, 1666. He was the son of Daniel Beich, a painter of little celebrity, from whom he received his instruction in the art.

He excelled in painting landscapes and battles. His best works are in the palaces of the Elector of Bavaria, in whose employment he was for several years; among these are several large pictures of the battles fought in Hungary by the Elector Maximilian Emmanuel.

With the permission of his patron, he visited Italy, and made many drawings from the beautiful views in that country. His landscapes exhibit very pleasing scenery, and he appears to have imitated, in the arrangement of his pictures, the tasteful style of Gaspar Poussin.

He died in Munich on October 16, 1748, aged 82.

== Works ==
The Vienna Gallery has two landscapes by him, and the Munich Gallery has four. The Munich Gallery also has a portrait of the artist by Des Marées, painted in 1744 when he was 78 years old. As an engraver, he has contributed several etchings. We have by him four sets of landscapes, with figures and buildings (amounting together to twenty-six plates), etched with great spirit and facility.
