= San Pietro a Majella =

Church of San Pietro a Majella
- Chiesa di San Pietro a Majella
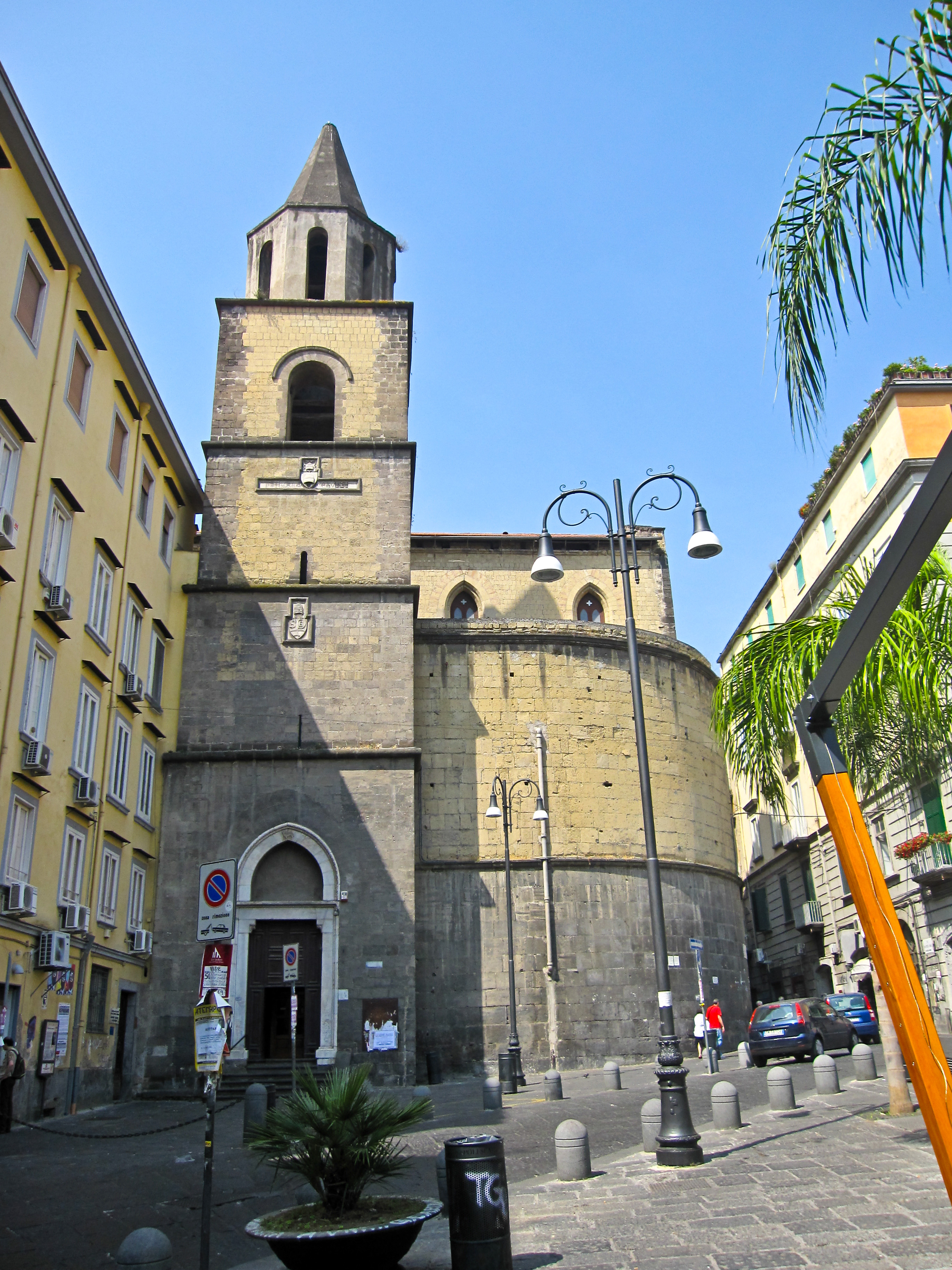
- Side façade with bell.
- Church of San Pietro a Majella
- 40.849518°N 14.252974°E
- Location: Naples; Province of Naples, Campania
- Country: Italy
- Denomination: Roman Catholic

History
- Status: Active

Architecture
- Architectural type: Church
- Style: Gothic architecture

Administration
- Diocese: Roman Catholic Archdiocese of Naples

San Pietro a Majella is a church in Naples, Italy. The term may also refer to the adjacent Naples music conservatory, which occupies the premises of the monastery that used to form a single complex with the church.

The church stands at the western end of Via dei Tribunali, one of the three parallel streets that define the grid of the historic center of Naples; the church is considered one of the most significant examples of Angevin architecture in Naples and was built at the wishes of Giovanni Pipino da Barletta, one of the knights of Charles II of Anjou and the one responsible for destroying the last Saracen colony on the southern peninsula, in Lucera.

San Pietro a Majella was built in the early 14th century in Gotico Angioino style and was named for and dedicated to Pietro Angeleri da Morone, a hermit monk from Maiella (near Sulmona) who became Pope Celestine V in 1294. He was the founder of the Celestine monastic order, which occupied the church until 1799, when monasteries were suppressed by the Neapolitan Republic. After the restoration of the monarchy, the monastery was reopened, but in 1826 was converted to house the San Pietro a Maiella Conservatory, a function it preserves. The church underwent restoration in the 1930s and remains an open and active house of worship.

As was the case with much Angevin architecture in Naples, San Pietro a Majella underwent a Baroque make-over by the Spanish in the 17th century, but 20th-century restoration attempted to "undo" that and to restore the building to its original Gothic appearance.

== Interior ==
The interior has three naves, separated by pillars supporting Gothic arches, with nine lateral chapels, plus four on each side of the chancel, and transept. The 14th century tomb of Giovanni Pipino da Barletta, architect of the church, is placed on the counter-façade. The tomb was designed by Giovanni Barrile, while the tombs of Petra family members are by the Neapolitan sculptor Lorenzo Vaccaro.

The main altar was completed in the seventeenth-century, built by Cosimo Fanzago, and Pietro and Bartolomeo Ghetti, is decorated with large vases and candlesticks in silver and preceded by a balustrade covered in polychrome marbles. It stands on it a fifteenth-century wooden crucifix, while behind there are frescoes of the 17th century and 16th century sculptures.

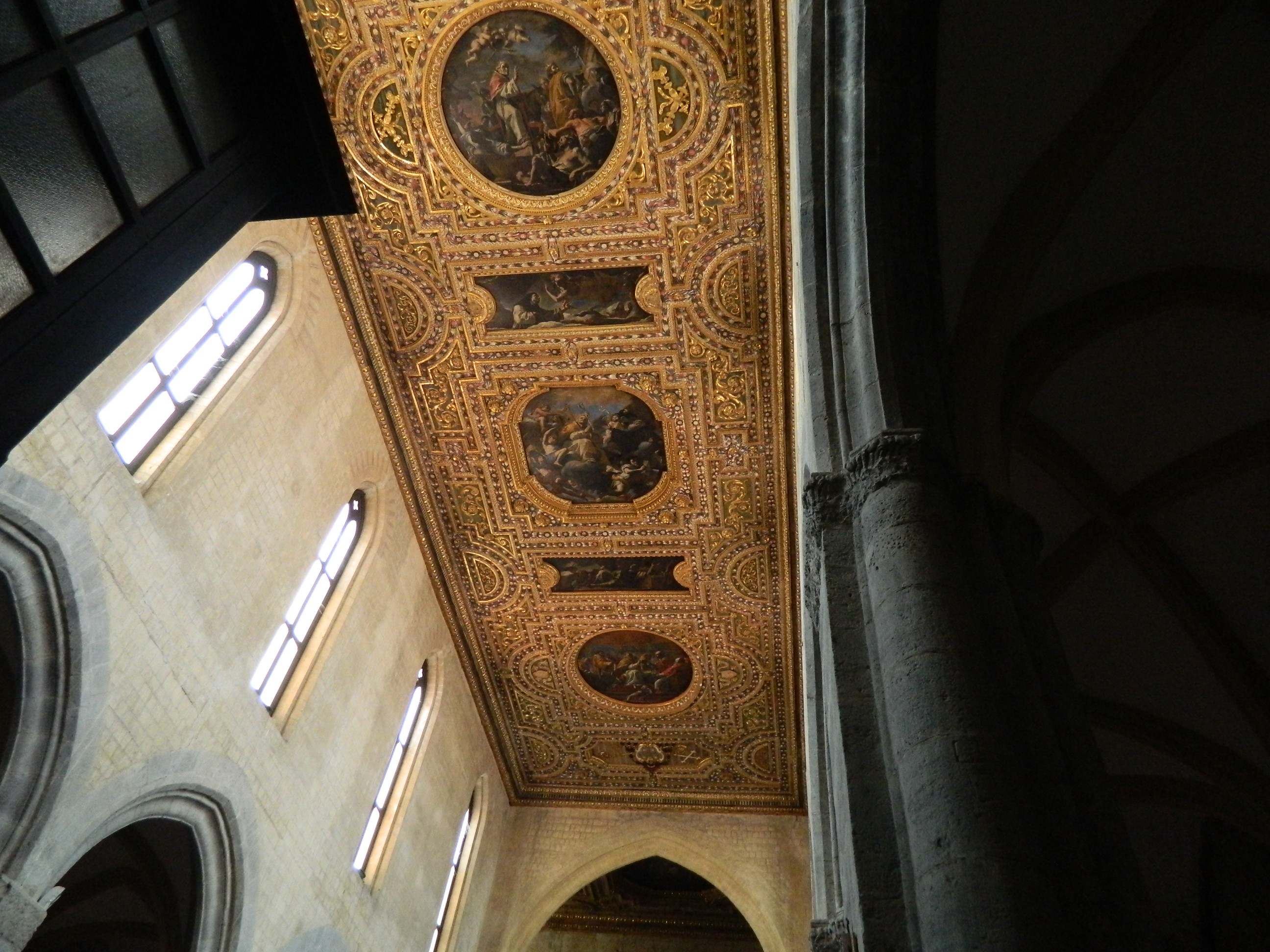
ceiling of the nave

The ceiling of the nave, with drawers, and the transept feature paintings by Mattia Preti depicting Episodes from the life of St. Peter Celestine and Saint Catherine of Alexandria (1657–59).

The works on the nave, starting from the entrance, are:

1. Accompanied by Charles II of Anjou with the Cross, St Peter Celestine the hermit becomes Pope
2. St Peter Celestine in prayer at the Maiella church
3. Glory of St Peter Celestine in papal robes, accompanied by St. Benedict
4. St Peter Celestine in prayer at the Maiella church, suffering temptation
5. The saint with the tiara in hand, in the act of making the great refusal

The works of the transept, from left to right, are:

1. St Catherine defends her faith in dispute with the sophists
2. Develops stigmata in prison and assisted by the angels
3. Beheading of the saint in front of the tyrant Maxentius
4. Mystic Marriage of St Catherine
5. Lifeless body of the saint, strewn with roses, is taken to heaven by angels

== Chapels ==
- First chapel on left: There is a painting by Niccolo Rossi depicting Bishop San Biagio; chapel has Maiolica tiles with designs typical of Aragon.
- Second chapel on left: This is the chapel of the Spinelli-Raetano family with two funerary monuments of the family of which the one on the left wall, is characterized by a bust of the Roman period depicting Trajan. The Assumption of the Virgin (1705) painted by Giacomo del Po.
- Third chapel on left: Allows entry or exit, to Piazza Luigi Miraglia through port placed under the bell tower.
- Fourth chapel on left: Houses three tombs, one of which appears to be the tomb of the philosopher, physician and scientist Leonardo Di Capua. The chapel is also characterized by decorations in marble and a Crucifixion by Domenico Viola.
- Fifth chapel on left: The chapel is dedicated to the Colonna-Zagarolo family. Contains three paintings by Francesco De Mura: Preaching Santoronzo (altar ),Baptism of St. Horace (left wall) and Martyrdom of St. Horace (right wall).
- Transept - left apse: Dedicated to the Petra family, the chapel houses in the two side walls the funerary monuments of Domenico and Vincenzo Petra, archbishop of Damascus, cardinal, and member of the Sacred Congregation for the Propagation of the Faith, both works of Lorenzo Vaccaro. In addition to the tiled floor, where there are two tombstones, one of 1739 to Isabella Altemps the wife of the duke of Gallese, Nicholas Petra, the chapel is also characterized by a fresco depicting the Madonna del Soccorso.
- Transept - Second to the left of the apse chapel (Chapel Pippin): The floor is majolica tiles and is marked by a monument of Paul Salbana and Giottesque frescoes depicting ‘’Stories of Mary Magdalene’’. The author of the frescoes from Bologna was identified with the anonymous "Master John Barrile" active in Naples active in the Barrile Chapel of San Lorenzo Maggiore. The cycle of frescoes may have been made earlier than 1356, the year Giovanni Pepino, the buyer, died.

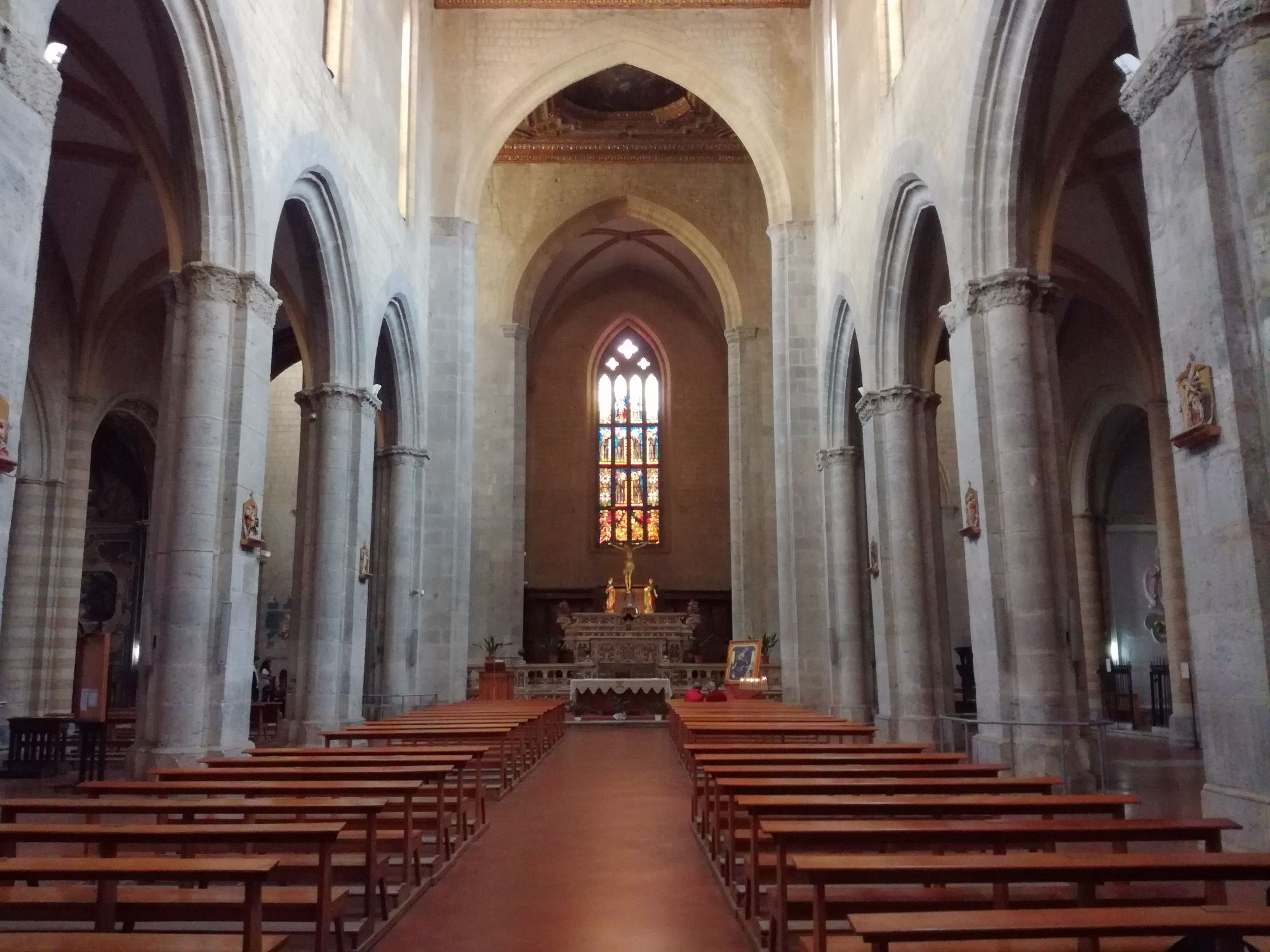
The nave

- Transept on the right of the apse: Contains works of Giovanni da Nola and Onofrio De Leo. Of the first there is an altar with a Deposition (painting) and a sculpture of St Sebastian. The second there are two paintings, San Cristoforo da Padua with the host (1643) and San Francesco di Paola in front of the Kings of Aragon breaking a coin from which radiates blood, and other paintings depicting the Madonna, San Domenico, John the Baptist and St Francis.

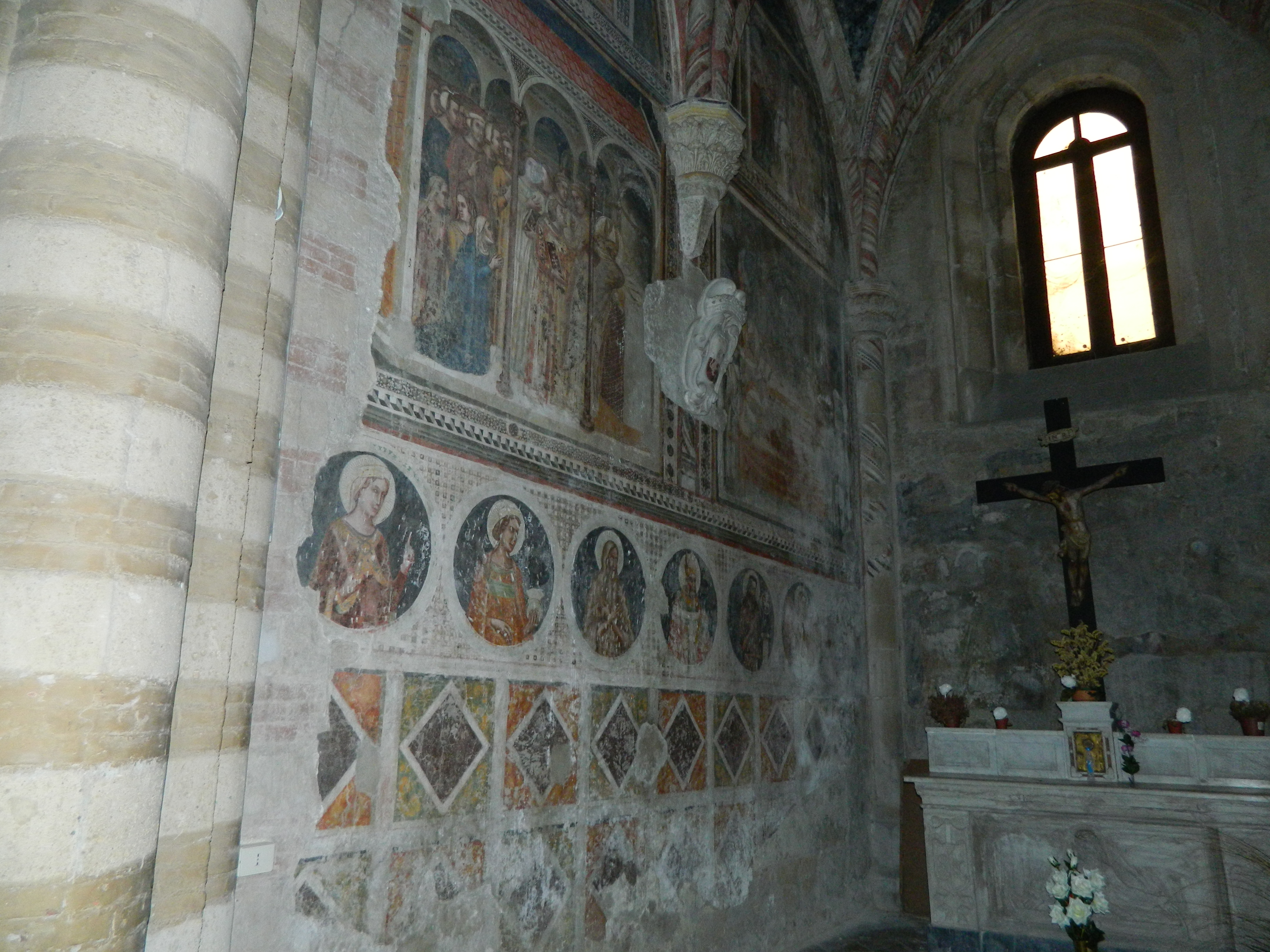
fourteenth-century frescoes of the chapel Lioness

- Transept right of the apse chapel (Lionella Chapel): It has a cycle of frescoes dating depicting Stories of St. Martin (1355-1360). The chapel also has sculptures in marble, representing two arms of which one of the family Lionella and the other, the family Petra (whose chapel is located inside the church, to the left of the apse), depicting a lion rampant holding a stone in one paw and a severed head in the other.
- First chapel on right: There is the tomb of the family Stinga.
- Second chapel on right: There is a painting of St Benedict takes leave from St Scholastica by Girolamo Cenatiempo.
- Third chapel on right: The chapel was badly damaged during World War II and contains an altar and a painting of the Seven Holy Founders of the Servite Order (1892). Both come from the destroyed Church of St Thomas Aquinas.
- Fourth chapel on right: (Chapel of St. Peter): On the front is a painting by Massimo Stanzione, the Madonna appearing to St Peter Celestine, while on the sides there are two paintings by Cenatiempo: on the right, Nativity of St Peter C., and left Death of St Peter Celestine (1711). Finally, in the vault and lunettes, also by Cenatiempo, are Apotheosis of St. Peter Celestine and allegorical figures.
- Fifth chapel on right: There is a Marriage of St Catherine by Cenatiempo and a Dream of St Catherine by Nicola Malinconico.

== Sources ==
- De Lellis, De Minieri Riccio, Brevi notizie dell'archivio angioino, Naples 1872.
- A. Venditti, Urbanistica e architettura angioina, in Storia di Napoli, Naples 1969.
- O. Morisani, L'arte di Napoli nell'età angioina, in Storia di Napoli, Naples 1969.
- Celano - Chiarini, Notizie del bello dell'antico e del curioso, Naples 1972.
