= Aurora Sanseverino =

Italian noblewoman, salon-holder, patron and poet (1669–1726)

- Duchess of Laurenzana
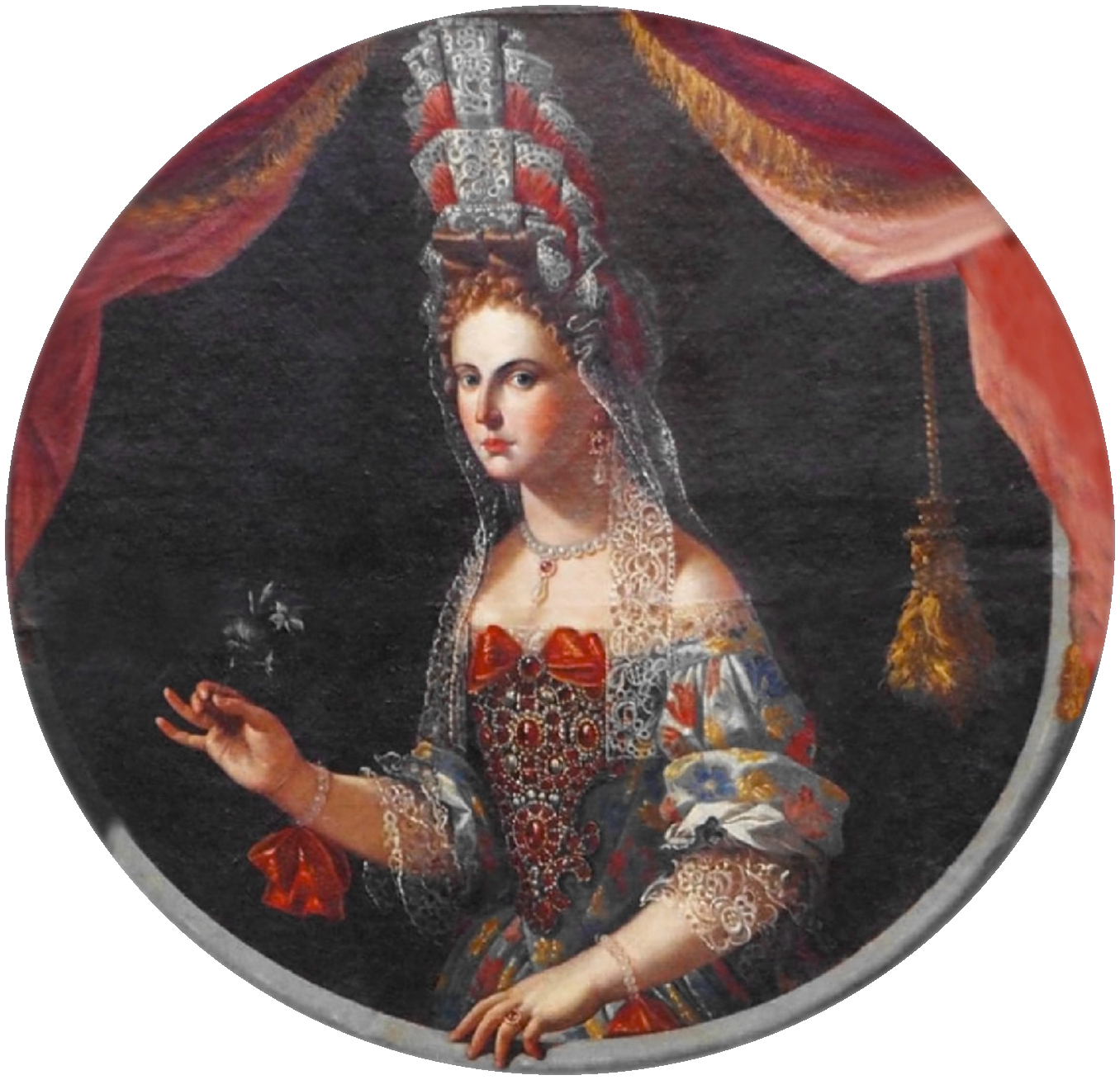
- Aurora Sanseverino, by Francesco Solimena
- Born: 28 April 1669; Saponaria, Kingdom of Naples
- Died: 2 July 1726 (aged 57); Piedimonte d'Alife, Kingdom of Naples
- Noble family: Sanseverino
- Spouses: Girolamo Acquaviva; Nicola Gaetani dell'Aquila d'Aragona
- Father: Carlo Maria Sanseverino
- Mother: Maria Fardella
- Occupation: Poet, singer, actress

Aurora Sanseverino (28 April 1669 – 2 July 1726) was an Italian noblewoman, salon-holder, patron and poet. One of the most celebrated women in the highest rank of the Neapolitan aristocracy, she was known for her great cultural activity as a patron and mecenat of art and for her famous cultural salon in Naples, and correspondent of several contemporary culture personalities that made her a central figure in baroque Italy.

She also contributed much to giving women a dignified place in the cultural circles of Neapolitan society of the time.

== Biography ==
Born in Saponara (the actual Grumento Nova, province of Potenza), she was the daughter of Carlo Maria Sanseverino, Prince of Bisignano and Count of Saponara, and Maria Fardella, Countess of Paceco. At the age of 11, she married Girolamo Acquaviva, Count of Conversano, but she was widowed after few years and later remarried Nicola Gaetani dell'Aquila d'Aragona, Count of Alife, Duke of Laurenzana and Prince of Piedimonte, who would become his lifelong companion.

She moved with her husband to Naples, opening an important salon. Her circle included some of the kingdom's most prominent scholars and thinkers, most notably Giambattista Vico, Gian Vincenzo Gravina and Giuseppe Valletta. In 1691 she joined the Accademia degli Arcadi in Rome, under the name of Lucinda Coritesia, being one of the first women to be accepted to the academy. She was one of the first members of the Colonia Sebezia in Naples and also belonged to the Accademia degli Spensierati in Rossano. Most of her production has been lost and only a few sonnets survived.

Many artists worked under her tutelage including painters Francesco Solimena, Paolo de Matteis, Bernardo de' Dominici, Giovanni Battista Ruoppolo, Giacinto and Domenico Brandi, Teresa del Pò, Giacomo Nani, Nicola Maria Rossi, Michele Pagano (whose son Nicola played double bass in her musical performances) and composers Nicola Fago, Nicola Porpora, Giacomo Antonio Perti, Francesco Mancini, Domenico Sarro.

She is best known for her collaboration with George Frideric Handel, commissioning the serenata Aci, Galatea e Polifemo for the wedding of her niece Princess Beatrice di Montemiletto and Tolomeo Saverio Gallo, Duke of Alvito, which took place in Naples on 19 July 1708. In 1716, Aurora and her husband commissioned Alessandro Scarlatti's La Gloria di Primavera, on a text by her private secretary Niccolò Giuvo, on the occasion of the birth of Archduke Leopold, son of Charles VI and Elisabeth Christine, although the child was destined to live only 7 months.

Her later life was marked by sadness for the loss her children Pasquale and Cecilia. Cecilia, who died in 1710, had recently given birth to Raimondo di Sangro, future inventor and alchemist.

Aurora died in Piedimonte d'Alife (today known as Piedimonte Matese, province of Caserta), aged 57.

== Bibliography ==
- Thomas C. Willette, Massimo Stanzione and Bernardo De Dominici: The Life and Work of a Neapolitan Painter, Johns Hopkins University, 1988
- Annette Landgraf, David Vickers, The Cambridge Handel Encyclopedia, Cambridge University Press, 2009
