= Francesco Valletta =

Italian philologist and historian (1680 – 1760)

Francesco Valletta (1680 – 1760) was an Italian scholar, philologist and historian.

== Biography ==
Born in Naples, his father Diego's brother was Giuseppe Valletta. Well-versed in languages and study of ancient monuments, Francesco joined his father in selling off Giuseppe's estates and collections to cure the family's dire financial issues. All its ancient statues were sold to an English physician for 1,100 ducats, as well as 45 Etruscan vases and the library to the Oratorians in Naples for 14,000 ducats.

He studied law from 1698 to 1702, graduating in 1711. He became a great friend of Matteo Egizio and kept up a long correspondence with Ludovico Antonio Muratori. He wrote many poems in Latin, ancient Greek and Italian which were published in several collections during his lifetime. In 1755 he and fourteen others were chosen to found the Accademia Ercolanese. He was initially also going to be its permanent secretary, but his age and failing health meant he could not keep up that role, ceding it to Pasquale Carcani.

== Bibliography ==
- Castaldi, Giuseppe Niccolò F. (1840). Della Regale Accademia Ercolanese dalla sua fondazione sinora con un cenno biografico de' suoi soci ordinari (in Italian). Naples. p. 104.
