= Santa Maria Donnaromita =

Church building in Naples, Italy

Coordinates: 40.848016°N 14.256251°E

Santa Maria Donnaromita is a former church located on via Paladino in Naples.

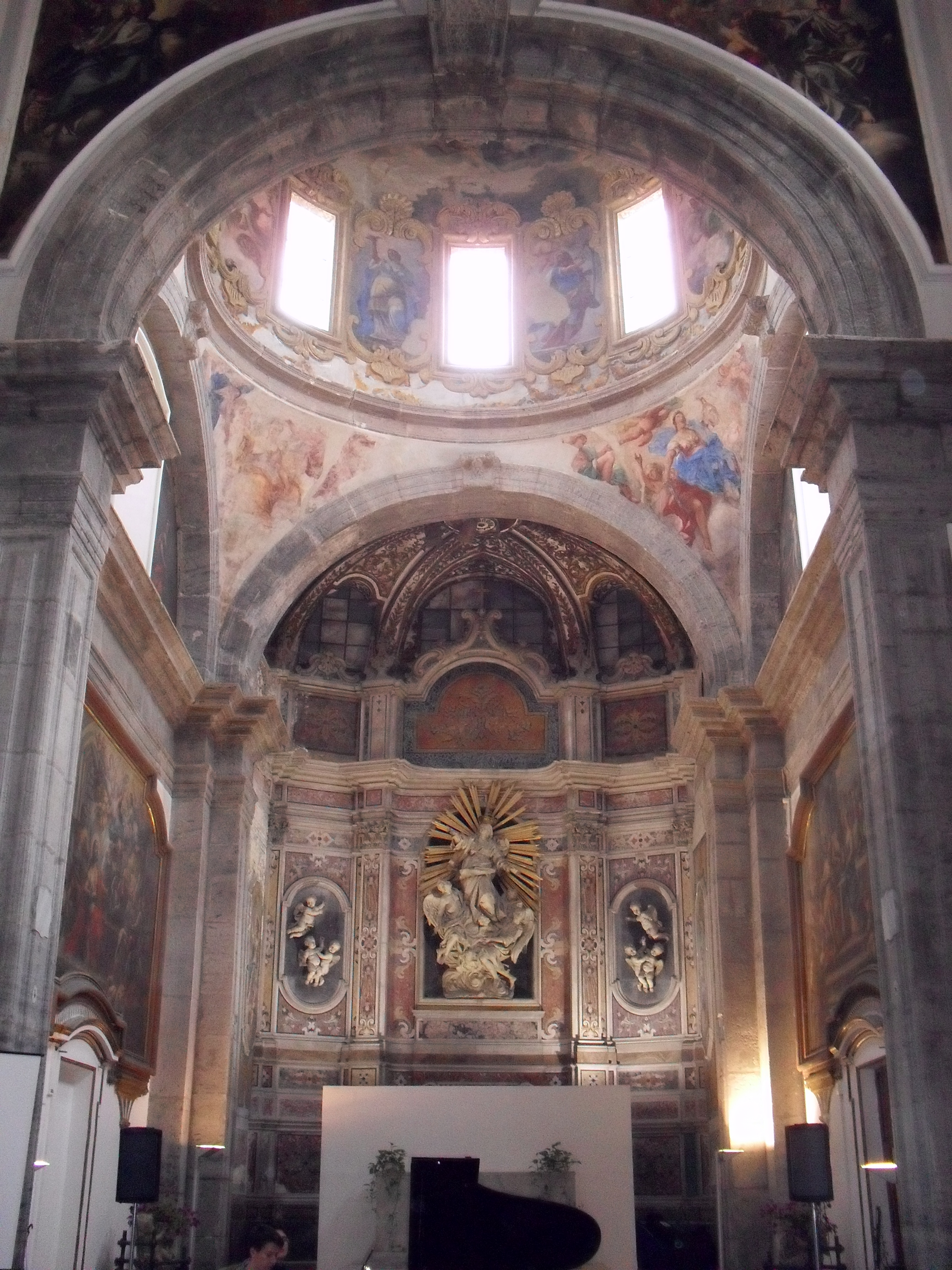
Altar and cupola

A church at the site was first founded by nuns putatively fleeing in 1025 from iconoclasm in Constantinople, and thus initially gave the monastery the title: Monasterium Monialum Santa Mariae de Percejo de Constantinopoli ordini Cisterciensium regulae San Bernardi. In time this became the church of Santa Mariae dominarum de Romania de Neapolitanum ordinis Cisterciensis.

By 14th century a church on the present plan was built, and refurbished in the 16th century by Giovanni Francesco di Palma along with construction of the convent and cloisters by Giovanni Vincenzo Della Monica. Further reconstructions in the 16th and 17th centuries gave the complex its Baroque imprint. In the 19th century, the church was suppressed and became an engineering school. It was damaged during the Second World War.

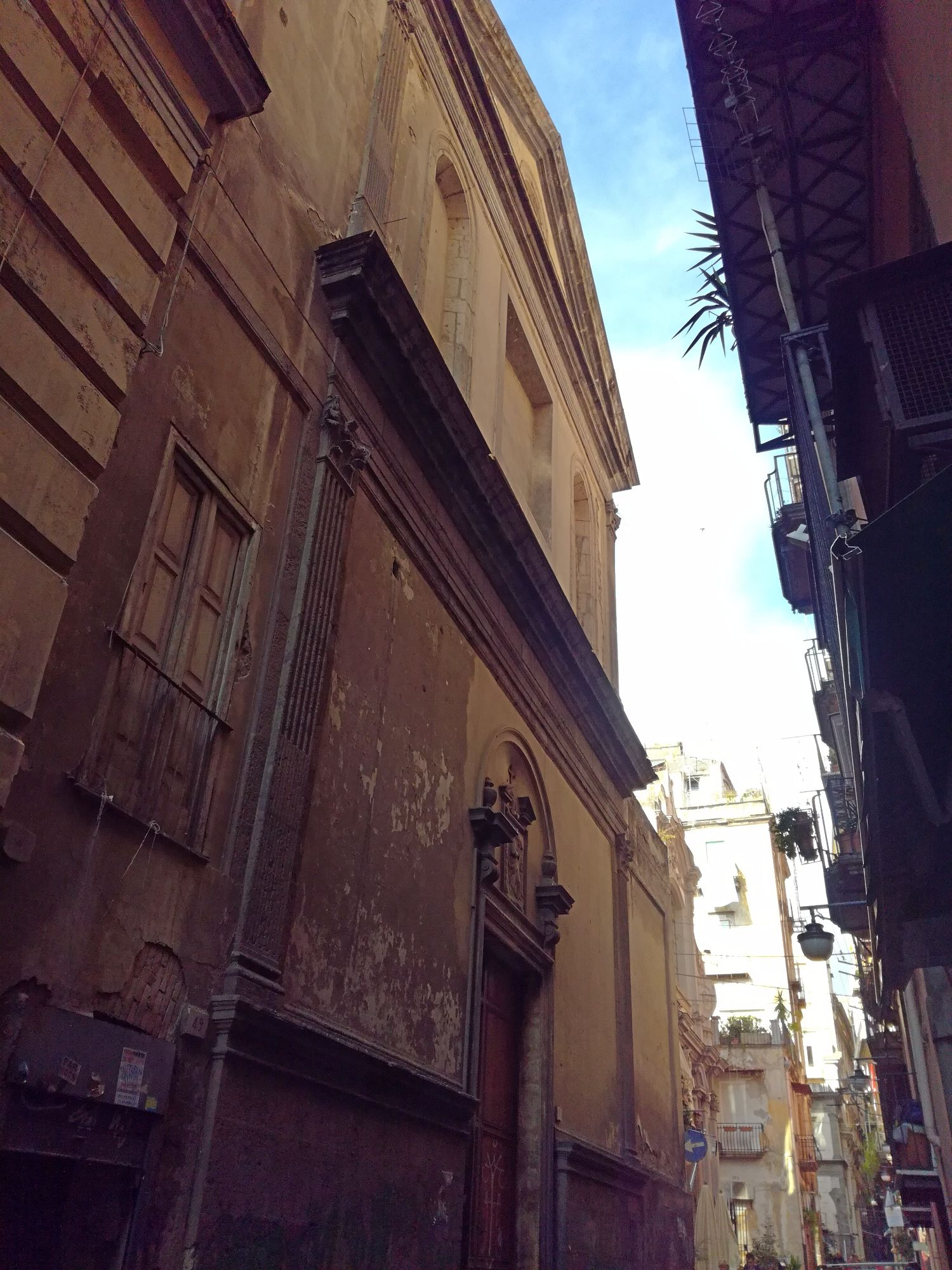
Facade

The interior ceiling (1587–1590) was decorated by Giovanni Andrea Magliuolo and painted by Teodoro d'Errico; on the counterfacade is an Epiphany (1728), while the cupola was frescoed by Luca Giordano. In the apse are the remains of the main altar sculpted by the brothers Bartolomeo and Pietro Ghetti; The pavement was designed by Donato Massa. In the chapel, Duke Theodore's remains are housed in a reused ancient Roman sarcophagus.

== See also ==
- 16th-century Western domes

== Bibliography ==
- Vincenzo Regina, Le chiese di Napoli. Viaggio indimenticabile attraverso la storia artistica, architettonica, letteraria, civile e spirituale della Napoli sacra, Newton and Compton Editor, Naples 2004.
