= Bernardo de' Dominici =

Italian painter

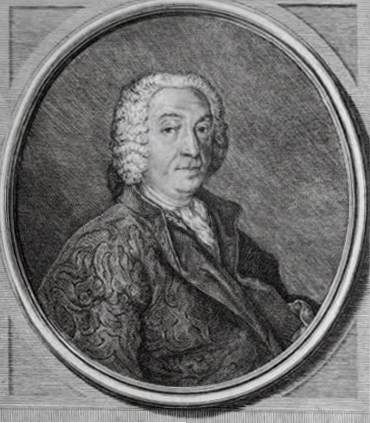
- Bernardo de' Dominici
- Born: 13 December 1683; Naples, Kingdom of Naples
- Died: 1759 (aged 75–76); Naples, Kingdom of Naples
- Works: Vite dei pittori, scultori ed architetti napoletani

Academic work
- Discipline: History of art

Bernardo De Dominici or Bernardo de Dominici or Bernardo de' Dominici (13 December 1683 – 1759) was an Italian art historian and minor landscape and genre painter, active mainly in his native Naples. He is now best known as the author of the Vite dei pittori, scultori ed architetti napoletani, a three-volume collection of biographies of Neapolitan artists, for which he is sometimes called the Vasari of Naples.

== Life ==
Bernardo De Dominici was born in Naples on 13 December 1683 to Camilla Tartaglione and the Maltese painter, musician and collector Raimondo de' Dominici (1645-1705). He was the younger brother of the actor, musician, and composer Giampaolo De Dominici (1680-1758), and nephew of Suor Maria de Dominici, a Maltese artist. His father had been a pupil of Mattia Preti in Malta and had moved to Naples when he was around 20 years of age. In one of the few autobiographical statements, De Dominici remarked that in 1698, when he was around 14 years old, his father took him to Malta, where Bernardo studied with Preti briefly until the elderly painter's death in January 1699.

After Bernardo De Dominici's return to Naples in 1701, he dedicated himself to painting as a pupil of Francesco Solimena, who, though primarily a history painter, trained him in landscape painting. He also studied under the German landscape painter Franz Joachim Beich, who was then working in Naples, as well as with the Dutch painter Paul Ganses, a specialist in moonlit seascapes. For many years, De Dominici lived in the household of the duke of Laurenzana (or Laurenzano), Niccolò Gaetani dell'Aquila d'Aragona, and his wife, Aurora Sanseverino (1669-1726), patron, poet, and member of the Roman Accademia degli Arcadi, a literary and philosophical society, whose branch in Naples she hosted. As he later described it, De Dominici served the duchess "as a painter of landscapes, seascapes, and scenes of everyday life" (bambocciate or genre scenes), sometimes in collaboration with Domenico Brandi, who specialized in painting animals. De Dominici claimed that his bambocciate pleased the public as well as Count Harrach, the important collector and Austrian viceroy of Naples (1728-1733). No paintings by De Dominici have been identified, however, although an inventory of the duke of Laurenzana's collection lists eleven small landscapes by him.

In great part because of his association with Sanseverino, De Dominici was in contact with the intellectual and artistic elite of Naples, among them Solimena, Giambattista Vico, Francesco Valletta, Matteo Egizio, and Antonio Roviglione, with whom he exchanged sonnets. By 1721, De Dominici was gathering biographical material on Neapolitan artists. He published a biography of Luca Giordano in 1728 and his Lives of the Neapolitan Painters, Sculptors, and Architects in three volumes from 1742 to 1745.

De Dominici was married twice: to Palma Vittoria Nicolini in 1717 and to a Roman widow, Maria Marta Maddalena Quaresima, in 1735.

More than once, but unsuccessfully, De Dominici petitioned king Charles VII of Naples (later, from 1759, king Charles III of Spain) to appoint him director of the royal gallery of paintings. De Dominici died in poverty on 30 April 1759. He was buried in the Neapolitan church of Santa Croce di Palazzo.

== Lives of the Neapolitan Painters, Sculptors, and Architects ==
Bernardo De Dominici's first publication, a biography of the most celebrated Neapolitan painter, Luca Giordano (1634-1705), was appended to the second edition of Giovanni Pietro Bellori's Lives of the Artists, published in Naples in 1728 by Francesco Ricciardi (or Ricciardo), who republished the Giordano biography as a stand-alone book in 1729. Ricciardi was subsequently responsible for the publication of several important texts on art, including De Dominici's major work, the Lives of the Neapolitan Painters, Sculptors, and Architects (Vite dei pittori, scultori ed architetti napoletani). In this three-volume collection of biographies, published in Naples in 1742-1745, De Dominici treated artists from the thirteenth century to his own time. Most of the artists were Neapolitan natives or immigrants who spent most of their careers in Naples, though De Dominici also included famous Neapolitans who made their careers largely or entirely elsewhere (namely, Salvator Rosa and Gian Lorenzo Bernini). He discussed but did not devote full biographies to significant artists who worked in Naples relatively briefly, such as Caravaggio, Domenichino, Guido Reni, Giovanni Lanfranco, and Artemisia Gentileschi. The most important immigrant artist in Naples, the Spaniard Jusepe de Ribera, De Dominici mistakenly thought to have been born in Gallipoli, in the province of Lecce (then part of the Spanish viceroyalty of Naples), albeit the son of a Spanish father.

De Dominici's Lives comprises almost one hundred chapters, ranging in length from a single page to nearly 150 pages, each of which is called either a life (vita), notice (notizia), or recollection (memoria). Its structure follows that of Giorgio Vasari's Lives of the Most Excellent Painters, Sculptors, and Architects, with prefatory material to each volume followed by biographies arranged chronologically. Like other collections of biographies of regional Italian artists published in the nearly two centuries since the appearance of Vasari's Lives, such as Carlo Cesare Malvasia's Felsina pittrice, vite de' pittori bolognesi (1678), De Dominici's Lives offered a complement to, and updating and implicit critique of, Vasari's Tuscany-focused book. In his Le vite de' pittori, scultori, architetti perugini of 1732, Lione Pascali noted that what others had done for Venice, Modena, Genoa, Bologna, and Verona, De Dominici was doing for Naples. In his address to the Eletti (representatives) of the city of Naples in the first volume of his Lives, De Dominici noted that "Florence, Bologna, Venice, Genoa, and other illustrious cities, . . boasting the merits of their professors [of art] and raising to the stars the excellent works they had made, wanted their youth to follow in the glorious footsteps of the Raphaels, Correggios, Titians, and Michelangelos." Moved by such examples to pity the fate of many praiseworthy Neapolitan painters, architects, and sculptors, De Dominici wrote, he determined to raise them from the darkness of oblivion in which they languished.

De Dominici's Lives did not sell well. A four-volume edition of the Lives was published in Naples in 1840-1846. An annotated edition was published in 2003. Aside from excerpts, the book has not been translated into any other language from its original Italian.

The Lives came under significant criticism already in the eighteenth century, though it remained an authoritative source through the nineteenth century until some scholars, especially those associated with the new journal, Napoli nobilissima, called for a modern "critical history" of art in Naples, based on documents and philological scrutiny of narratives, inscriptions and other texts, that would obviate De Dominici's text. The critique and dismissal of De Dominici as a source achieved its most pointed expression when the young Benedetto Croce dubbed him "Il Falsario" ("The Forger") in an 1892 essay in the journal. Many of De Dominici's assertions have proven to be inaccurate, and considerable criticism has been levied against his use of putative sources (especially a manuscript from the 16th-century "notary Criscuolo" and notes from the 17th-century painter Massimo Stanzione) that were suspected of being invented by the author himself. Nonetheless, efforts have been made since the second half of the twentieth century to recover the Lives' utility for historians of Neapolitan art by recognizing his astute criticism of works of art and understanding the rhetorical mode of the genre of early-modern biographies in which De Dominici wrote. The growing appreciation for De Dominici's connoisseurship has helped scholars revisit questions such as the use of drawings in early-modern Naples.

== Bibliography ==
- Willette, Thomas (1986). "Bernardo De Dominici e le Vite de' pittori, scultori ed architetti napoletani: contributo alla riabilitazione di una fonte". Ricerche sul '600 napoletano: Dedicato a Ulisse Prota-Giurleo nel centenario della nascita. Milan: Edizioni L & T. pp. 255–273.
- Bologna, Ferdinando (1987). "De Dominici, Bernardo". Dizionario Biografico degli Italiani (in Italian). Vol. 33: D'Asaro–De Foresta. Rome: Istituto dell'Enciclopedia Italiana. ISBN 978-88-12-00032-6.
- Willette, Thomas (2003). "Dominici, Bernardo de". Grove Art Online. Oxford University Press. doi:10.1093/gao/9781884446054.article.T023230.
