= Marco Mazzaroppi =

Italian painter

Marco Mazzaroppi (1550–1620) was an Italian painter, mainly painting religious subjects.

== Biography ==
Little is known of his biography. He is said to have been born in San Germano (Cassino). Luigi Lanzi takes note of his Flemish style. Bernardo de Dominici stated that Mazzaropi studied in both Rome and Flanders. He painted canvas of St Gregory in the chapel of St Gregory the Great, and the Martyrdom of St Andrew in another chapel of the church in Monte Cassino. He also painted in Santa Andrea Vallefredda. One of his pupils was Giacomo Manecchia, who was later active in Naples.
