= Giovanni Andrea Magliuolo =

Italian painter

Giovanni Andrea Magliuolo (active 1580–1603) was an Italian painter, active in Naples, Italy.

== Biography ==
He was active in the decoration of Santa Maria Donnaromita. He was a contemporary of Teodoro Errico, Cristiano de Noja, and Giovanni Vincenzo Forli.
