= Salvatore D'Aula =

- Born: 22 April 1718; Naples, Italy
- Died: 1782 (aged 63–64)
- Other names: Salvatore Aula
- Occupations: Priest; Latin scholar; archaeologist

Salvatore D'Aula or Aula (22 April 1718 – 1782) was an Italian priest, Latin scholar, and archeologist. He was born in Naples, and studied in the local seminary under Carlo Maiello. He was selected by King Charles VII of Naples in 1755 to be a member of a newly formed Accademia Ercolanese to assess artifacts from Pompeii and the newly discovered town of Herculaneum. He taught rhetoric in Greek and Latin at the seminary. He published in Latin in two volumes in 1778 a book about Roman culture and artifacts, titled Antiquitatum Romanarum Epitome ad usum Seminarii Neapoletano.
