= Le Antichità di Ercolano Esposte =

18th century archaeology book

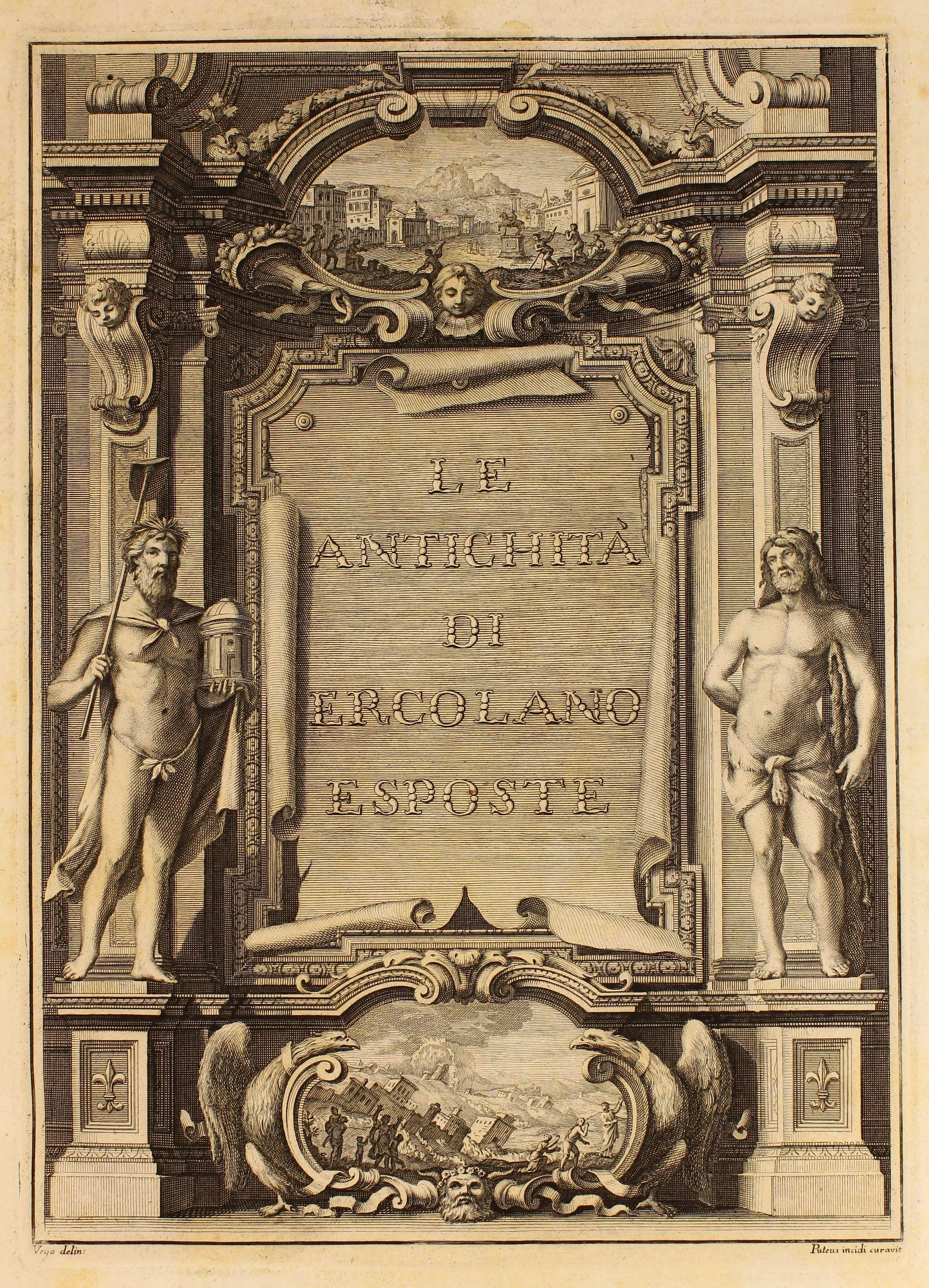
- Original title: Antichità di Ercolano
- Language: Italian
- Subject: Archaeology
- Published: 1757–1792 (Charles VII of Naples)
- Publication place: Italy
- Media type: Print
- OCLC: 56782711

The Le Antichità di Ercolano Esposte (Antiquities of Herculaneum Exposed) is an eight-volume book of engravings of the findings from excavating the ruins of Herculaneum in the Kingdom of Naples (now Italy). It was published between 1757 and 1792, and copies were given to selected recipients across Europe. Despite the title, the Antichità di Ercolano shows objects from all the excavations the Bourbons undertook around the Gulf of Naples. These include Pompeii, Stabiae, and two sites in Herculaneum: Resina and Portici.

The engravings are high quality and the accompanying text displays great scholarship, but the book lacks the information on context that would be expected of a modern archaeological work. Le Antichità was designed more to impress readers with the quality of the objects in the King of Naples' collection than to be used in research. The book gave impetus to the neoclassical movement in Europe by giving artists and decorators access to a huge store of Hellenistic motifs.

== Background ==
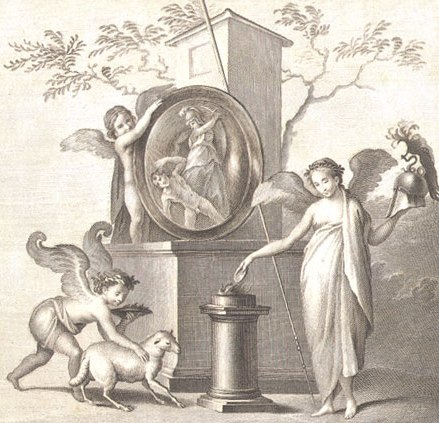
Victory sacrifices to Athena (volume 2)

The excavations at Heculaneum began in 1711, when a well was being dug for the new country house of Emmanuel Maurice, Duke of Elbeuf at Portici. The well turned out to have been sunk into the buried and richly ornamented proscenium of the theater of Herculaneum, and yielded several valuable marbles, including a statue of Hercules. The duke was extremely short of money. He smuggled the pieces to Rome to be restored, and then "gave" them to Prince Eugene of Savoy, his cousin. In 1738 Charles VII of Naples − after 1759, Charles III of Spain − began excavations to find objects for his private collection of antiquities, imposing tight security on the site. Interest was maintained by the hope of finding more objects of similar value to the first set of statues.

In 1739 a set of large mythical groups were found in the "Basilica". By 1748 the excavations had unearthed eight full-sized bronze statues. The large works were restored and put on display in the king's museum at Portici. The smaller works were generally not exhibited. The excavations were done by slaves, and it seems that much was destroyed or stolen. News of the finds spread, and Charles drew criticism for the secrecy and lack of science in the excavations.

== Publication ==
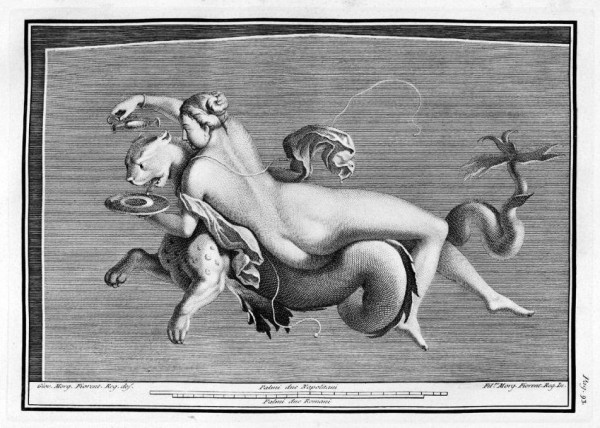
Nereid on a panther (volume 3)

The first publication to record the findings was a large folio book called Disegni intagliati in rame di pitture antiche ritrovate nelle scavazioni di Resina (Copper engravings of the ancient paintings discovered in the excavations of Resina) printed in 1746. Despite the title, the book included drawings of statuettes in bronze and marble, lamps and reliefs. Some engravings showed the objects as they were, while others showed the artist's reconstruction of the original. There were many inaccuracies. The book gave no indication of the locations where the objects were found. Only three copies have survived. These may be the only ones that were produced, perhaps because Charles was dissatisfied with the result.

The Prodromo delle Antichità di Ercolano (Preface to the Antiquities of Herculaneum) was prepared by Ottavio Antonio Bayardi, cousin of the prime minister Giovanni Fogliani, and issued by the Stamperia Reale in 1752. The five volume work tells stories of Hercules and tries to prove that the city was in fact Herculaneum, which had not been in doubt since an inscription was found in 1738, but says nothing about the findings. In 1754 Bayardi published a one volume catalog of the findings. Without illustrations, and with only the most cursory descriptions of the 2,000 objects listed, the catalog has little value.

In 1755 Charles appointed fifteen savants to a newly formed Accademia Ercolanese to study the artifacts and publish the findings. The committee engaged twenty-five leading artists to prepare drawings and engravings on the finds, including Giovanni Elia Morghen, Carlo Nolli and Giovanni Battista Casanova. The best engravers were given the most interesting pieces. A given engraver would be given all pieces of a given style, to ensure consistency.

The academy issued volumes of the work from 1757 to 1792. They were not sold, but were given to the "happy few" that were chosen as recipients. Two thousand copies were printed of the first volume. Charles abdicated in 1759 and was succeeded by the eight-year-old Ferdinand IV. Publication continued under the regent Tanucci. The first four volumes depicted paintings. These were painted wall fragments, including fragments removed from the portico. The fifth volume, published in 1767, was devoted to bronze busts. Another volume on bronze statues was issued in 1771. Plates from the Antichità were copied in London in 1773. Another volume on paintings came out in 1779. An abridged version of the book was published in 1789. The last volume, in 1792, depicted lamps and candelabras. The volumes do not include depictions of the marbles.

== Contents ==
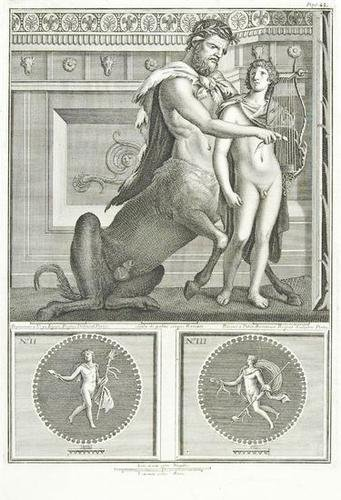
Centaur and lyre player

Despite the title, the Antichità di Ercolano shows objects from all the excavations the Bourbons undertook around the Gulf of Naples. These include Pompeii, Stabiae, and two sites in Herculaneum: Resina and Portici. The book displays a high level of scholarship for the time, and the engravings are of high quality. Most engravings show the frame, if known, have a measurement scale, and are accompanied by a scholarly essay. Some of the smaller objects do not have entries, but are reproduced as unnamed headpieces or tailpieces. There are about 619 copperplate engravings, some double, 836 vignettes and 540 illuminated letters designed by Luigi Vanvitelli and engraved by Carlo Nolli.

The organization was based more on aesthetics than on explaining the context of the Roman site. The first volume contains the largest and most beautiful images. The images of paintings on fragments of the porticus are spread across all five volumes to cover paintings, since the first set of fragments from the portico was found in 1738, and the second set in 1761 after the first two volumes had been published. The artists again indulged in their imagination. A horseback rider that had been shown in the Disegni intagliati with the horse's tail and the rider's right hand missing was drawn by Vincenzo Campana as if it were in undamaged condition. Indeed, many of the engravings seem to be overworked, and presented as if in the pristine and original condition. Unlike other publications such as Charles-Nicolas Cochin and Jerome-Charles Bellicard's Observations upon the Antiquities of the town of Herculaneum, published in 1753, that provide a sketchy and small-scale plate from memory, that are more faithful to the underworked ancient paintings.

Images within each volume are grouped by location, more because they have consistent styles than to show the Roman context. The text typically gave no information about the date and place of the find. The largest four images from the portico are depictions of Theseus, Hercules and Telephus, Achilles and Chiron, and Marsyas and Olympus. The engravers treat them as flat paintings, although in fact they were concave, and their shape shows where they were originally placed in the building. The book contains only a small selection of the paintings that were taken to Portici, although it seems that drawings were made of all these paintings. From 1765 onward the artists drew each painting as it appeared on the wall it decorated.

== Response ==
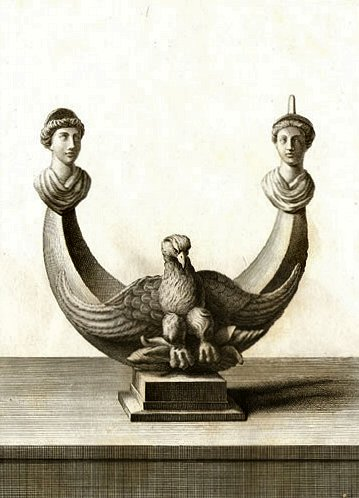
Eagle Lamp (volume 8)

The images in the Antichità di Ercolano, with their Hellenistic origins, had huge appeal to Europeans of the time, and the book provided a great stock of classical motifs that could be used by designers and scholars. The publication was more an advertisement for the collection of remains held in the Palace of Portici than an archaeological record. It was said that due to the book "students of antiquity - that is virtually all lovers of art - would have felt bound to go to Naples, as they were bound to go to Florence and Rome."

The discussion the book generated was mainly about the artistic merits of the wall paintings than about Roman life. It did not cause the rise of neoclassicism, which had earlier origins, but it had a large influence on the decorative arts in Europe. The plates were often used as sources for paintings. Thus Nicolas Gosse and Auguste Vinchon seem to have used it for a series of Scenes from Ancient Life painted in gray-scale for the Louvre. Robert Adam, the British designer, copied figures in the book from the "Villa of Cicero" to the ceiling of the Red Drawing Room at Syon House in 1761-62.

The 1763 La Marchande d'Amours (or La Marchande à la toilette) by Joseph-Marie Vien is a well known example of early French neoclassicism. It is based on an engraving by Carlo Nolli of a painting on the same subject from volume 3 of the Antichità di Ercolano. Vien was open about his borrowing, and invited his audience to compare the two works. The main difference is in the intensity of expression of the three women in Vien's picture, the seller looking at the buyers and the buyers looking at the cupid, compared to the blank expressions and unfocused gazes of the women in Nolli's engraving.

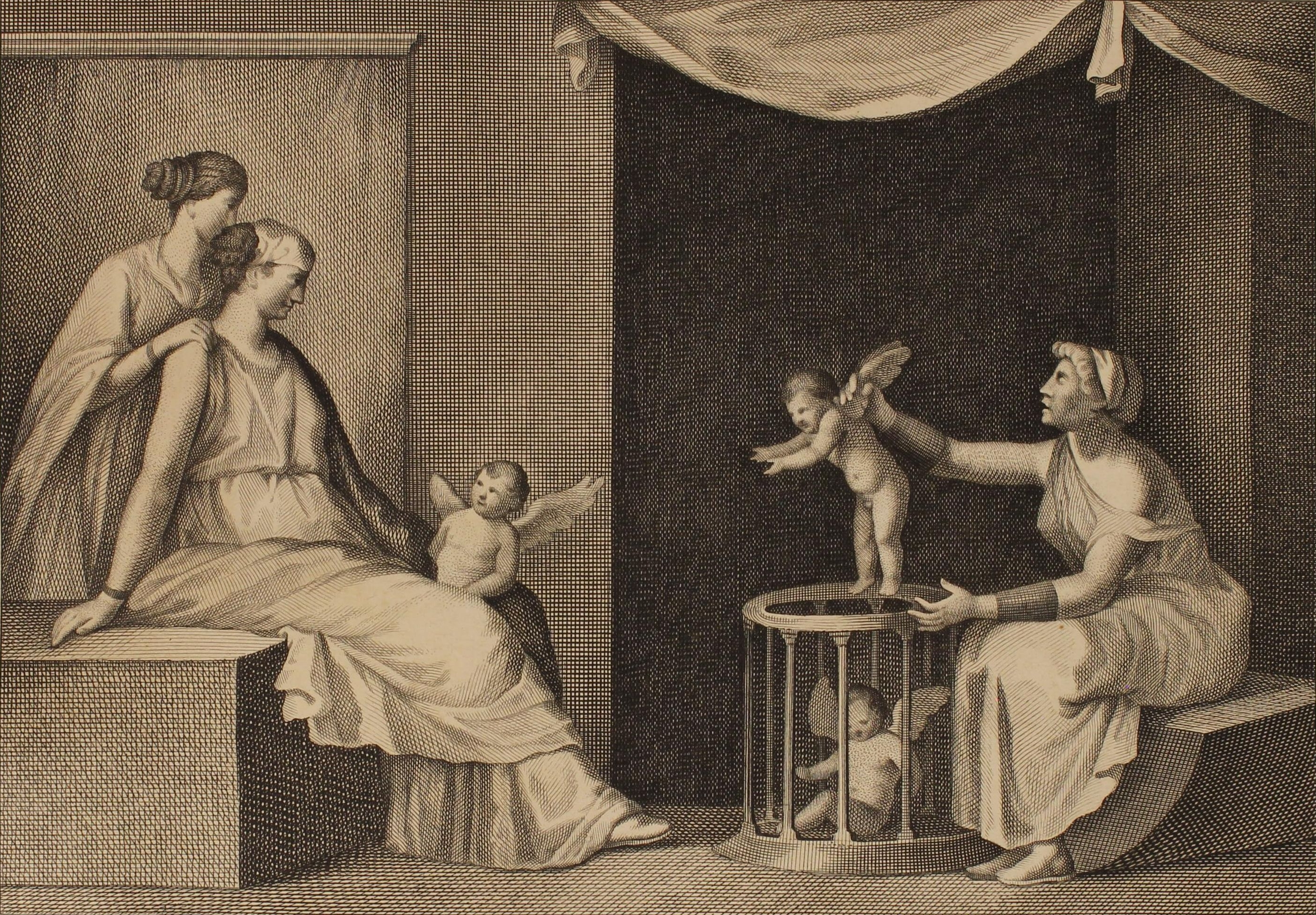
Seller of Loves by Nolli

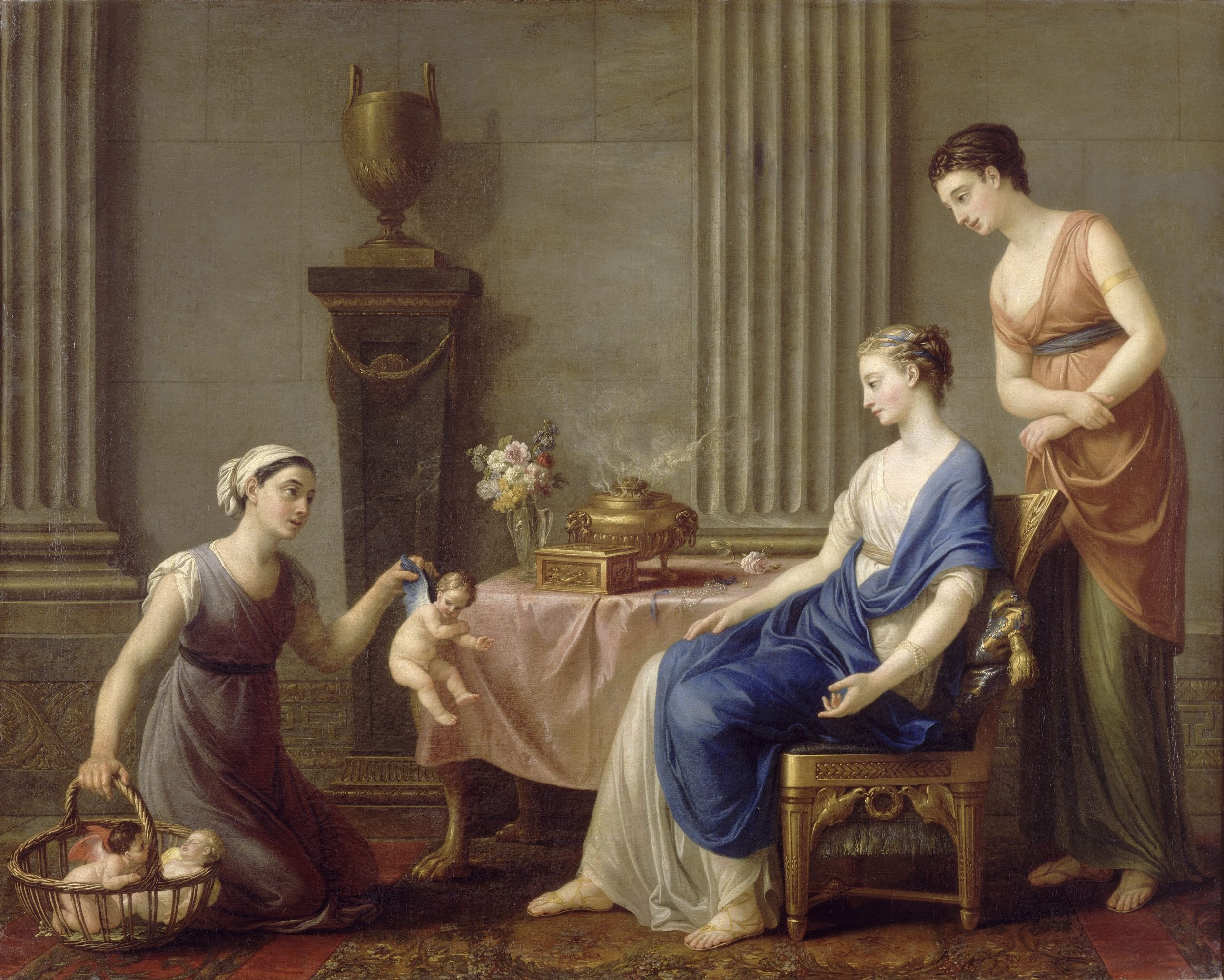
La Marchande d'Amours by Vien

== Volumes ==
The volumes, all printed at Naples by the Regia Stamperia (Royal Press) were as follows:

- Volume 1 1757 Ancient paintings of Herculaneum and region, engraved and described
- Volume 2 1760 Ancient paintings of Herculaneum and region, engraved and described
- Volume 3 1762 Ancient paintings of Herculaneum and region, engraved and described
- Volume 4 1765 Ancient paintings of Herculaneum and region, engraved and described
- Volume 5 1767 Bronzes from Herculaneum and region, engraved and described - Part I: Busts
- Volume 6 1771 Bronzes from Herculaneum and region, engraved and described - Part 2: Statues
- Volume 7 1779 Ancient paintings of Herculaneum and region, engraved and described
- Volume 8 1792 Lamps and Candelabras of Herculaneum and region, engraved and described
