= Pasquale Carcani =

Italian philologist (1721–1783)

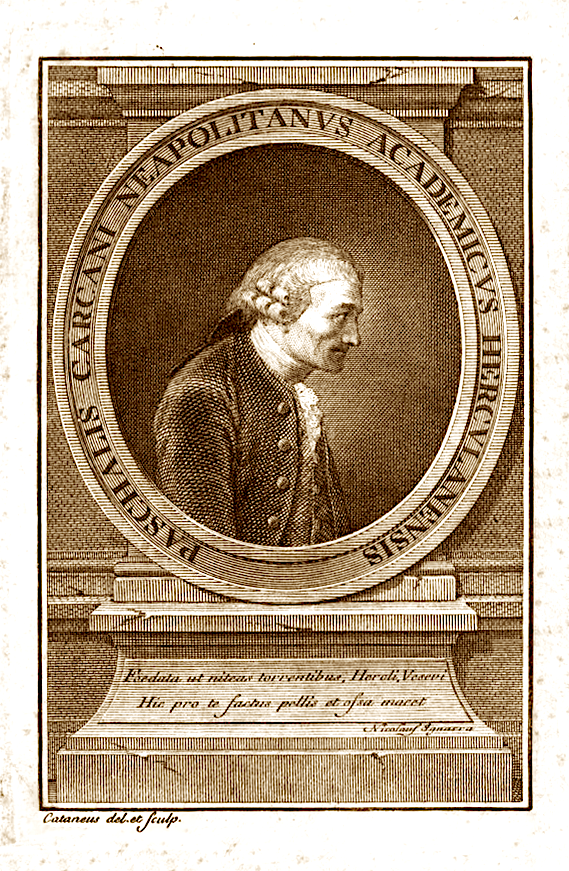
Pasquale Carcani

Pasquale Marco Carcani (March or May 1721 (Note: Two sources state March but a third states May.) – 12 November 1783) was an Italian scholar, philologist and jurist. He was also known by his pseudonym Sofista Pericalle.

== Early life and education ==
Born in Naples to Marco Carcani and Maria Angela de Matteis, (Note: Sister of the painter Paolo De Matteis) his family originated in "Gefunio, or Junonis Fano in the agro Picentinorum", now known as Giffoni Valle Piana in the Principato Citra. The last of six brothers, when Pasquale was aged seven his mother remarried to Onofrio Roseti, meaning he was educated by his stepfather and his eldest brother Domenico, showing early promise.

After studying grammar and rhetoric, he began studying maths with Mario Lama, physics professor at the Regia Università di Napoli and with his brother Nicola Maria (1716–1764), a Piarist priest and director of the Collegio reale di San Carlo alle Mortelle. There he studied the then-dominant Cartesianism and Aristotle's works in the original ancient Greek, having taught himself that language. He then studied canon and civil law under Marcello Papiniano Cusani, then theology and more canon law under Pio Milante.

== Career ==
As a young man, he joined the Accademia Cosentina. When Pasquale was aged 21, Domenico died and so devoted himself to jurisprudence and then politics, whilst sticking with literature, which was always his first love. He also attended lawyer, philologist and jurist Girolamo Pandolfelli's Accademia degli Emuli, hosted in Pandolfelli's own rooms, where he met the era's best scholars and adopted the pseodnym Sofista Pericalle.

In 1755, he was chosen as one of the fifteen members of the Accademia Ercolanese, later becoming its permanent secretary, a role he held until his death. From 1759 to 1776, he was the right-hand-man to marchese Bernardo Tanucci, secretary of state to Naples' royal court during the reign of Charles III. Tanucci appointed him to the secretariat for foreign affairs and for the royal household, involved him in the most important matters and used him for difficult and secret missions. He died in Naples.

== Works ==
- Le Antichità di Ercolano
- Componimenti vari per la morte di D. Domenico Jannacone

== Bibliography (in Italian) ==
- Giuseppe Niccolò F. Castaldi, Della Regale Accademia Ercolanese dalla sua fondazione sinora con un cenno biografico de' suoi soci ordinari, Napoli, 1840, p. 104.
- Carlo Antonio de Rosa marchese di Villarosa, Ritratti poetici di alcuni uomini di lettere antichi e moderni del regno di Napoli, stamperia e cartiera del Fibreno, 1834, p. 64 and following
- Università di Roma, Istituto di studi storico-politici, Storia e politica, Giuffrè editore, 1984.
