= Aci, Galatea e Polifemo =

1708 dramatic cantata by Handel

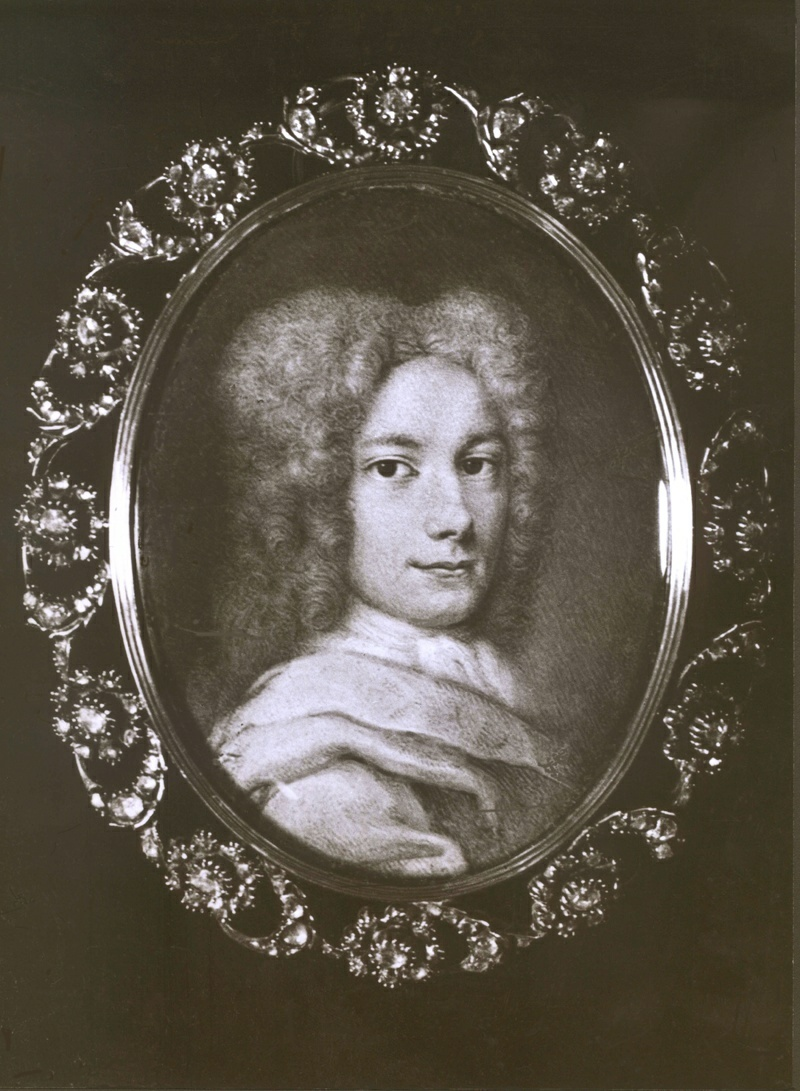
Händel c. 1710

Aci, Galatea e Polifemo (HWV 72) is a serenata for three voices by George Frideric Handel. It was first performed at Naples on 19 July 1708; the completed score is dated to 16 June 1708. A sort of dramatic cantata, the work was commissioned by Duchess Donna Aurora Sanseverino for the wedding of Tolomeo Saverio Gallo, Duke of Alvito, and Beatrice Tocco di Montemiletto, Princess of Acaja and the duchess's niece.

Its Italian libretto was writtenby Nicola Giuvo, secretary and adviser to the duchess, and it prefigures that of Handel's 1718 English-language masque Acis and Galatea, although Handel drew little on the music of the serenata when he prepared the masque (he did take care to make the villain, the one-eyed giant (cyclops) Polyphemus, half-lovable, with a signature comic aria demanding virtuosity: "O ruddier than the cherry"). In the serenata, the cyclops' role entails actions with lethal consequences for Aci and is notable for its range and the vocal agility it requires; it rises from the D below the bass staff to the A above it — and that in its satirical, ponderous buffa aria, "Fra l'ombre e gl'orrori"; it may have been taken at the premiere by the bass Antonio Manna, who sang at the court chapel in Vienna.
