= Giuseppe Valletta =

Italian philosopher and lawyer (1636–1714)

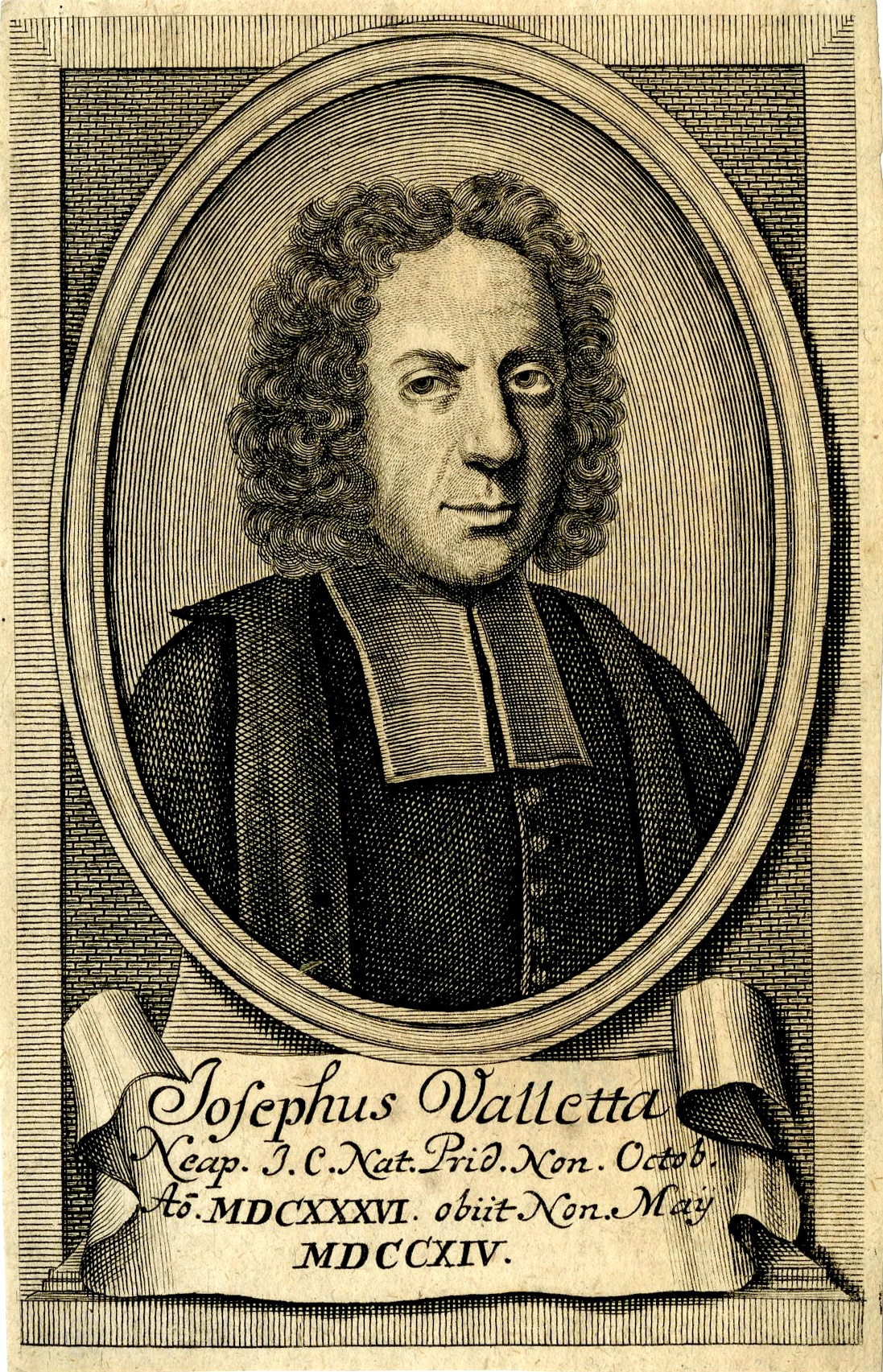

Giuseppe Valletta (6 October 1636 – 16 May 1714) was an Italian philosopher, lawyer, jurist and scholar.

== Life ==
Born in Naples, he studied literature under the Jesuits as a child before switching to law. In 1663, he along with Francesco D'Andrea and others formed the Accademia degli Investiganti, which gave added impetus to the cultural renewal of southern Italy in the last decades of the 17th century. Its members like Valletta, D'Andrea, Tommaso Cornelio and Leonardo Di Capua actively supported the progressives in the heated philosophical-scientific debates of the time between progressives and conservatives. In 1681, he paid to found a chair in ancient Greek at the University of Naples, putting his own tutor and friend Gregorio Messere in charge of teaching. His nephew Francesco also became a scholar.

In 1687, he edited the Naples edition of Francesco Redi's Bacco in Toscana as well as Redi's complete works. He gathered a library of 18,000 books which became known as the Helluo librorum et Secli Peireskius alter. After Valletta's death in Naples, Giambattista Vico's efforts ensured that the library was merged into the Biblioteca dei Girolamini.

== Works ==
- Lettera in difesa della moderna filosofia e de' coltivatori di essa, 1691.
- Historia filosofica, 1697–1704.
