= Matteo Egizio =

Italian historian (1674–1745)

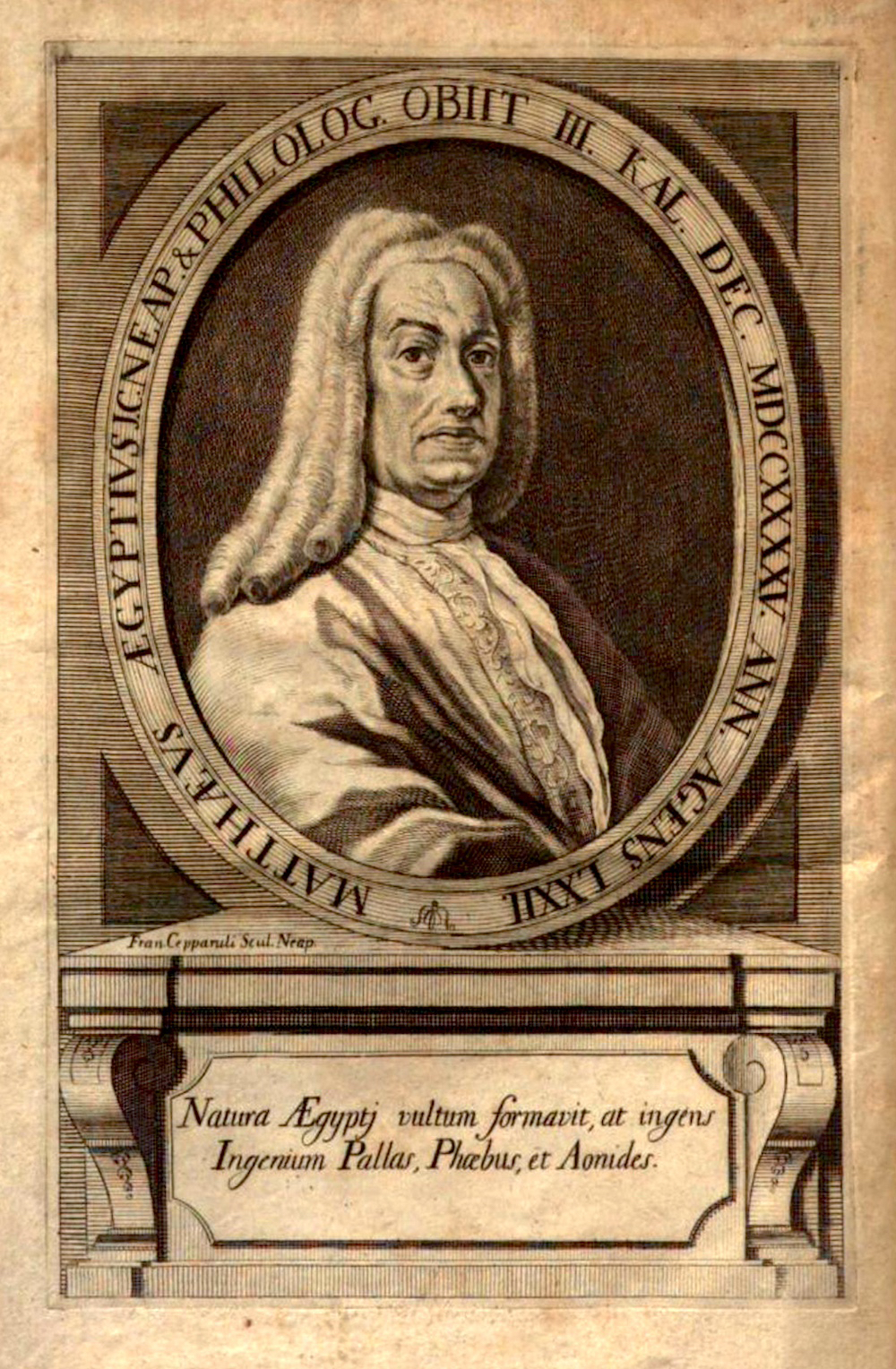
Matteo Egizio

Matteo Egizio (23 January 1674– 29 November 1745) was an Italian historian, librarian, numismatist and scholar.

== Life ==
He was born in Naples to a family that had originated in Gravina di Puglia. His father worked for the noblewoman Maria Milano, who encouraged Egizio towards studying classics. He then studied law, the subject in which he graduated. From a young age he divided his time between private tuition and attending Giuseppe Valletta's library, editing its catalogue.

He then became tutor to Antonio Carmine Caracciolo, prince of Torella, simultaneously becoming known for his knowledge of antiquities, so much so that he was often called on to interpret ancient coins and inscriptions and compose new inscriptions. He corresponded with Anton Francesco Gori, Scipione Maffei, Apostolo Zeno, Bernard de Montfaucon and other intellectuals of the era as well as joining Naples' Accademia degli Uniti and (with the pseudonym Timaste Pisandeo) Rome's Accademia dell'Arcadia and writing for the 'Giornale dei letterati'.

He moved in libertine and anticurialist circles but supported Naples' Bourbon rulers, leaving Naples after the Austrians' arrival in 1713 and moving to Amalfi. He later returned to live an isolated life in Naples, where he later died.

== Works ==
- Serie degl'imperadori romani distesa da Matteo Egizio. Per maggior lume della storia ecclesiastica e per servire come di supplemento, o di correzione al mermoriale cronologico di G. Marcello, Nuova stamperia di Francesco Laino, 1713.
- Opusculi volgari, e latini. Naples: A. Vocola. 1751.

== Bibliography ==
- Ceresa, Massimo (1993). "EGIZIO, Matteo". Dizionario Biografico degli Italiani (in Italian). Vol. 42: Dugoni–Enza. Rome: Istituto dell'Enciclopedia Italiana. ISBN 978-88-12-00032-6.
