= Dirck Hendricksz =

Dutch-Italian painter

Dirck Hendricksz (Amsterdam, 1544 – Amsterdam, 1618) was a Dutch-Italian painter. In Italy he was known as Teodoro d'Errico or Dirk Hendrici. He was engaged in painting mainly altarpieces and for churches in Naples from 1574 to 1606. Although born in Holland, he is referred in texts as a Flemish painter.

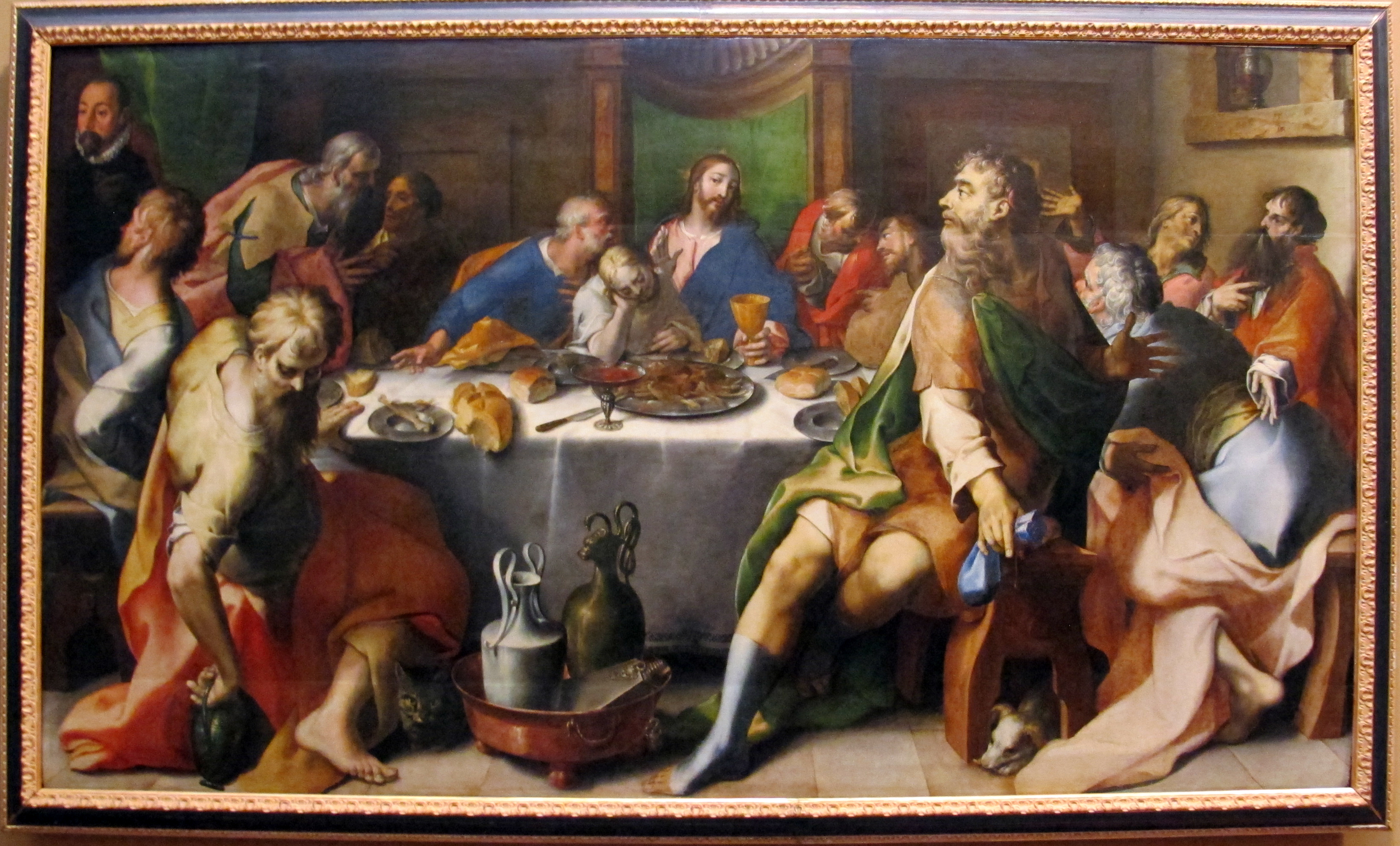
Last Supper

== Biography ==
His style shows the influence of Pieter Aertsen and Franz Floris. His presence in Rome is documented by 1568, where they likely met Jean Soens and Bartholomeus Spranger, who worked for the Zuccari brothers. By 1573, he had painted the Madonna delle Grazie and Saints for the church of San Severo all Sanita. He was a witness at the marriage of the Flemish painter Cornelis Smet. Dirck participated in the decoration of the ceiling of San Gregorio Armeno. In the 1580s he painted a Last Supper for the church of Sant'Eligio ai Vergini. In 1587–1589, he helps decorate the ceiling of the church of Donnaromita. His canvas of The Ascension for the church of San Domenico Maggiore dates from 1605 to 1606. His son Giovan Luca (died 1609) was also a painter in Naples. Dirck moved to Amsterdam in 1610.

== Gallery ==
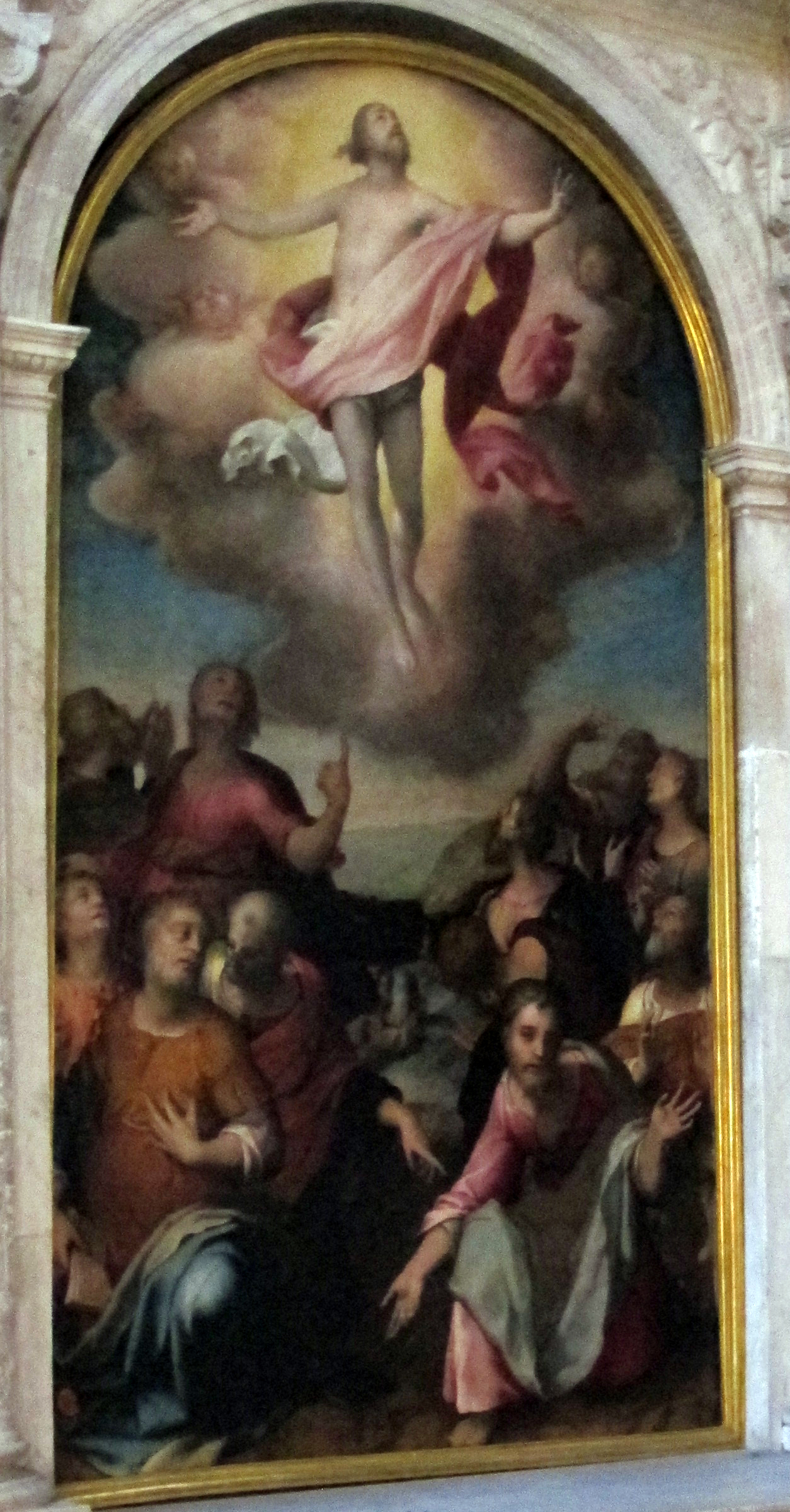
Ascension

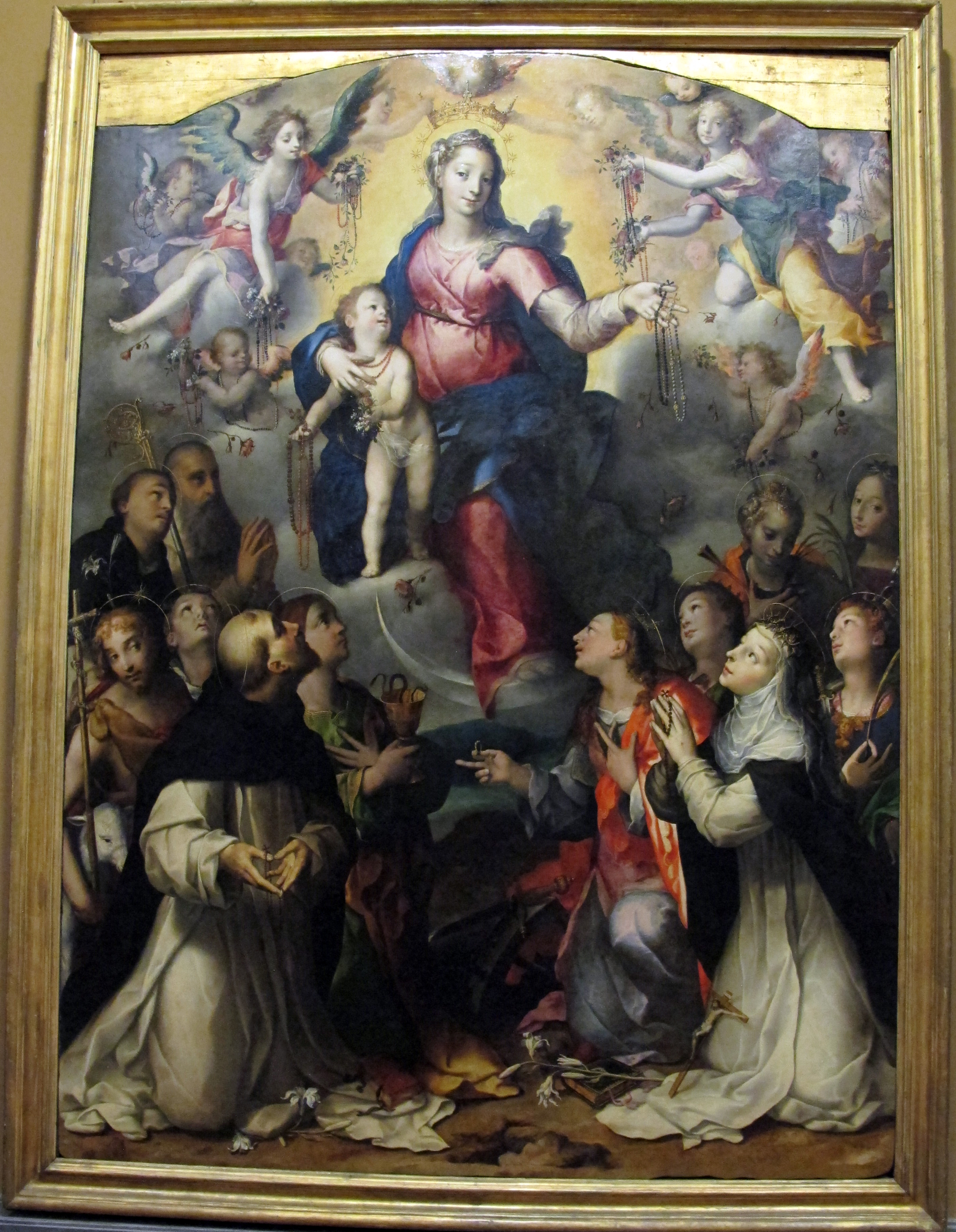
Madonna of the Rosary

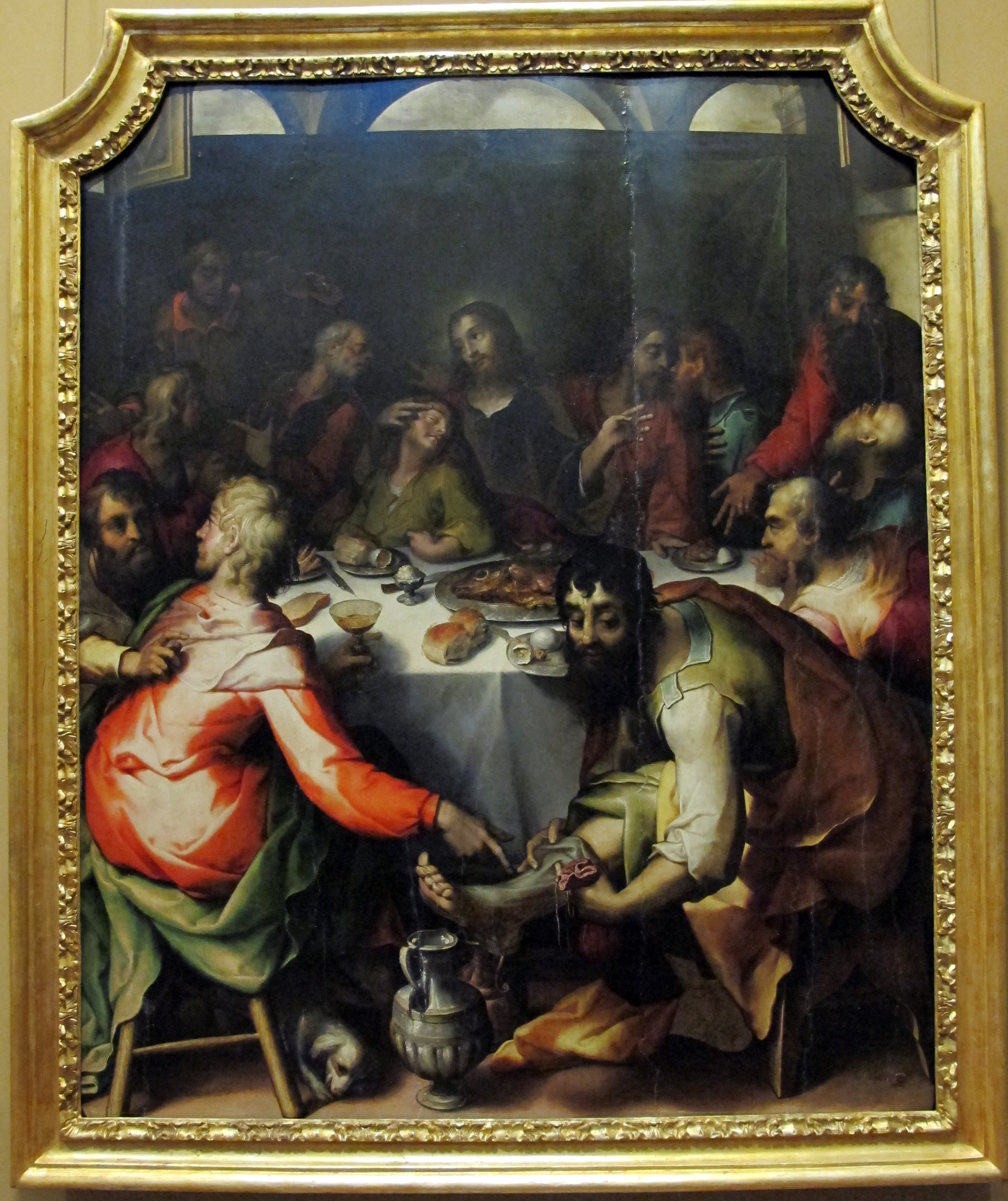
Last Supper from Sant'Eligio ai Vergini

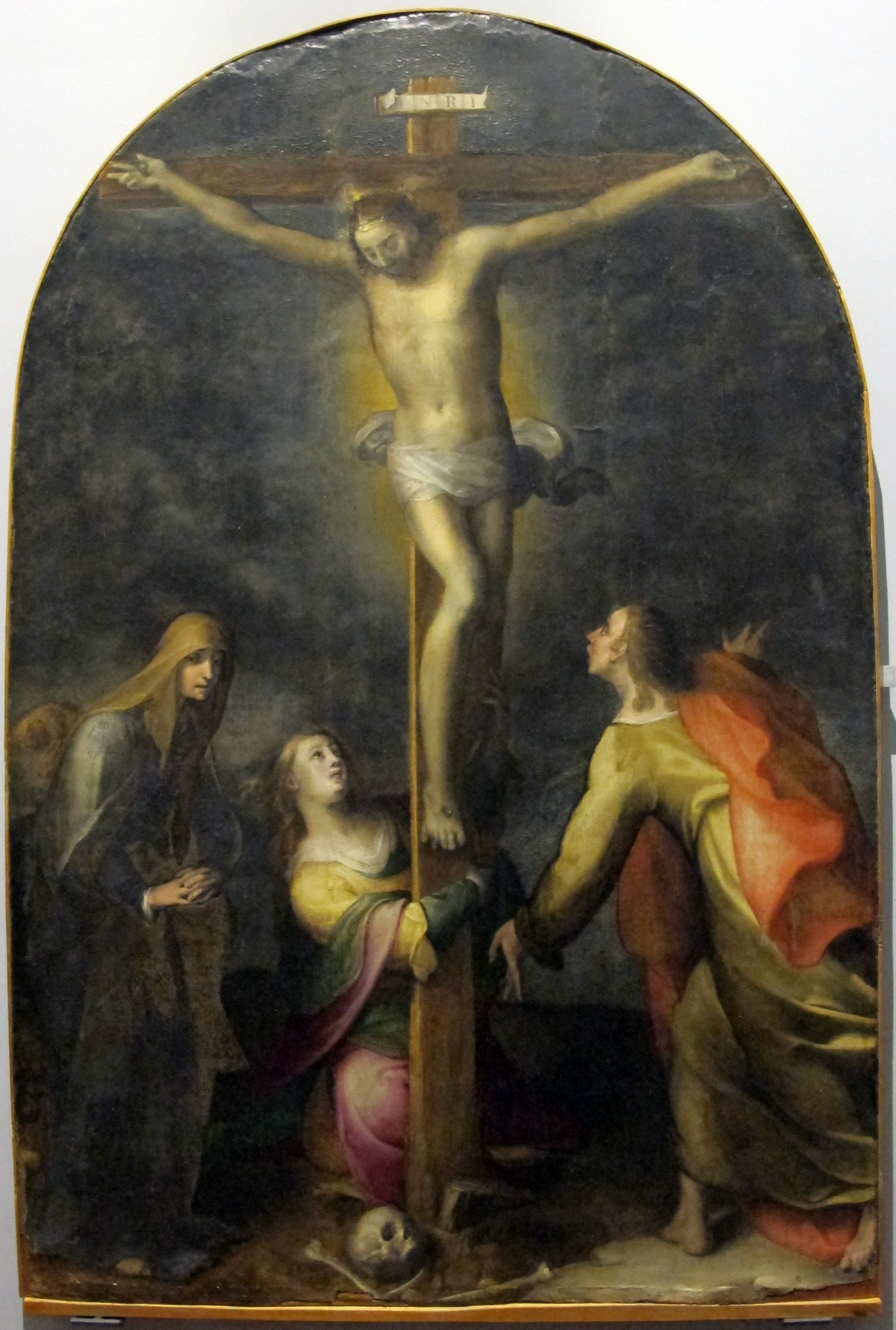
Crucifixion
