= Pietro Ghetti =

Italian sculptor

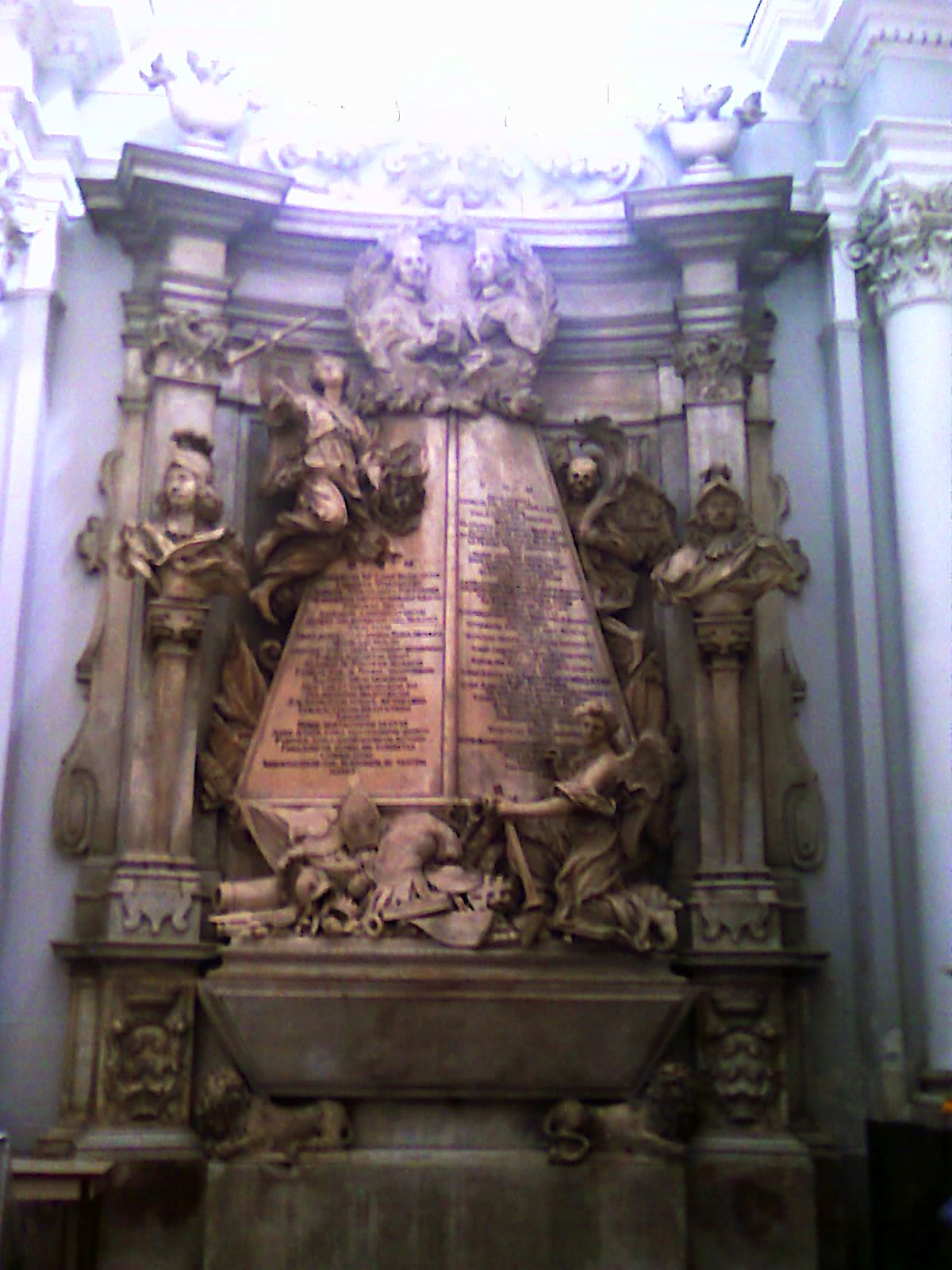
The Brancaccio tomb monument

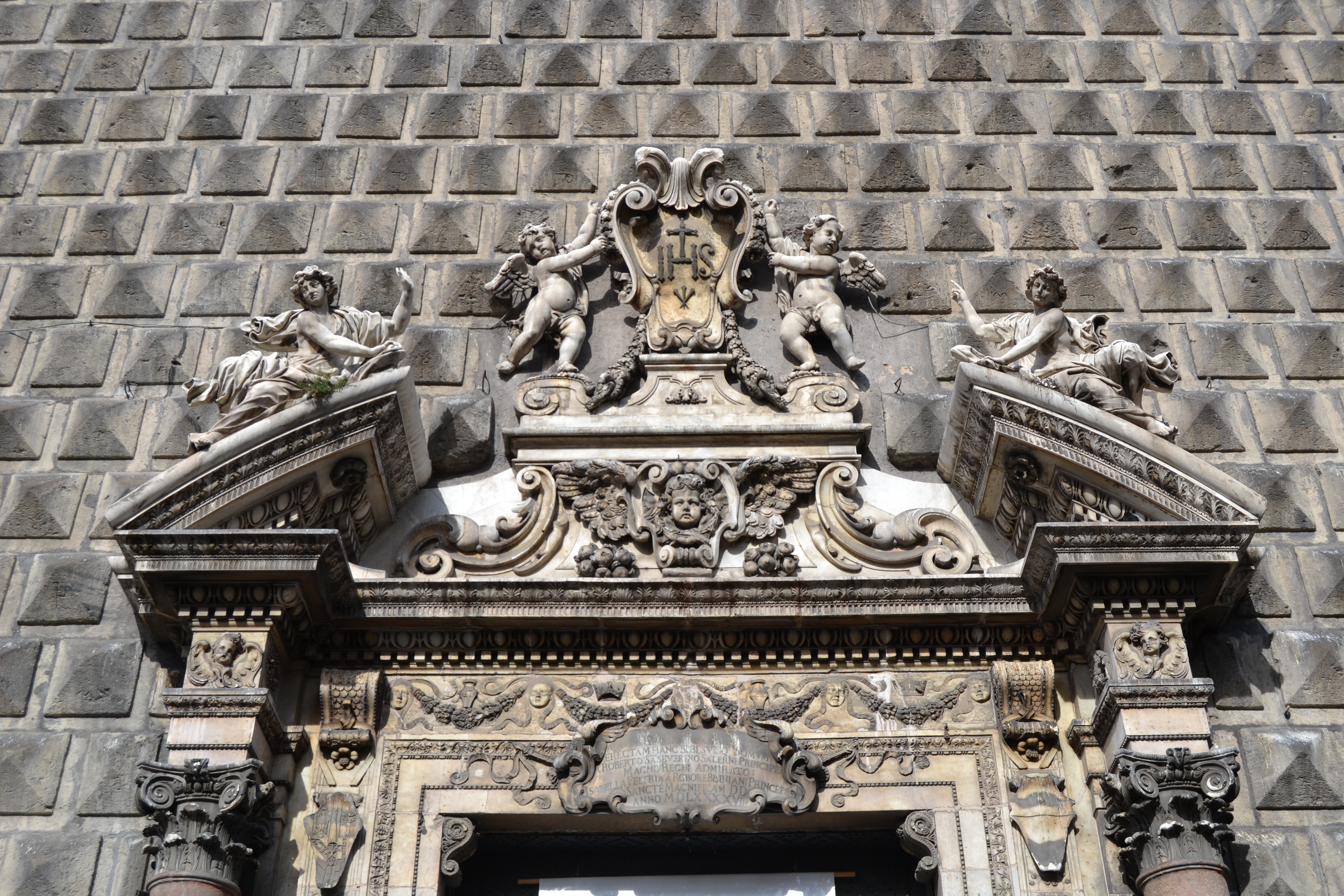
Doorway by the Ghetti brothers at Gesù Nuovo

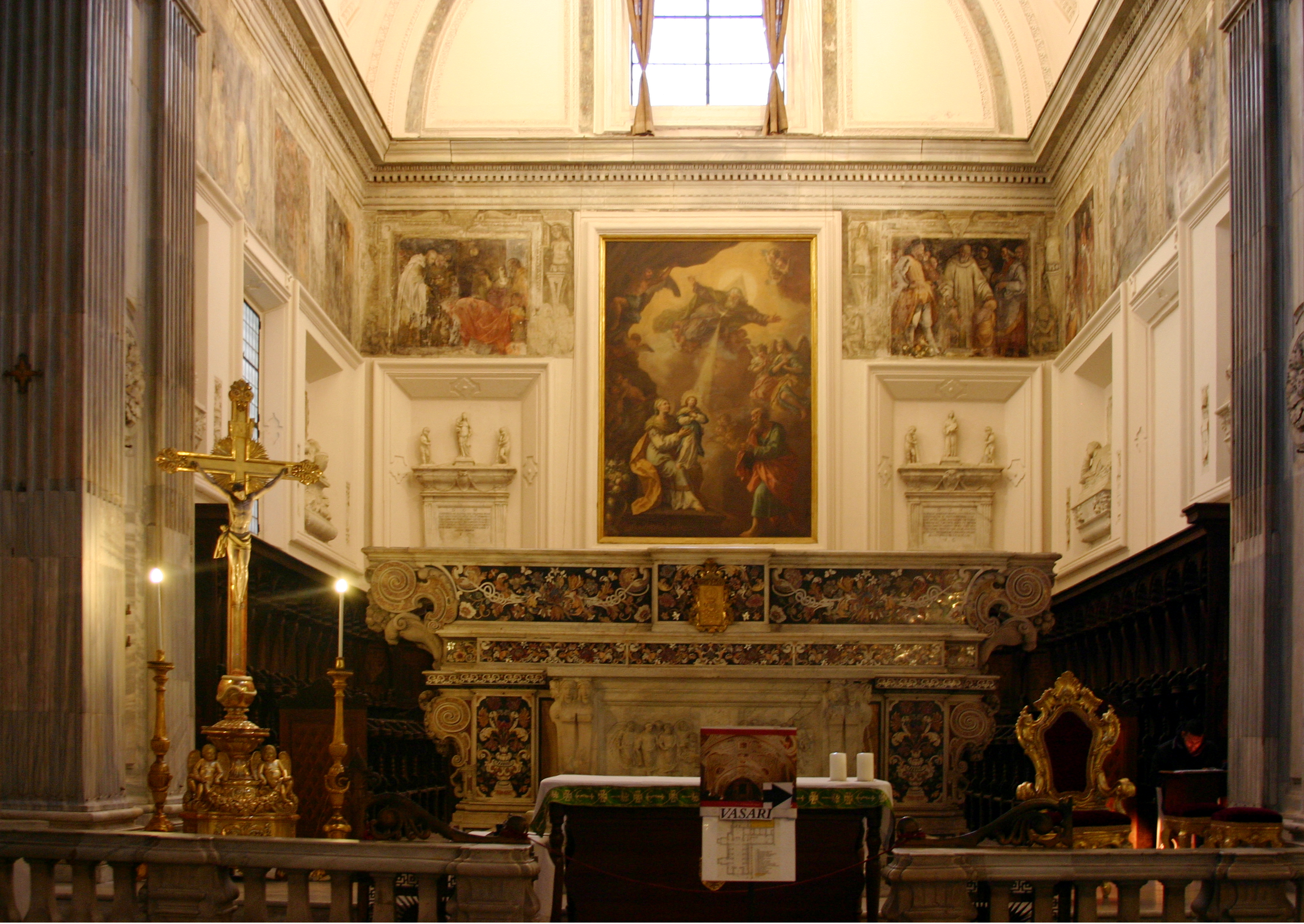
High altar at Monteoliveto

Pietro Ghetti (died c. 1726, Naples) was an Italian sculptor. Born in Carrara of Roman descent sometime in the 17th century, he trained in Bernini's workshop and often collaborated with his brother Bartolomeo as well as working independently. Scholars believe that Bartolomeo usually worked on ornament whilst Pietro usually worked on sculpting the figures.

== Life ==
He is documented as working in Naples from 1671 onwards, having followed Bernini's architect and sculptor brother Luigi to the city.

== Bibliography (in Italian) ==
- Vincenzo Rizzo, Lorenzo e Domenico Antonio Vaccaro. Apoteosi di un binomio, Napoli, Altrastampa, 2001.
- Vincenzo Rizzo, Ferdinandus Sanfelicius Architectus Neapolitanus, Napoli 1999.
- Vincenzo Rizzo, Contributo alla conoscenza di Bartolomeo e Pietro G., in Antologia di belle arti, Napoli, 1984.
- F. Abbate, La scultura del Seicento a Napoli, Torino, 1997.
