= Domenico Brandi =

Italian painter (1683–1736)

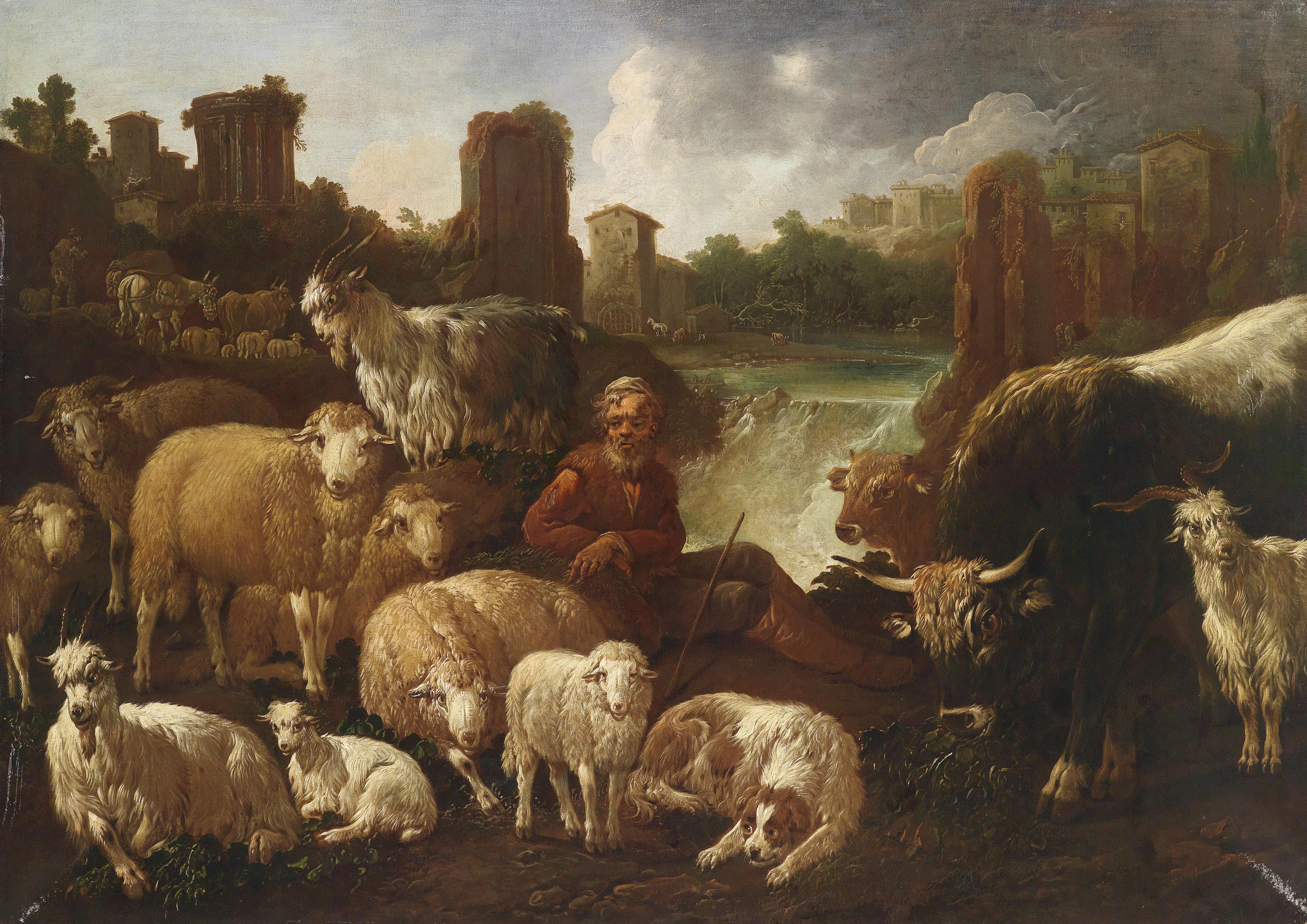
Shepherds and Their Flock by Domenico Brandi, 1736

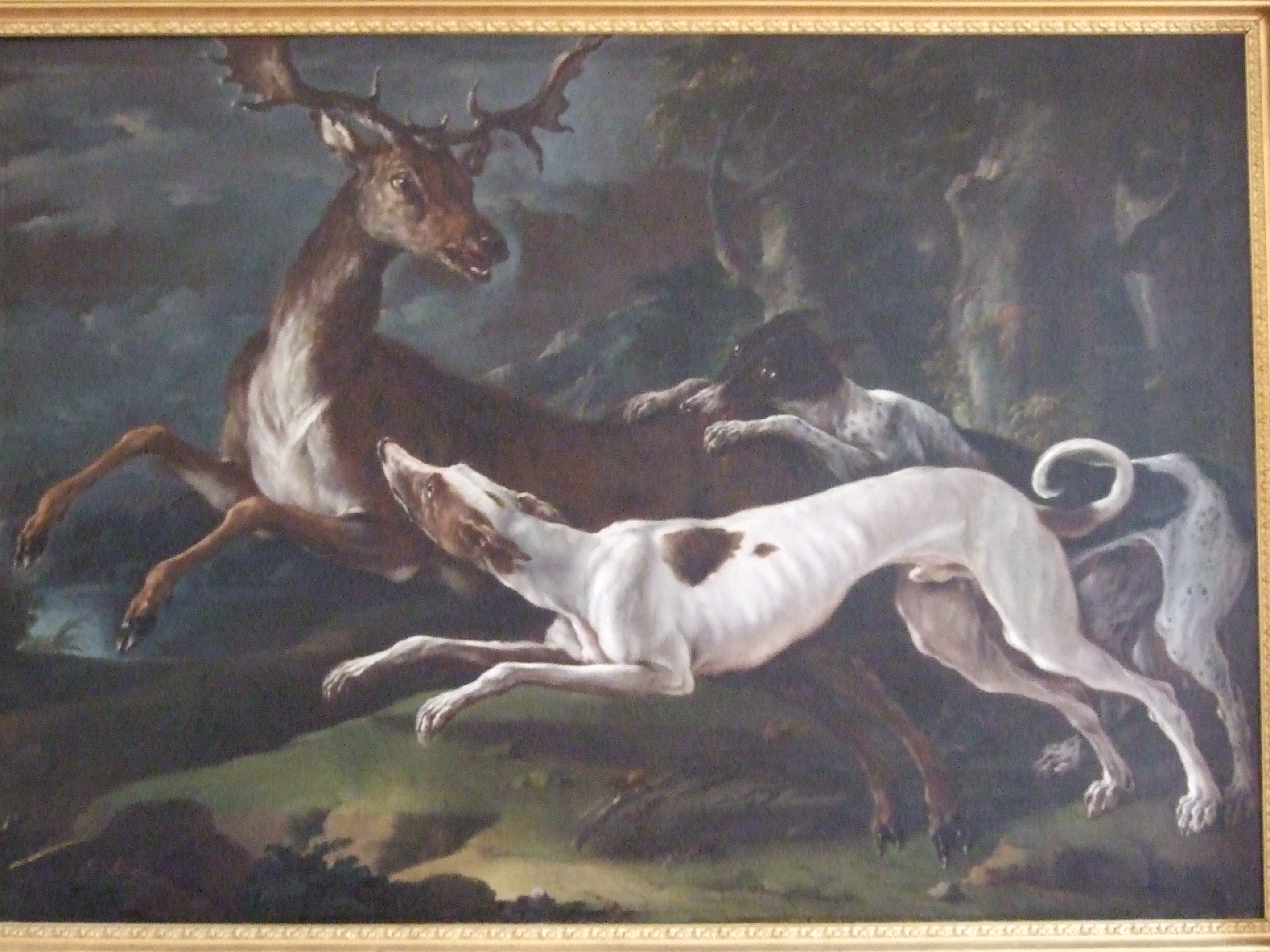

Domenico Brandi (1683–1736) was an Italian painter, active in his native Naples, where he painted still lifes of birds and animals, as well as pastoral landscapes (vedute) and a bambocciata. He was the son of the painter Gaetano Brandi, and Domenico initially trained with his uncle, Niccola Maria Rossi, in Naples. He later moved to work under Benedetto Luti in Rome. He was a painter to the Viceroy d'Harrach of Naples, and died in the latter city.
