= Leonardo Di Capua =

Italian scientist and physician

Leonardo Di Capua (Bagnoli Irpino, August 10, 1617 - Naples, June 17, 1695) was an Italian physician, scientist, and philosopher. Committed to research and experimentation, in contrast to the old school leaders such as Aristotle, Hippocrates, Galen, and others, he was the head of an academy called the "Investiganti".

== Articles ==
In 1681, he published the "Parere", supporting the ideas of those who opposed medical and scientific research to traditional knowledge.

== Award ==
The municipality of Bagnoli Irpino (Italy) established the Leonardo Di Capua national award in 2023, which is awarded annually to scientists who have distinguished themselves for their scientific research. Recipients of the award:

- 2023 Adriana Albini
- 2024 Carmen Criscitiello
- 2025 Sabatino D'Archi
- 2026 Matteo Bassetti
