= Bartolomeo Ghetti (sculptor) =

Italian sculptor

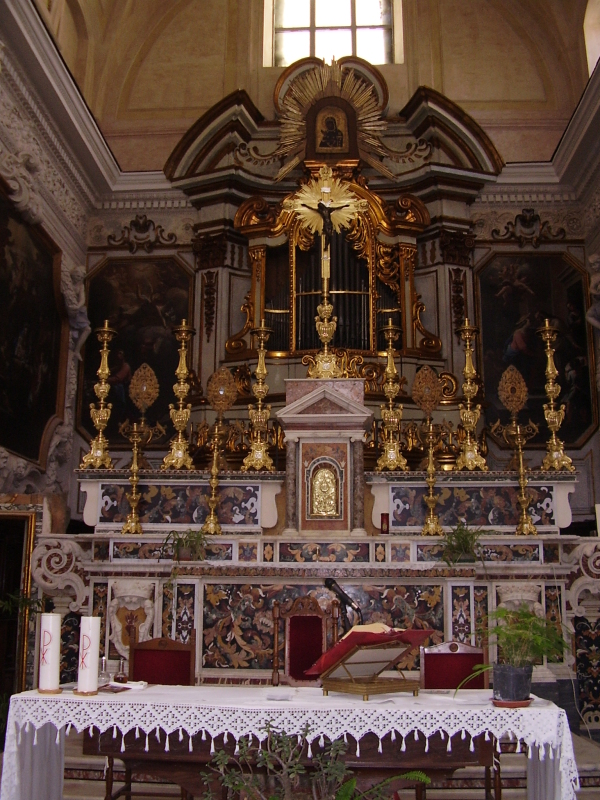
High altarpiece in Santa Maria della Verità, with the reproductions of the altar front and the other stolen marble work.

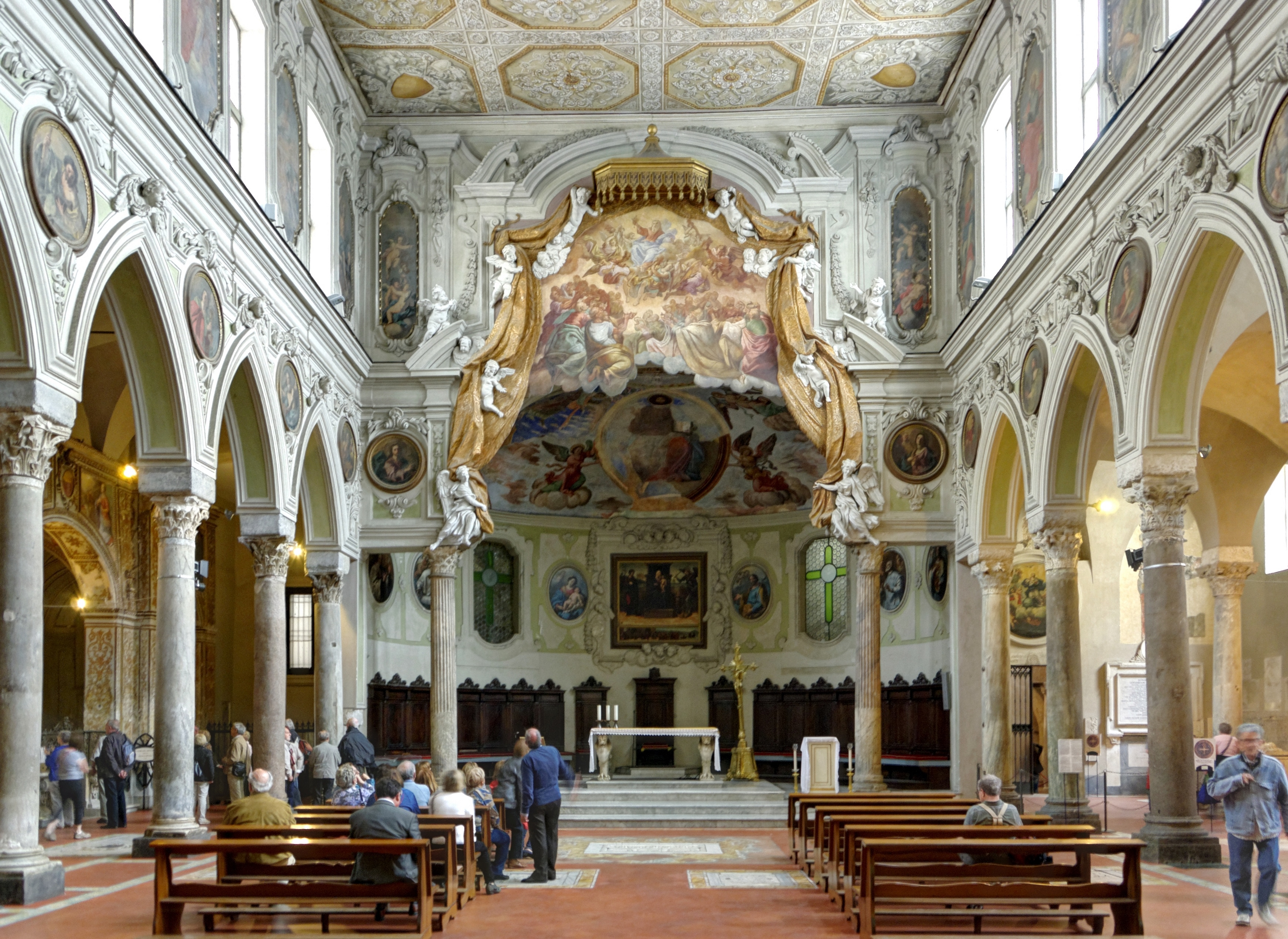
Drapery of the Guglielmelli with collaboration from the Ghetti brothers and Vaccaro, Santa Restituta.

Bartolomeo Ghetti (died c. 1708, Naples) was an Italian sculptor. Born in Carrara of Roman descent sometime in the 17th century, he trained in Bernini's workshop and often collaborated with his brother Pietro as well as working independently. Scholars believe that Bartolomeo usually worked on ornament whilst Pietro usually worked on sculpting the figures.

== Life ==
He is documented as working in Naples from 1671 onwards, having followed Bernini's architect and sculptor brother Luigi to the city.

== Bibliography (in Italian) ==
- Vincenzo Rizzo, Lorenzo e Domenico Antonio Vaccaro. Apoteosi di un binomio, Napoli, Altrastampa, 2001.
- Vincenzo Rizzo, Ferdinandus Sanfelicius Architectus Neapolitanus, Napoli 1999.
- Vincenzo Rizzo, Contributo alla conoscenza di Bartolomeo e Pietro G., in Antologia di belle arti, Napoli, 1984
- F. Abbate, La scultura del Seicento a Napoli, Torino, 1997
