= Accademia Ercolanese =

Italian archaeological academy

The Accademia Ercolanese (English: Herculaneum Academy), originally the Regale Accademia Ercolanese (Royal Herculaneum Academy), is an Italian archaeological academy founded in Naples in 1755 by Charles of Bourbon, then King of Naples and Sicily, for the study, publication and illustration of antiquities being unearthed from the cities buried by the eruption of Mount Vesuvius in AD 79, principally Pompeii and Herculaneum, from which the academy takes its name.

The academy was established with a deliberately restricted membership, without the corresponding or honorary members commonly found in other learned societies of the period. Initially it had no formal statutes, although its purpose and functions were set out in the royal act establishing it.

After a long period of inactivity, the academy was revived in December 1996. Its headquarters are in Ercolano, at Corso Resina 296.

== History ==
=== The excavations and foundation under Charles of Bourbon ===
In 1734 Charles of Bourbon became King of Naples and Sicily. Near Portici, where the king had commissioned the construction of the Royal Palace of Portici, ancient remains had previously been discovered. Charles ordered the excavations to be resumed, and work began again in the first days of 1738.

The excavations produced numerous objects, statues and inscriptions. As the work expanded, the site was identified as the ancient city of Herculaneum. Following the success of the excavations there, archaeological work was also intensified at Pompeii.

As finds continued to emerge from both cities, a museum was established at the Royal Palace of Portici in 1751 to house the growing collection. Specialists were brought to Naples to work on the material: Giuseppe Canart was employed in the restoration of marble sculptures, Tommaso Valenziani in the restoration of bronzes, while the Piarist priest Antonio Piaggio worked on the difficult task of unrolling and deciphering the Herculaneum papyri.

In 1747 the scholar Ottavio Antonio Bayardi was invited to interpret and publish the ancient monuments and moved to the Kingdom of Naples. Bayardi embarked upon an extensive work beginning with the earliest traditions concerning Herculaneum. After several years he had published only part of his Prodromo delle antichità di Ercolano, including an extensive treatment of the life of Heracles. He subsequently issued a catalogue of the excavated monuments, but the archaeological finds themselves still lacked the systematic scholarly publication desired by the royal court and the wider learned community.

On the advice of his minister Bernardo Tanucci, Charles therefore decided to establish an academy specifically charged with interpreting and publishing the monuments recovered from the excavations. The Regale Accademia Ercolanese was founded on 13 December 1755.

The academy consisted of fifteen scholars and met every two weeks at the Secretariat of State of the Royal Household under Tanucci's presidency. The original members were:

- Ottavio Antonio Bayardi
- Alessio Simmaco Mazzocchi
- Giacomo Castelli
- Salvatore D'Aula
- Pasquale Carcani
- Ferdinando Galiani
- Francesco Grassi, Count of Pianura
- Girolamo Giordano
- Giovanni Maria Della Torre
- Francesco Maria Tarugi
- Francesco Valletta
- Francesco Maria Pratilli
- Domenico Ronchi
- Mattia Zarrillo
- Niccola Ignarra

After the deaths of two members, Berardo Galiani and Giovan Battista Basso-Bassi subsequently joined the academy.

Francesco Valletta was initially chosen as perpetual secretary. Because of his advanced age and poor health, however, the office was subsequently entrusted to Pasquale Carcani.

=== Publications ===
One of the academy's principal undertakings was Le Antichità di Ercolano Esposte, the monumental series illustrating the discoveries of the Bourbon excavations. Published by the Royal Printing House in Naples between 1757 and 1792, the series comprised eight volumes.

Despite its title, the publication was not restricted to Herculaneum, but also presented antiquities discovered at Pompeii, Stabiae and other sites excavated under the Bourbons around the Gulf of Naples. Its engraved illustrations and scholarly commentary played an important role in disseminating knowledge of the Vesuvian discoveries throughout Europe.

=== Reconstitution under Ferdinand IV ===
Over the following decades many members of the academy died, including its secretary Pasquale Carcani, while Tanucci's governmental responsibilities increasingly occupied his attention. The academy's work eventually came to a halt for several years.

On 15 April 1787, Ferdinand IV of Naples, acting on the advice of the minister Domenico Caracciolo, reconstituted the academy and appointed replacements for the deceased members.

The surviving members of the earlier academy were:

- Ferdinando Galiani
- Niccola Ignarra
- Mattia Zarrillo
- Giovan Battista Basso-Bassi

Basso-Bassi served as secretary during this phase. The newly appointed members were:

- Francesco La Vega
- Emmanuele Campolongo
- Saverio Gualtieri
- Pasquale Baffi
- Michele Arditi
- Andrea Federici
- Domenico Diodati
- Gaetano Rinforzi-Carcani
- Saverio Mattei
- Carlo Rosini
- Francesco Daniele

After three of these members died, they were succeeded by Filippo Mazzocchi, a nephew of Alessio Simmaco Mazzocchi, Michele Arcangelo Lupoli and Vincenzo Calà.

For the first time the reconstituted academy was governed by a formal statute. It consisted of twelve articles and was approved by Ferdinand IV on 10 May 1787.

In accordance with the seventh article, the academy subsequently proposed the historiographer Francesco Daniele as perpetual secretary, and his appointment was confirmed by the king.

=== Nineteenth century ===
As a consequence of the political upheavals at the end of the eighteenth century, the academy ceased to meet after 1798 and disappeared from the official records of the Neapolitan royal court until 1806.

During the period of French rule in Naples the institution operated in a modified form. Following the Bourbon Restoration, in 1816 it became one of the three academies forming the Società Reale Borbonica (Royal Bourbon Society), alongside the Academy of Sciences and the Academy of Fine Arts. The Accademia Ercolanese di Archeologia consisted of twenty ordinary members and could also include Italian and foreign corresponding members.

From 1822 the academy published the Memorie della Regale Accademia Ercolanese di Archeologia, containing scholarly contributions by its members. The series was published in Naples between 1822 and 1862 and comprised nine volumes.

Among the principal ordinary members and scholars associated with the study and interpretation of the Herculaneum papyri during this period were:

- Francesco Maria Avellino
- Giuseppe Capecelatro
- Giuseppe Castaldi
- Giacomo Castrucci
- Luigi Caterino
- Andrea de Jorio
- Salvatore Cirillo
- Gaetano d'Ancora
- Prospero de Rosa
- Giovanni Battista Finati
- Agostino Gervasio
- Gaetano Greco
- Raimondo Guarini
- Cataldo Iannelli
- Francesco Iavarone
- Antonio Ottaviano
- Giuseppe Maria Parascandolo
- Bartolomeo Pessetti
- Giustino Quadrari
- Bernardo Quaranta
- Giovanni Rossi
- Angelo Antonio Scotti
- Gaspare Selvaggi

== Modern academy ==
The Accademia Ercolanese was revived in December 1996 on the initiative of Aniello De Rosa, with the stated aim of promoting cultural activity in Ercolano and the wider Vesuvian area and preserving awareness of the historical and archaeological heritage of Herculaneum, Pompeii, Oplontis, Stabiae and Paestum.

Since its revival, the academy has organized conferences and promoted publications concerning the history, archaeology and modern reception of Herculaneum and Pompeii.

In 2011 the academy signed an agreement intended to extend its academic activities internationally, including the annual recognition of a doctoral thesis from China.

On 13 December 2025 the academy marked the 270th anniversary of its foundation with a symposium at the Royal Palace of Portici. The programme included contributions concerning archaeological excavation, restoration and international cooperation.

== Euromediterranean Prize ==
Since 2006 the academy has awarded the Euromediterranean Prize (Italian: Premio Euromediterraneo) to figures from academic, institutional, cultural and public life. The award was not presented in 2019 or 2020. In later editions its scope was extended beyond southern Italy.

The recipients listed by the academy include:

- 2006 – Luigi Nicolais, then Minister for Research and Innovation
- 2007 – Admiral Roberto Cesaretti
- 2008 – Guido Trombetti, rector of the University of Naples Federico II
- 2009 – Francesco Rossi, rector of the Second University of Naples
- 2010 – Cardinal Crescenzio Sepe
- 2011 – Corrado Lembo, public prosecutor
- 2012 – Paolo Masi, dean of the Faculty of Agriculture of the University of Naples Federico II
- 2013 – Pietro Grasso, President of the Italian Senate
- 2014 – Luigi Carrino, president of the Italian Aerospace Research Centre
- 2015 – Pietro Perlingieri
- 2016 – Gaetano Manfredi, then rector of the University of Naples Federico II and president of the Conference of Italian University Rectors
- 2017 – Giuseppe Paolisso, rector of the University of Campania Luigi Vanvitelli
- 2018 – Sergio Costa, then Minister of the Environment
- 2021 – Luigi Di Maio, then Minister of Foreign Affairs and International Cooperation
- 2022 – Dario Franceschini, then Minister of Culture
- 2024 – Matteo Lorito, rector of the University of Naples Federico II
- 2026 – Giovanni Francesco Nicoletti, rector of the University of Campania Luigi Vanvitelli
- 2026 – Roberta Metsola, President of the European Parliament

== See also ==
- Excavations of Pompeii
- Excavations of Herculaneum
- Herculaneum papyri
- Le Antichità di Ercolano Esposte

== Bibliography ==
- Castaldi, Giuseppe (1840). Della Regale Accademia Ercolanese dalla sua fondazione sinora con un cenno biografico de' suoi soci ordinari. Naples: Tipografia di Porcelli.
- De Tipaldo, Emilio (1837). Biografia degli Italiani illustri nelle scienze, lettere ed arti del secolo XVIII, e de' contemporanei. Vol. 4. Venice: Alvisopoli.
- Memorie della Regale Accademia Ercolanese di Archeologia, Naples, 1822–1862.
