= Pacelli =

Pacelli (pronounced [paˈtʃɛlli]) is an Italian surname derived from the medieval given name Pacello. Notable people with the surname include:

- Asprilio Pacelli (1570–1623), Italian composer
- Ernesto Pacelli (died 1925), Vatican financial adviser, cousin of Pius XII
- Eugenio Pacelli (1876–1958), head of the Catholic Church as Pope Pius XII
- Francesco Pacelli (1872–1935), Vatican lawyer, elder brother of Pius XII
- Frank Pacelli (1924–1997), American TV personality
- James Martin Pacelli McGuinness (1950–2017), Irish politician and statesman
- Matteo Pacelli (died 1731), Italian painter
- Vincent "Vinny Basile" Pacelli, American Mafioso indicted in Operation Old Bridge
- William V. Pacelli (1893–1942), American politician

== See also ==
- Pacelli High School
- Cardinal Pacelli School
