= Our Lady of Montserrat Church, Madrid =

Church of Nuestra Señora de Montserrat
- Iglesia de Nuestra Señora de Montserrat (Spanish)
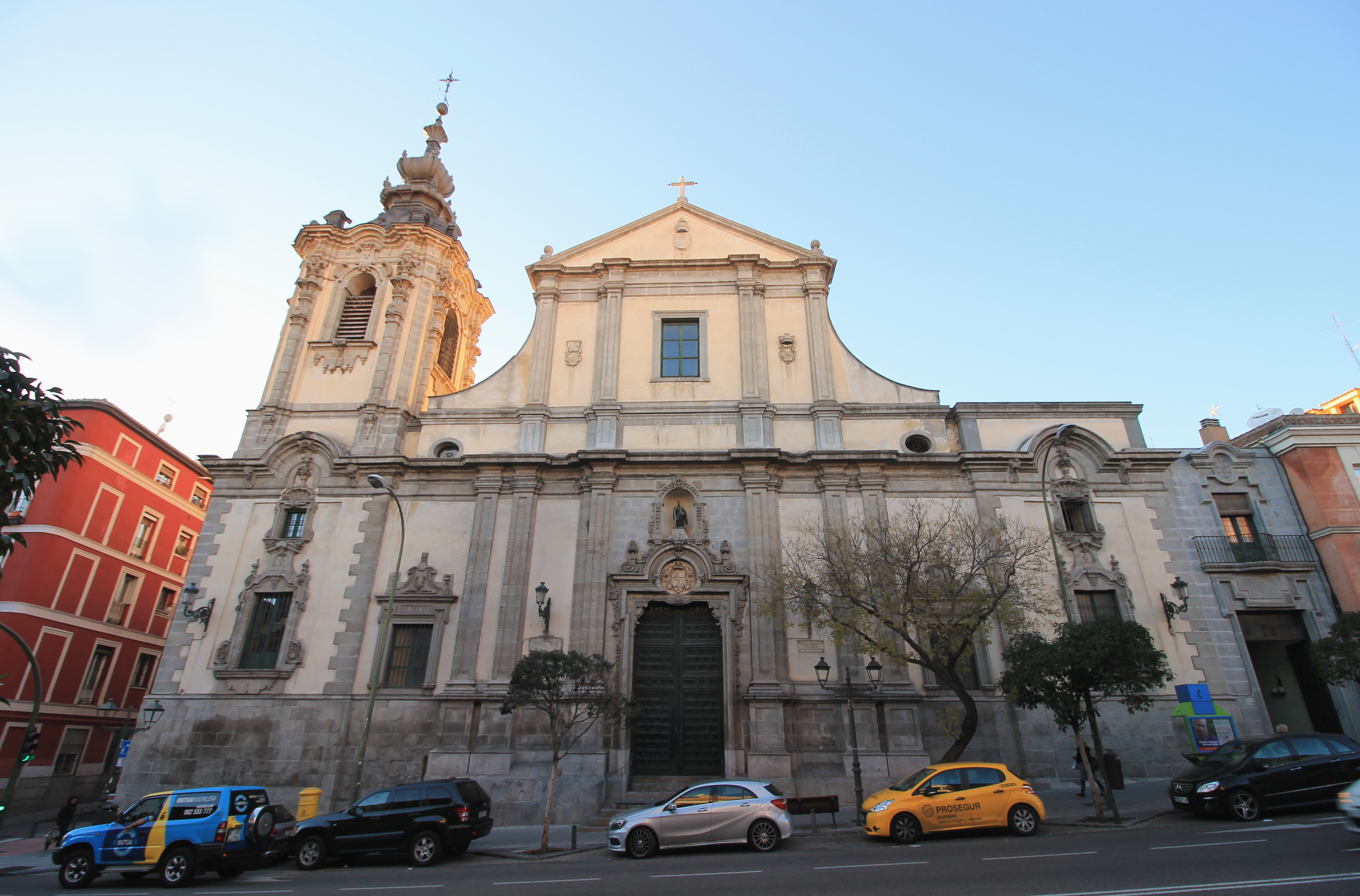

- Location within Spain
- 40.427619°N 3.706494°W
- Location: Madrid, Spain

Spanish Cultural Heritage
- Official name: Iglesia de Nuestra Señora de Montserrat
- Type: Non-movable
- Criteria: Monument
- Designated: 1914
- Reference no.: RI-51-0000136

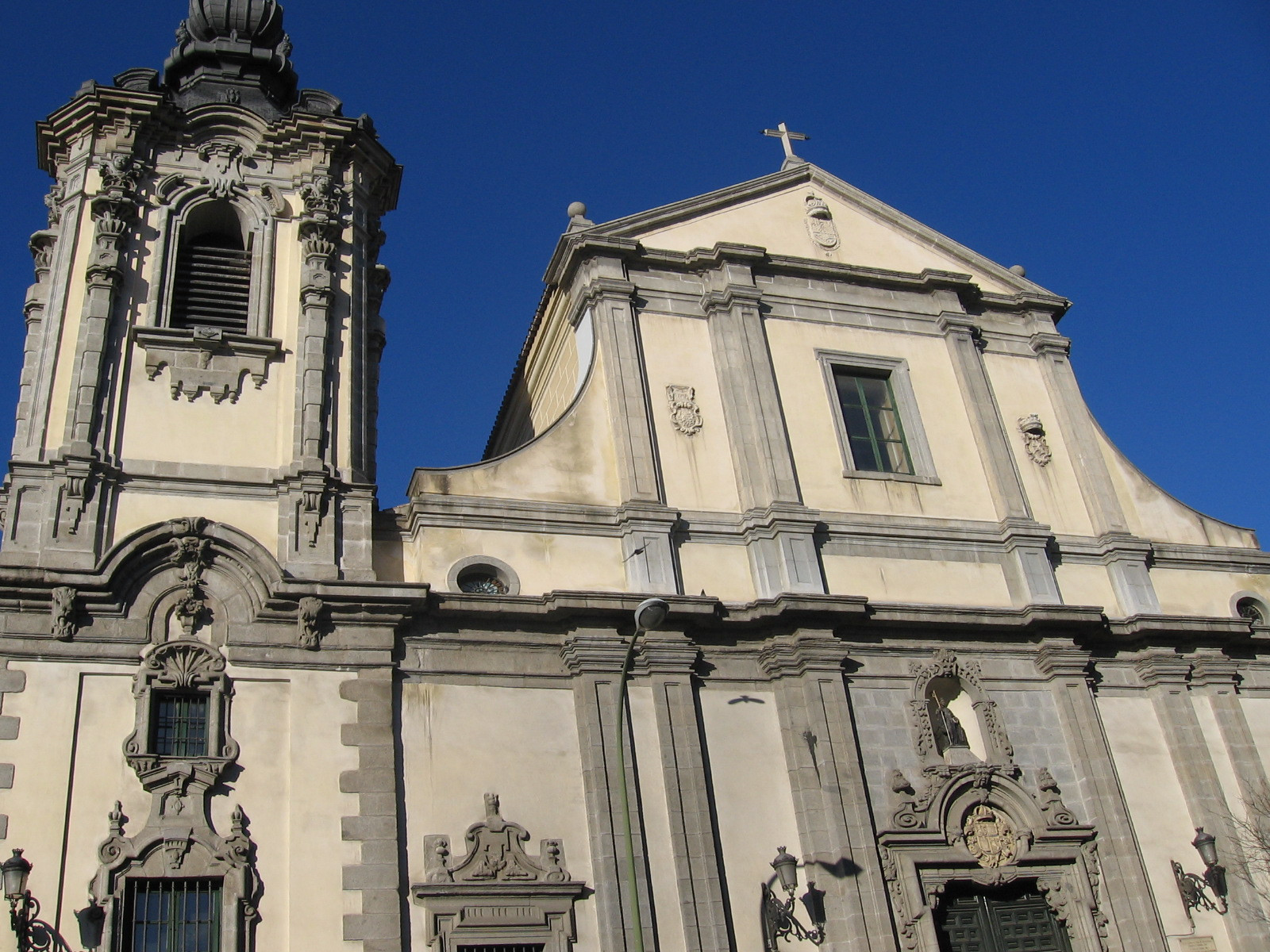
Principal facade.

The Church of Our Lady of Montserrat (Spanish: Nuestra Señora de Montserrat) is a Baroque-style, Roman Catholic church in central Madrid, Spain. Despite the imposing facade on Calle San Bernardo, the interior has relatively few bays because it was not possible to complete the building as originally projected.

== History ==
It was founded by Philip IV to host the Castilian monks from the Santa Maria de Montserrat Abbey (Catalonia) who came fleeing the Catalan Revolt. The Santa Maria de Montserrat Abbey was the main Benedictine center of Catalonia and had belonged to the Castilian jurisdiction of Valladolid since 1493, when Ferdinand II of Aragon sent 14 monks from Valladolid and made the abbey dependent on the congregation of this Castilian city. The Catalan monks, were unhappy that their abbot was almost always Castilian, and took the opportunity of the Revolt to oust the Castilian monks.

Work on the building did not begin until 1668, during the reign of Charles II, and was under the direction of Sebastián Herrera Barnuevo. The finance for the construction was provided by the illustrious Baron of Gilet, in the Kingdom of Valencia, Pedro Arnaldo Llansol de Romaní, following his elevation to Marquis of Llansol in 1690. The facade is clearly somewhat influenced by the famous Church of the Gesù of Vignola in Rome and is considered one of the most complex and elaborate buildings of the Madrilenian Baroque.

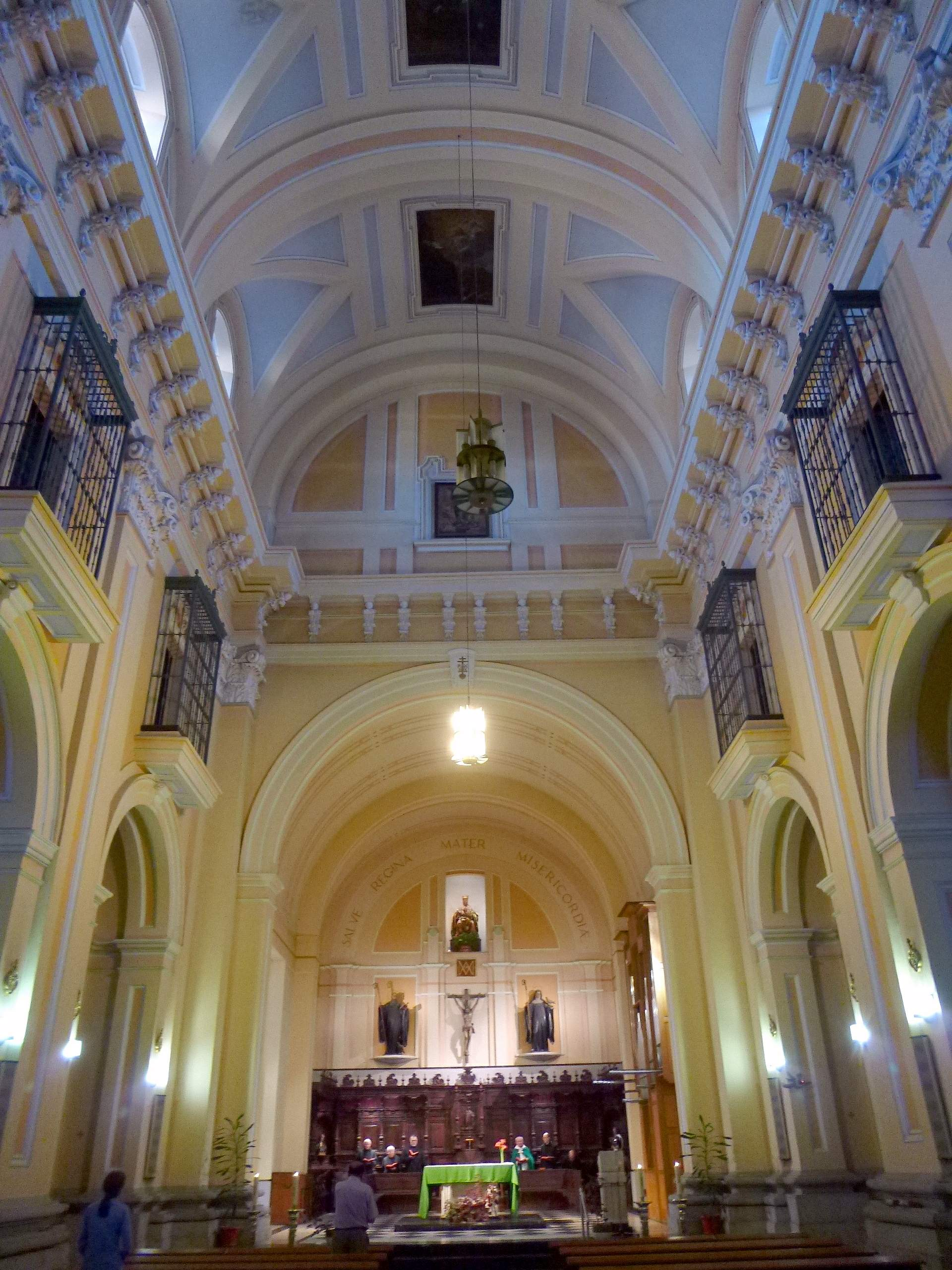
Aspect of inside the temple.

To compensate for the slope of the street, Herrera placed on a high base three narrow bodies with larger and smaller bodies pressed together. The pilasters are of Doric style, unfolding frequently. After the death of Herrera in 1671, Gaspar de la Peña will continue with the work without finishing the chancel and the main facade. The works will be abandoned until 1716 that takes Pedro de Ribera at the beginning of his career. Ribera respected the initial facade although redecorated the door and windows. It can see the difference between windows of Herrera and of Ribera and comparing the classic window of the central attic with the rest, adorned with tufts, scallops and other Riberan elements.

In the absence of the initial plans, it is unclear whether the two towers that were initially were contemplated, were due to Herrera. Anyway, its construction did not begin until 1729, starting with the tower of the side of the epistle, and in 1731 switched to lift the first body of the opposite side, concluding only the first in 1740. Characteristic work of the decorative dynamism of Pedro de Ribera topped with singular spire, giving the set the personality and harmony enough to enter in the history of Madrid's architecture. At its top is open on each side two semicircular windows flanked by striking estipites. The roof of the slate is crowned with a washer, a cap with a decorative bulb and the said spire, completed by a world globe with a cross.

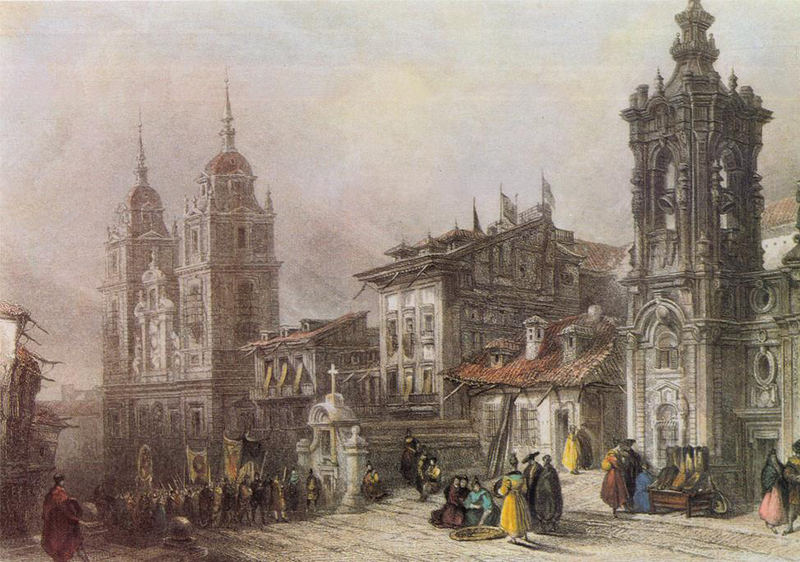
The street Calle Ancha de San Bernardo (Madrid) in the first third of the 19th century, with the Nuestra Señora de Montserrat to the right and the Oratorio de los Padres del Salvador del Mundo to the left (engraving by James B. Allen, based on an original drawing of the painter David Roberts, made during his trip to Spain in 1832–33).

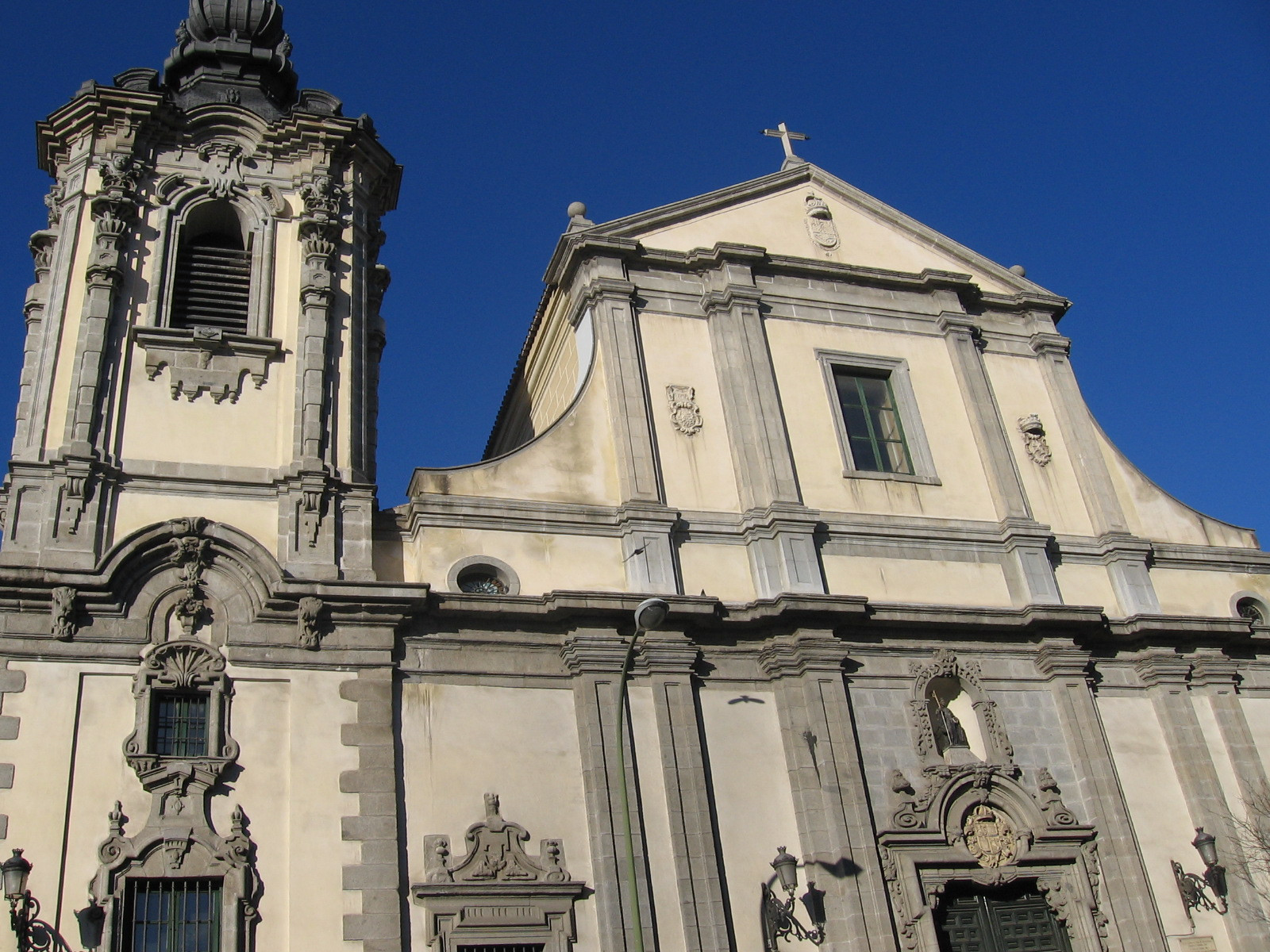
Detail of the main facade.

The temple only has at present the nave of the feet and its chapels. The remaining bases inside the monastery allow to recreate the plant of a great church that did not become complete. Various reasons were unable to gather the enormous resources to continue a work as ambitious. It missed build the great dome of the crossing, the header and the sacristies. Its current enclosure was made in 1986. The stylistic approach of the nave corresponds to an advanced stage of the Spanish Baroque of 17th century, consisting the Ribera's contribution in the ornamental coating.

The July 25, 1835 a decree of the Queen abolished all religious houses with less than twelve religious. Montserrat was closed along with other thousand Spanish monasteries and convents. The monastery became in 1837 in prison for women's with the nickname of Casa Galera, with which it became known during the 19th century In 1851 part of the monastery and church it gave to Sor Patrocinio and their Conceptionist nuns, who were expelled in 1868. In 1918 the church was ceded to the Benedictine monks of Abbey of Santo Domingo de Silos. The August 1, 1922 seven monks of Silos opened to worship the north nave of the church and in 1928 the entire church. The Spanish Civil War abruptly interrupted the life of the community. The monks sought refuge in friendly houses, the Popular Front transformed the church into a ballroom. Three monks were imprisoner, then taken to Alicante to save their lives. Four other monks were martyred. In 1939 again six monks of Silos occupy the monastery and in 1953 also delivers the rest of it that had been occupied by the women's prison. In 1988, during the Priory of Norberto Núñez, culminates a complete restoration of all the buildings under the direction of architects Antón Capitel, Antonio Riviere and Consuelo Martorell.

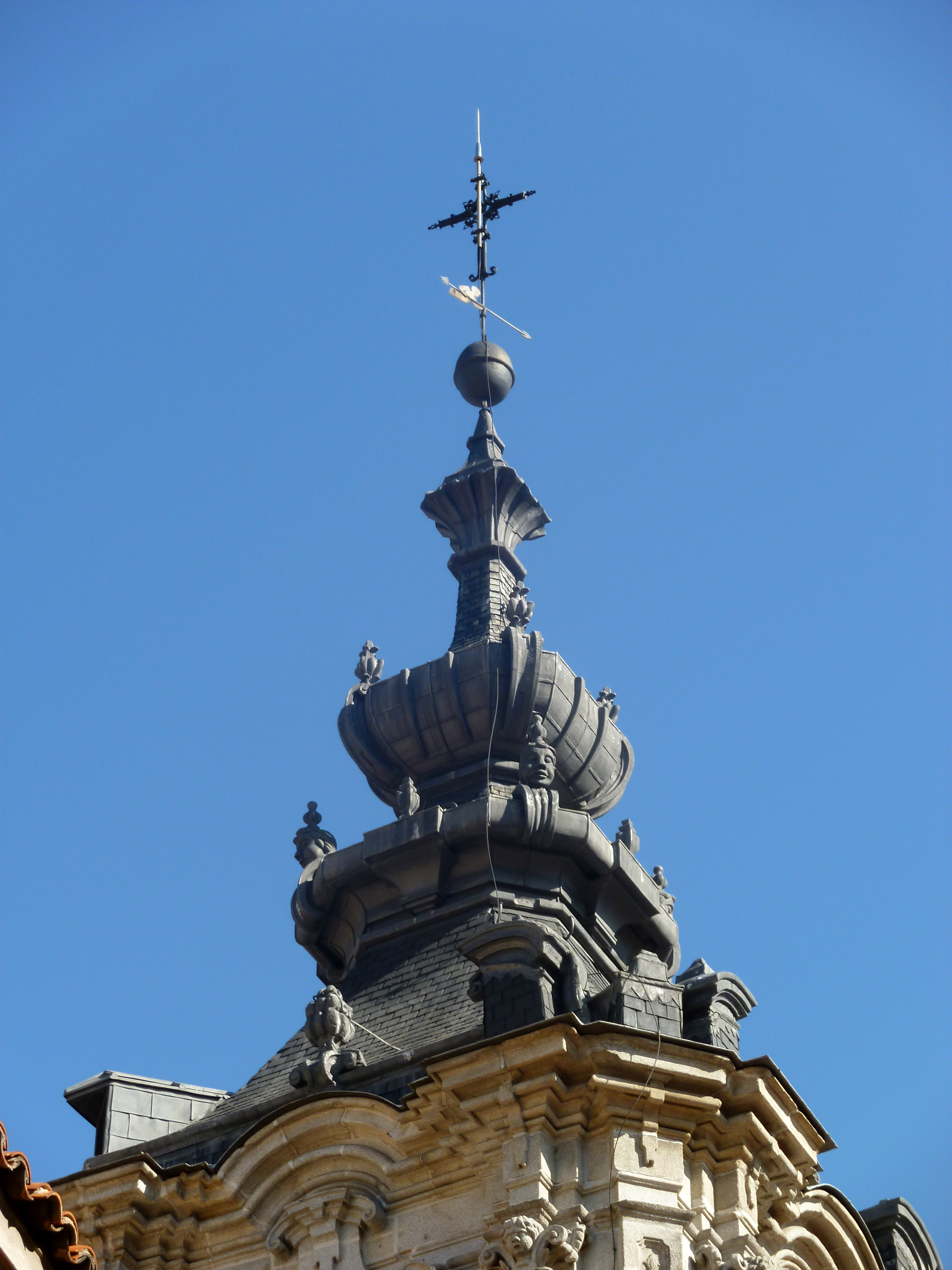
Pinnacle of the bell.

In its enclosure was buried the writer and Comendador of the Order of Calatrava, Luis de Salazar y Castro, whose very valuable archive is preserved in the monastery until 1835. At suppress it the monastery deleted those 49 volumes of documents its were taken to the Real Academia de la Historia.

Long ago it was customary to give a shout with the bells every day of the year in the evening, for the soul of Philip IV, as this is the time when it were told to the Benedictines the founder's death.

Known as "el montserratico" is a construction according to Professor Bonet is not architecture to be described and photographed, but to be seen.

== Art works ==
Antonio Palomino indicates that in one of its chapels it kept a wooden crucifix work by Alonso Cano, transferred during the Napoleonic invasion to the Real Academia de Bellas Artes de San Fernando, which in 1891 it ceded to the Capuchins of Lecároz, Navarre. The interior once held Alonso Cano's wooden statue of Christ de Burgos, now in the Academia de Bellas Artes de San Fernando. Currently has some artistic works of merit, highlighting a large canvas anonymous of the 18th century of curious Immaculate iconography and the sculpture of the head Virgin, attributed to Manuel Pereira. At the foot is a copy of the Christ of Burgos, popular sculpture of the 18th century. Like its model, the image has at its feet an ostrich eggs which, according to tradition, was an offering of a rich merchant of the Americas. In the novel "Miau" of Benito Pérez Galdós is told the fear imposed by this picture with its hair of natural hair.

The paintings of the vaults, stories of the life of Saint Benedict, were made in the early 18th century by Pedro de Calabria who also it commissioned the shields beneath the choir and a large painting of St. Basil, lost.

It also had a beautiful painting of Antonio Fernández Arias, given by the Duchess of Monteleón, representing the pharisees in the time of filing to Jesus the tribute penny. This painting is now in the Prado. Another image, highly revered in this house was that of Our Lady of Suffering.

== Current status ==
Currently the temple is used as a priory church by the Benedictines of Santo Domingo de Silos in the province of Burgos.

== See also ==
- Catholic Church in Spain
- List of oldest church buildings
