= Pacello =

Pacello (pronounced [paˈtʃɛllo]) is an Italian masculine given name, chiefly in use in the Middle Ages, and a surname. Notable people with the name include:

== Surnames ==
- Eleonoro Pacello (1643–1695), Italian Roman Catholic prelate

== First names ==
- Pacello da Mercogliano (c. 1455–1534), Italian-French garden designer and hydraulic engineer

== See also ==
- Pacelli
