= The Entombment (Giordano) =

Painting by Luca Giordano

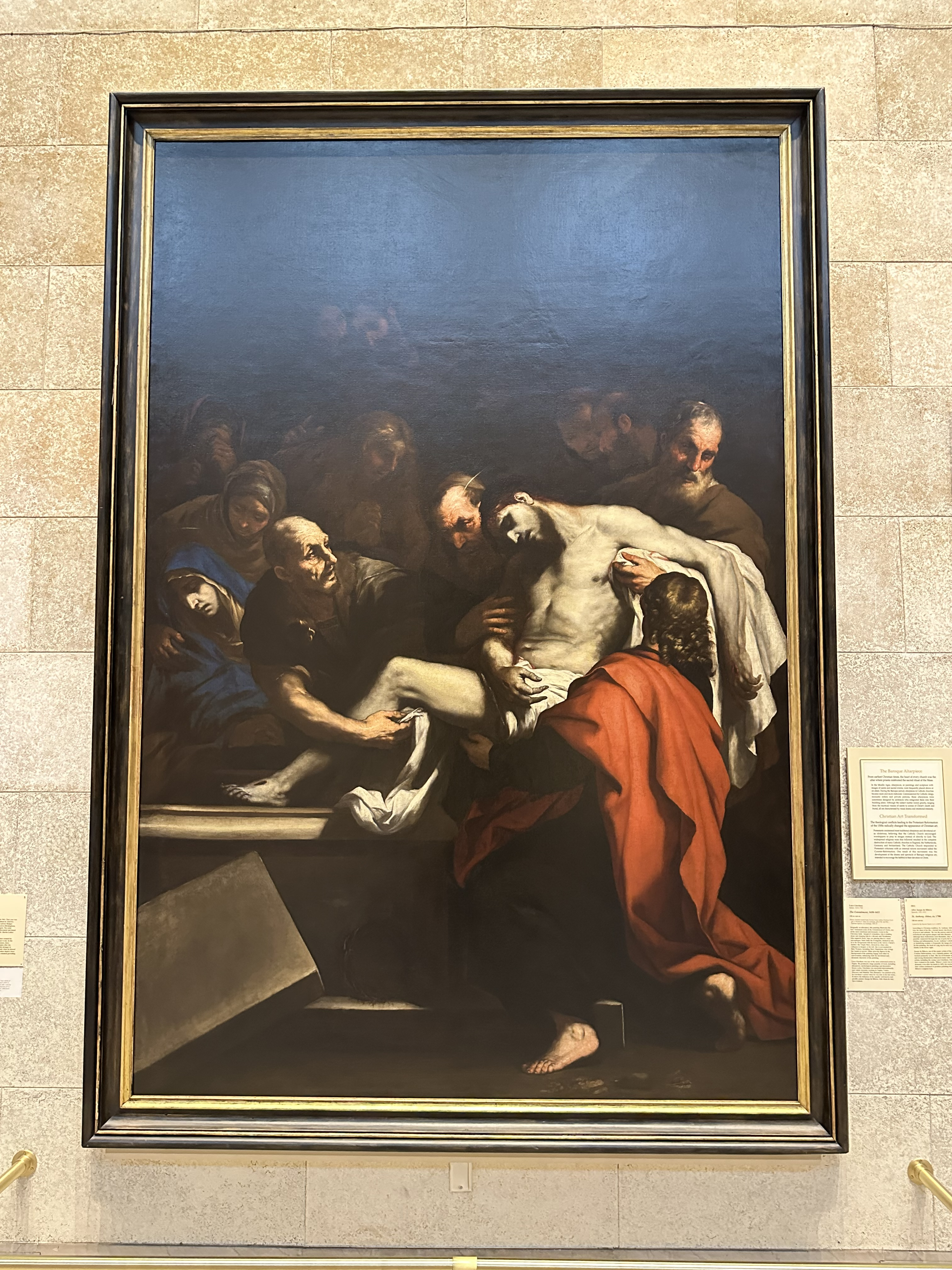
- The Entombment on display in 2023 at the Memorial Art Gallery
- Artist: Luca Giordano
- Year: 1650–1653
- Medium: Oil on canvas
- Dimensions: 292.7 cm × 201.9 cm (115.2 in × 79.5 in)
- Location: Memorial Art Gallery, Rochester, New York

“The Entombment” is a painting created by the Italian Baroque artist Luca Giordano around 1650–1653. Originally an altarpiece, the painting depicts a scene from the New Testament in which Jesus Christ is laid to rest in his tomb after his crucifixion. In the composition, Joseph of Arimathea supports Jesus’ body from behind, while Nicodemus carefully places Jesus’ legs into the stone sepulcher.

The painting includes John the Evangelist, who is clothed in red, and Mary, Jesus' mother, who is clothed in a warm blue. She is portrayed as deeply saddened by the death of her son and is being comforted by the Holy Women around her. There are additional grieving figures in the background.

The Entombment is an early work of the artist, who was in his late teens when he painted it.

== Artist ==
Giordano was one of the most renowned artists in Naples during the 17th century. Giordano's nickname was "Luca fa presto" (which translates as 'Luca the speedy') because he created his paintings at such a fast pace. Giordano's work draws deeply on his Catholic faith, and a pictorial working method defined by the theory of modes, a concept that profoundly shaped the poetry and aesthetic concepts of the Seicento period at the end of the Renaissance. These modes are the four canonical painting techniques are Sfumato, Unione, Chiaroscuro and Cangiante. Embracing naturalism as a cornerstone of his style, Giordano's works exuded a distinctive spiritual essence infused with his Catholic beliefs. The Entombment, a testament to his naturalistic technique, highlights the fusion of emotional intensity and skillful execution for which Giordano was highly revered.

== Influence ==
Luca Giordano, whose father Antonio was also a painter, is thought to have been first schooled by either the Spanish master Jusepe de Ribera or one of Ribera's followers. Giordano soon left Naples, possibly after Ribera's death in 1651, and travelled to Rome, Florence and Venice to further his studies. Caravaggio was a great influence on Ribera, and in turn on Luca Giordano, particularly his electrifying The Entombment. Giordano also studied the 16th-century Venetian masters, as he was captivated by the luminosity in their painting. He was inspired by their use of light, color, movement, and bravura. Several elements within the Detroit painting (see below) bear witness to the significant influence of Rubens' art on Giordano. These include the general luminous quality, the use of vivid colors—particularly reddish flesh-tones, deep reds, bluish-greens, and occasional yellow accents on the garments—as well as the seamless fluidity in the transitions between different tonalities.

== Related paintings ==
During the initial phase of his career, Giordano created multiple renditions of The Entombment. The Bari version is described as modest in quality and significantly affected by its poor state of preservation. Its historical significance was minimal until the discovery of the Detroit Entombment in 1972. Although the discovery of the Detroit Entombment demotes the Bari rendition to the status of a mere replica, the existence of this replica signifies the widespread admiration for this specific interpretation of a theme that held significance in the Seicento era, particularly in regions of Europe where Counter-Reformation religious beliefs endured. Giordano painted various different versions of this theme. The versions found in the Museo del Sannio at Benevento and the Philbrook Art Center in Tulsa belong to a slightly later period but still exhibit distinct naturalistic features. The previous paintings of The Entombment are not identifiable to the Detroit version.

== The Detroit Entombment ==
The Detroit Entombment demonstrates Giordano's skill in seamlessly incorporating and blending various stylistic approaches. The figures are arranged in a diagonal form with a very low viewpoint. Atiered marble pedestal represents the tomb they are placing Jesus into. These elements reflect the typical composition seen in Venetian paintings of the Seicento. The detailed naturalistic aspects in this painting accentuate the drama: the way Christ's body is positioned and how his head falls back into the shadows of the painting, the depiction of his tortured feet in the forefront, the apostle's hand grasping the cloth, and the unidealized portrayal of the man's face, accentuated with minimal light and shadow.

== See also ==
- List of works by Luca Giordano
