= The Fall of the Rebel Angels (Giordano) =

Painting by Luca Giordano

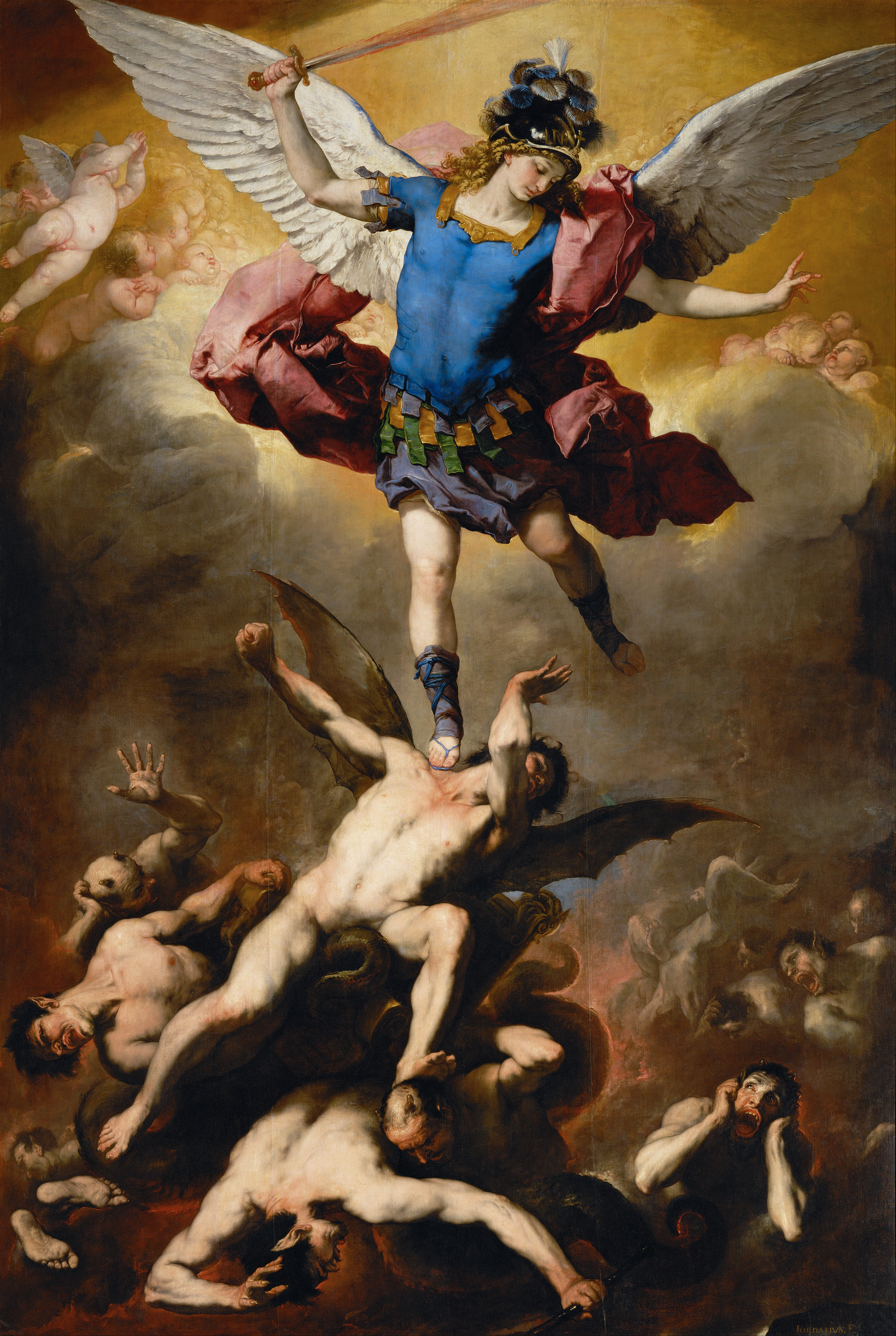
- Artist: Luca Giordano
- Year: c. 1666
- Medium: Oil on canvas
- Dimensions: 419 cm × 283 cm (165 in × 111 in)
- Location: Kunsthistorisches Museum; Vienna, Austria

The Fall of the Rebel Angels is an oil painting by the Italian late Baroque artist Luca Giordano, painted in c. 1666, and now exhibited at the Kunsthistorisches Museum, Vienna. Its dimensions are 419 × 283 cm.

== History and description ==
The work was most probably painted during the Venetian period of Giordano and the two strongest influences that the Neapolitan painter had during his life are evident in the canvas. The lower part of the painting, characterized by the presence of the demons defeated by the archangel Michael, is painted in a chiaroscuro style derived from Caravaggio and Ribera; while the upper part, characterized by the figure of the saint, shows evident influences of Venetian painting.

The image of Saint Michael mirrors that of classical iconography, showing its spread wings, with a sword, with a heavenly dress and a red cape; intent on expelling the demons that came from the underworld on the earth. The only differences with an earlier painting on the same subject, made by Giordano a few years prior (1663) and now kept in the Gemäldegalerie of Berlin, is that in this work of Vienna's saint is portrayed holding a sword instead of a lance and that his head is uncovered without helmet.

== See also ==
- List of works by Luca Giordano

== Bibliography ==
- Luca Giordano, 1634-1705, Editrice Electa (2001) ISBN 88-435-8579-7
