= Luca Giordano =

Italian Baroque painter (1634–1705)

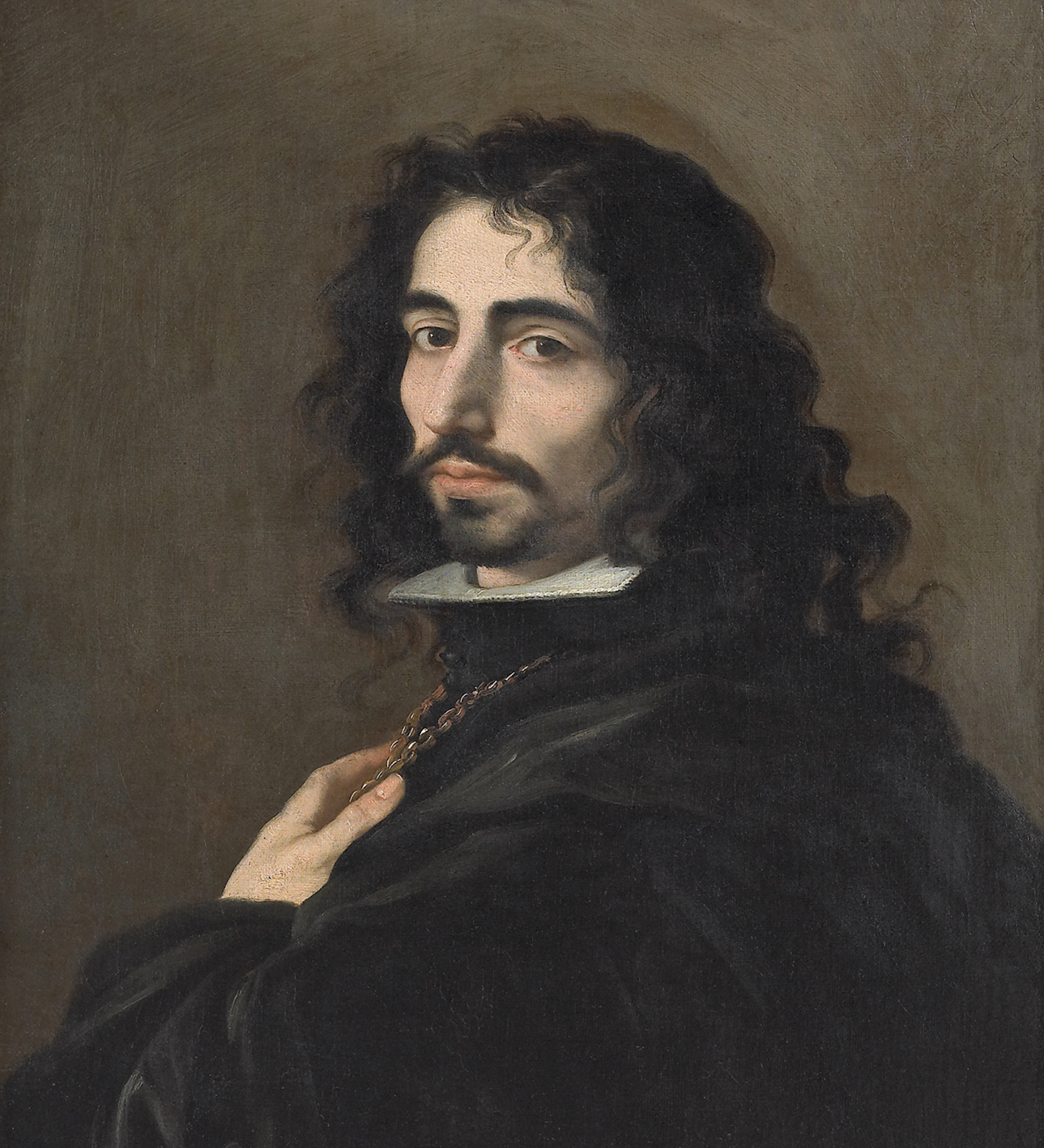
- Self-portrait, c. 1670, Uffizi, Florence
- Born: 18 October 1634; Naples, Kingdom of Naples
- Died: 3 January 1705 (aged 70); Naples, Kingdom of Naples
- Other name: Luca fa presto
- Education: Jusepe de Ribera
- Known for: Painting
- Notable work: The Entombment (1650–1653); Lucretia and Tarquin (1663); Saint Michael (c. 1663); The Fall of the Rebel Angels (c. 1666); Marriage of the Virgin (c. 1688)
- Movement: Baroque
- Spouse: Margherita Dardi (m. 1658)

Signature
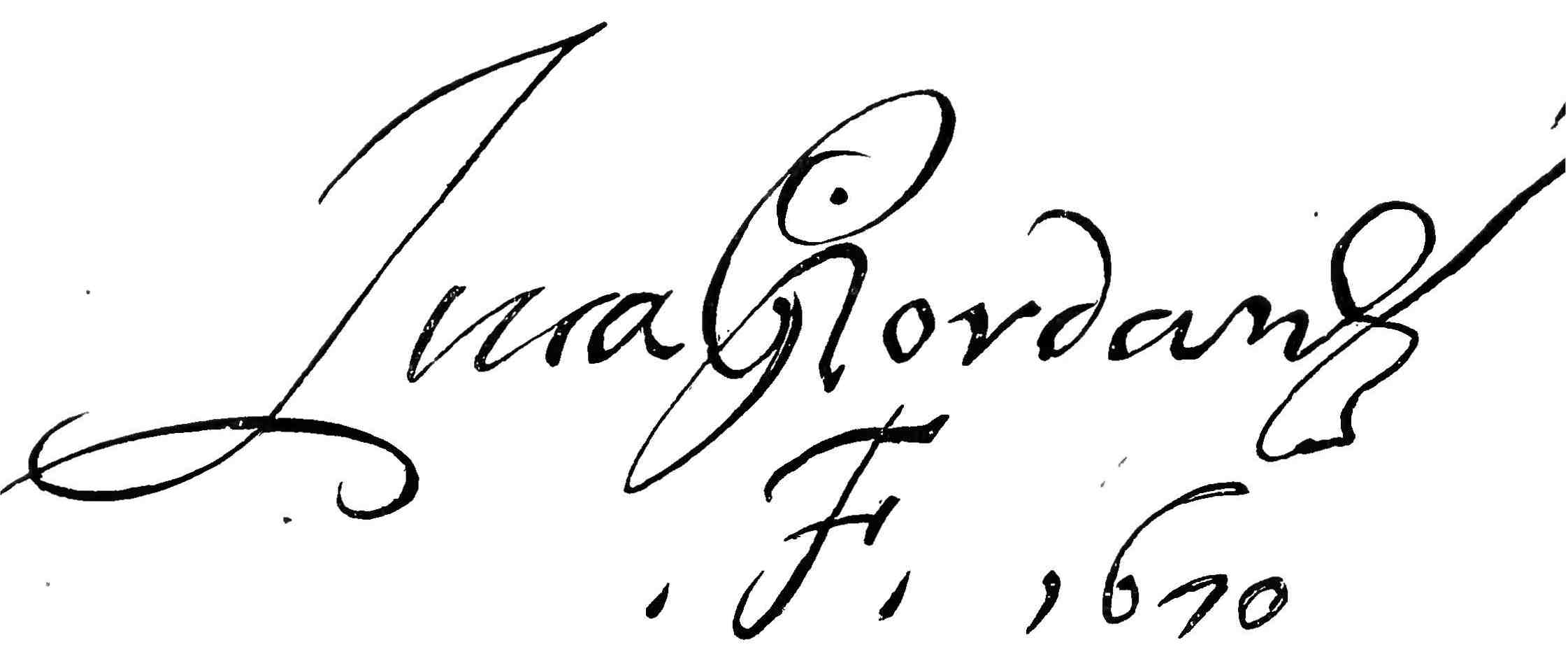

Luca Giordano (18 October 1634 – 3 January 1705) was an Italian late-Baroque painter and printmaker in etching. Giordano was one of the most celebrated artists of the Neapolitan Baroque, whose vast output included altarpieces, mythological paintings and many decorative fresco cycles in both palaces and churches. He moved away from the dark manner of early 17th-century Neapolitan art as practised by Caravaggio and his followers and Jusepe de Ribera, and, drawing on the ideas of many other artists, above all the 16th-century Venetians and Pietro da Cortona, he introduced a new sense of light and glowing colour, of movement and dramatic action. He was internationally successful and travelled widely, working in Naples, Rome, Florence, and Venice, before spending a decade in Spain.

== Early life and training ==
Born in Naples, Giordano was the son of the painter Antonio Giordano. In around 1650 he was apprenticed to Ribera on the recommendation of the viceroy of Naples and his early work was heavily influenced by his teacher. Like Ribera, he painted many half-length figures of philosophers, either imaginary portraits of specific figures, or generic types. The St. Luke Painting the Virgin (Museo de Arte de Ponce), perhaps Giordano's first major work, in which the saint is a self-portrait, is reminiscent of Ribera's art from c. 1637.

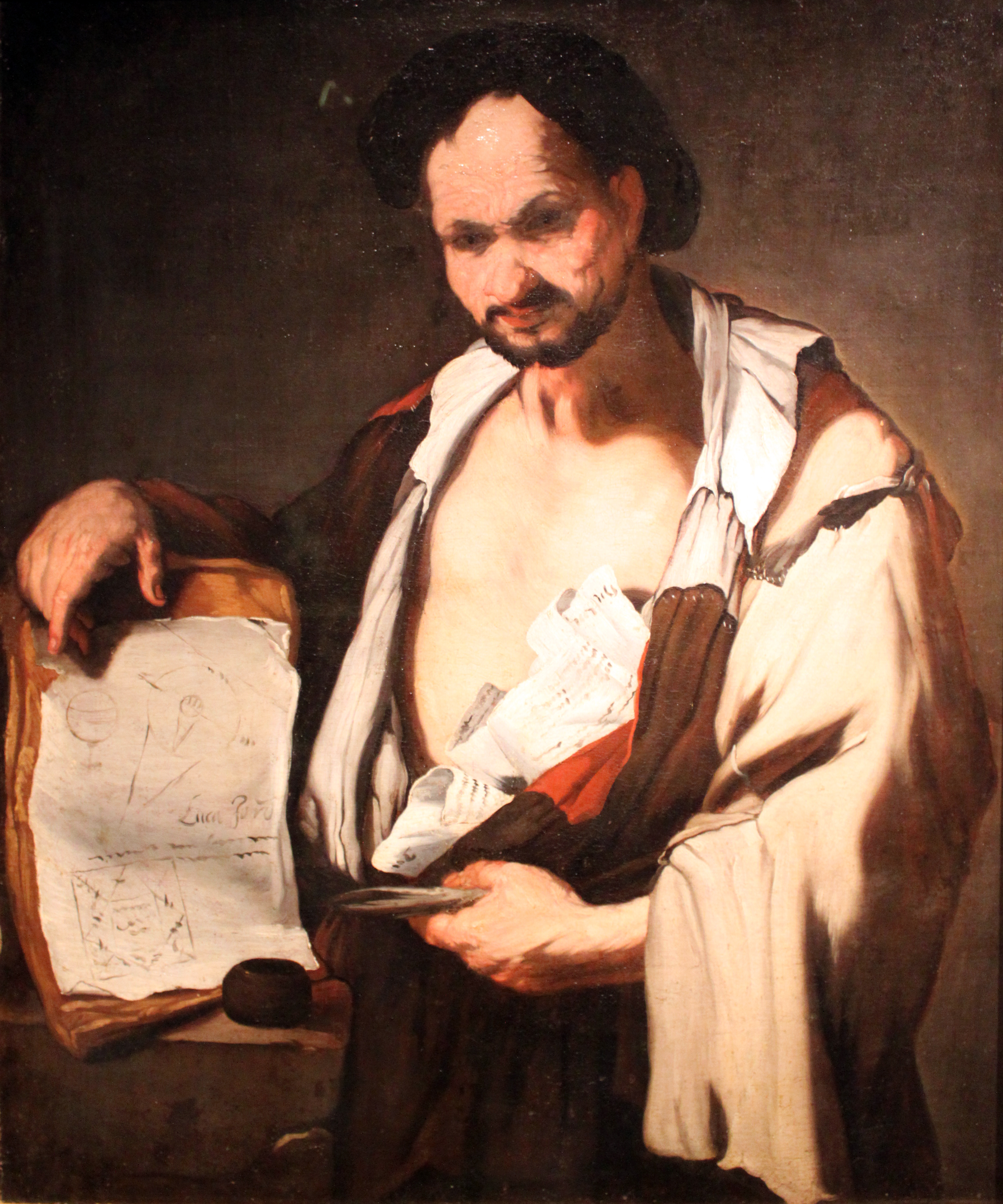
Democritus, 1690, Hamburger Kunsthalle

Giordano was also attracted by Ribera's half-length paintings of philosophers, and himself painted many images of philosophers; the Crates (1660; Rome, Palazzo Barberini) is an impressive example of these dramatic and powerfully naturalistic works. The careful study of physiognomy and expression suggests that Giordano may also have been aware of the treatise De humana physiognomonia (1586) by the Neapolitan scholar Giambattista della Porta.

Giordano acquired the nickname Luca fa presto, which translates into "Luca paints quickly." His speed, in design as well as handiwork, and his versatility, which enabled him to imitate other painters deceptively, earned for him two other epithets, "The Thunderbolt" (Fulmine) and "The Proteus" of painting. He became also noted for his lively and showy use of colour.

About 1652 Giordano made his first journey to Rome. In Rome he absorbed the Baroque art of Pietro da Cortona, whom he may have met, and made many studies (in red chalk on red prepared paper) dall’Antico and after the works of Roman High Renaissance artists. In 1653 Giordano returned to Naples; in the late 1650s, drawing on his ceaseless experiments with other styles, he created an exuberantly Baroque style that brought new light and colour to Neapolitan painting. His Virgin of the Rosary (1657; Naples, Museo di Capodimonte) for the church of the Solitaria, Naples, is almost a homage to Mattia Preti, whom he admired both for his tragic grandeur and for his boldness and freedom. Yet the warmth of the faces also suggests the influence of Rubens, whose art he may have admired in the Chiesa Nuova in Rome and studied in private collections in Naples.

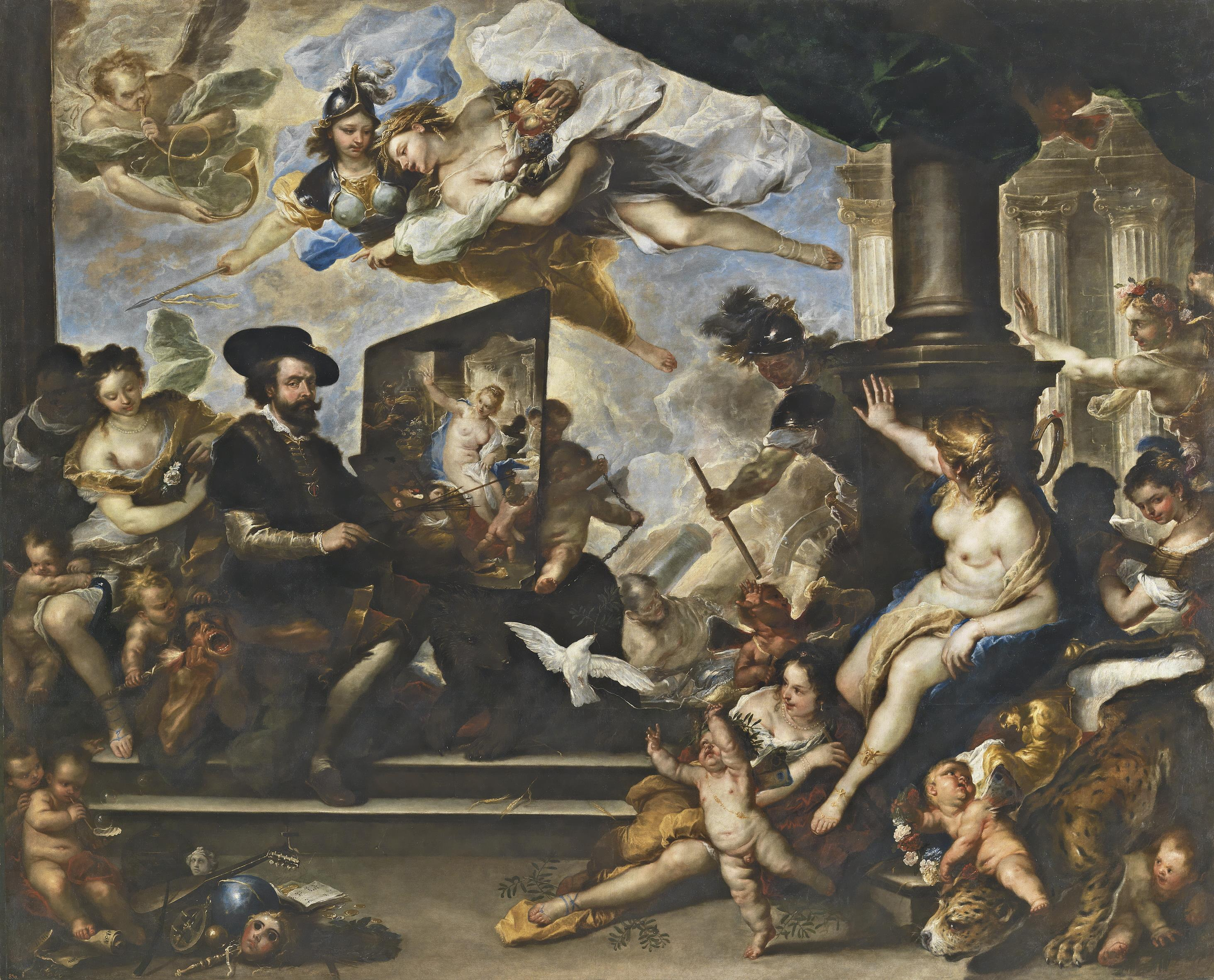
Rubens Painting an Allegory of Peace, c. 1660, Madrid, Museo del Prado

Rubens had a lasting influence on the work of Giordano, who expressed his admiration for the Flemish artist in his Rubens Painting an Allegory of Peace (Madrid, Museo del Prado). In 1658, the year of his marriage to Margherita Dardi, Giordano painted two impressive and celebrated altarpieces for Santa Maria della Verità, Naples, both of which glow with warm Venetian colour and light: St. Thomas of Villanova Distributing Alms and the Ecstasy of St. Nicholas of Tolentino. In a group of more restrained works, painted before 1660 and including the Calling of St. Matthew and the Calling of St. Peter (both Naples, Certosa di San Martino), the Feast of Herod and the Marriage at Cana (both Naples, Museo di Capodimonte), the influence of Paolo Veronese’s rich banquet scenes predominates, although Giordano may also have been interested in similar themes by Preti, such as his Feast of Herod (Toledo Museum of Art).

The lighter palette of two works from 1664, the Virgin with St. Joachim and St. Anna and the Rest on the Flight into Egypt (both Naples, Santa Teresa a Chiaia), suggests that Giordano had also studied works by Nicolas Poussin in Neapolitan private collections; the more tender sentiment draws close to the style of Guido Reni.

== The mature years ==
In 1665, the year in which Giordano joined the Neapolitan painters’ confraternity, he travelled to Florence and afterwards to Venice. It may have been on this visit that he won the commission for altarpieces for the Venetian church of Santa Maria della Salute. In the period between 1665 and 1676 he gradually transformed his long study of the art of Pietro da Cortona into a highly personal idiom in which various other influences are evident. The Assumption of the Virgin (1667; Venice, Santa Maria della Salute) clearly reflects Titian (as does the Annunciation, 1672; New York, Metropolitan Museum of Art), while the Birth of the Virgin and the Presentation in the Temple (before 1674 according to Boschini; both Venice, Santa Maria della Salute) unite Venetian sources with the art of the Roman Baroque. In the Virgin of the Rosary (1672; Crispano, San Gregorio Magno) Giordano experimented with the style of Cortona, as he did yet more freely in his many easel paintings of mythological subjects, such as the celebrated Galatea (before 1677; Florence, Palazzo Pitti).

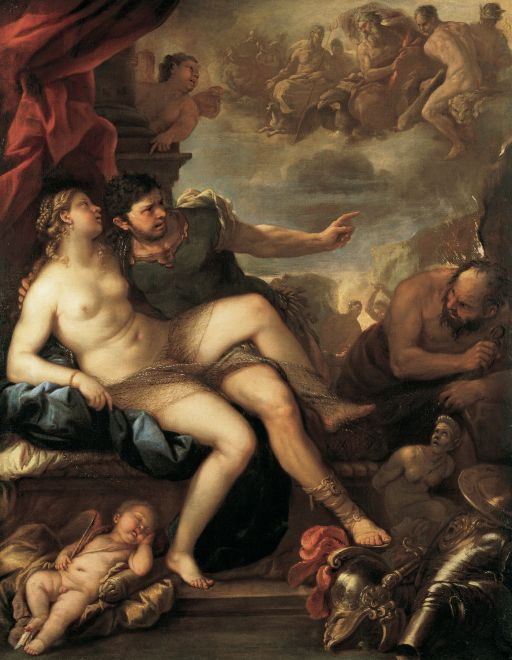
Venus and Mars, c. 1670s, Academy of Fine Arts Vienna

Yet Giordano's style remained varied, and he continued to produce pictures in the style of Ribera, such as the St. Sebastian Cured by St. Irene (Philadelphia Museum of Art) and the Assumption of the Virgin (New York, Hispanic Society of America). Giordano's imitation of Ribera's style reveals his sensitivity to the tastes of his Neapolitan patrons. In the late 1670s Giordano began a series of great fresco cycles. In 1677 he was commissioned to paint large frescoes divided by a heavy late Mannerist framework on the nave vault of the Benedictine abbey of Monte Cassino (destroyed during the World War II).

His severely classical scenes of the Life of St. Benedict (1677–8) are treated as quadri riportati and are reminiscent of the style of Domenichino. There followed the St. Bridget in Glory (1678) in the Neapolitan church of Santa Brigida, inspired by Giovanni Lanfranco’s fresco in the Royal Chapel of the Treasure of St. Januarius in Naples Cathedral; the daringly foreshortened figures in Giordano's pendentives were intended to give a sense of depth to the very low dome. The cycle of the Life of St. Gregorio Armeno (c. 1678–9), in the Neapolitan church of the same name, moves away from the austere style of Monte Cassino, and the scenes are linked by a free compositional rhythm. The narratives fall between devotional history and legend and are deeply influenced by Cortona, both in their narrative style and in the light touch and transparent colour.

== Florence, 1682–1686 ==
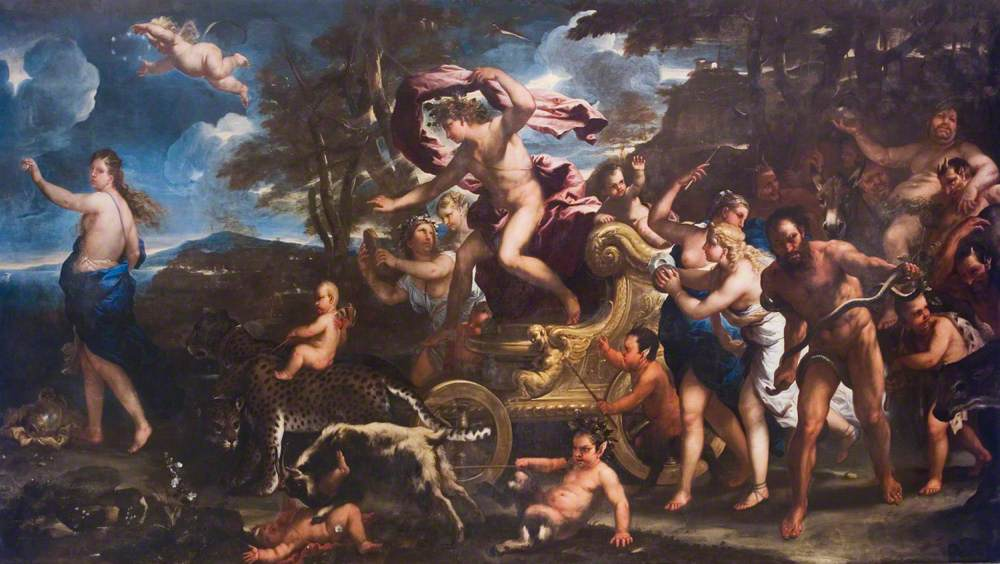
Bacchus and Ariadne (c. 1674–1677), Herbert Art Gallery and Museum, Coventry

Even after Giordano returned to Naples, he frequently worked for clients in Florence, where his art was popular with such collectors as Andrea, Ottavio and Lorenzo del Rosso, the Sanminiati family and Pietro Andrea Andreini. Andreini visited Naples (c. 1678) and brought back to Florence a small group of works by Giordano, among them the Apollo and Marsyas (Florence, Museo Bardini), which spread his fame in the city. Early in 1682 Giordano himself arrived in Florence, having visited Rome, where he doubtless admired Giovanni Battista Gaulli's fresco in the dome and vaults of the Church of the Gesù. He stayed with the del Rosso family, who commissioned many works.

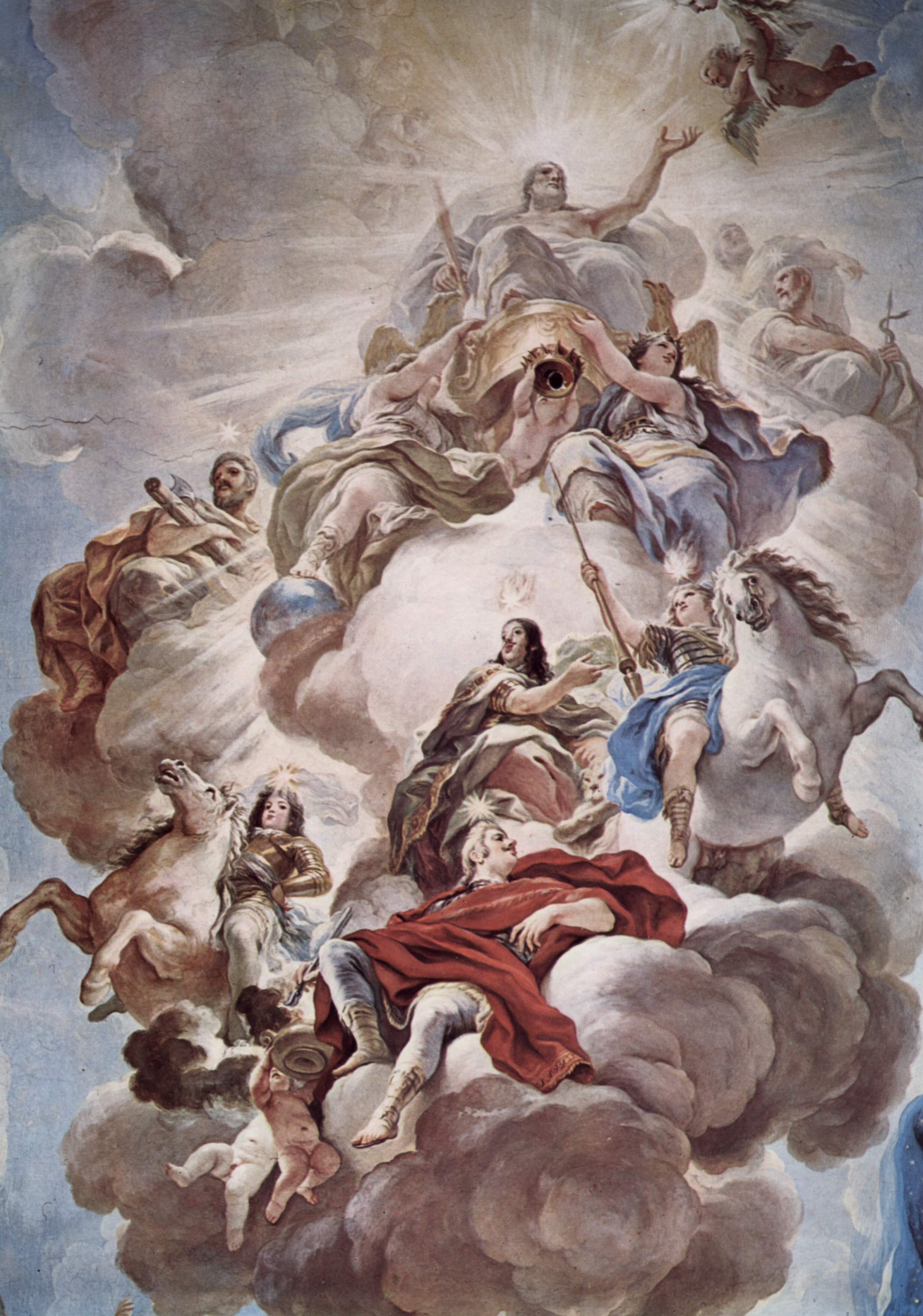
Triumph of the Medici in the clouds of Mount Olympus, 1684–1686, fresco in the Palazzo Medici Riccardi, Florence

In 1682–1683 Giordano painted various fresco series in Florence, including one in the dome of the Corsini Chapel of Santa Maria del Carmine, Florence. In this work he was again inspired by Lanfranco yet also responded to the recent work of Giovanni Battista Benaschi in Santi Apostoli, Naples, while the handling of the paint suggests Jacopo Bassano. The three oil sketches that Giordano prepared for this dome were retained by the patron (two Florence, Galleria Corsini).

In the same period Giordano won the commission from Marchese Francesco Riccardi (1648–1719) to decorate the library and the ceiling of the Biblioteca Riccardiana (Allegory of Divine Wisdom) and the long gallery of the Palazzo Medici Riccardi. The vast frescoes of the latter are contained in the 1670s gallery addition, overlooking the gardens. The planning was overseen by Alessandro Segni and commissioned by Francesco Riccardi. They include the prototypic hagiographic celebration of the Medici family in the center, surrounded by a series of interlocking narratives: allegorical figures (the Cardinal Virtues, the Elements of Nature) and mythological episodes (Neptune and Amphitrita, The Rape of Proserpine, The Triumphal procession of Bacchus, The Death of Adonis, Ceres and Triptolemus).

Giordano also worked directly for the Medici while in Florence, painting for Cosimo III a Triumph of Bacchus (c. 1665) and an Allegory of Peace between Florence and Fiesole (c. 1682; Florence, Palazzo Pitti); the latter work reveals the developments in the organization of style and landscape elements made in the Medici Riccardi frescoes. Thus Giordano oscillated between two styles in Florence, a powerful Baroque in his religious art and a more elegant classicism in his secular decorations.

== Back in Naples, 1686–1692 ==
Giordano returned to Naples in 1686, and his religious works of the middle 1680s, such as the Destiny of the Virgin (1685; Rome, Santa Maria in Campitelli) and the Virgin of the Rosary (1686; Naples, Museo di Capodimonte), betray the influence of both Cortona and Bernini in their illusionism, theatrical lighting effects, figure types and drapery style.

== Court painter in Spain, 1692–1702 ==
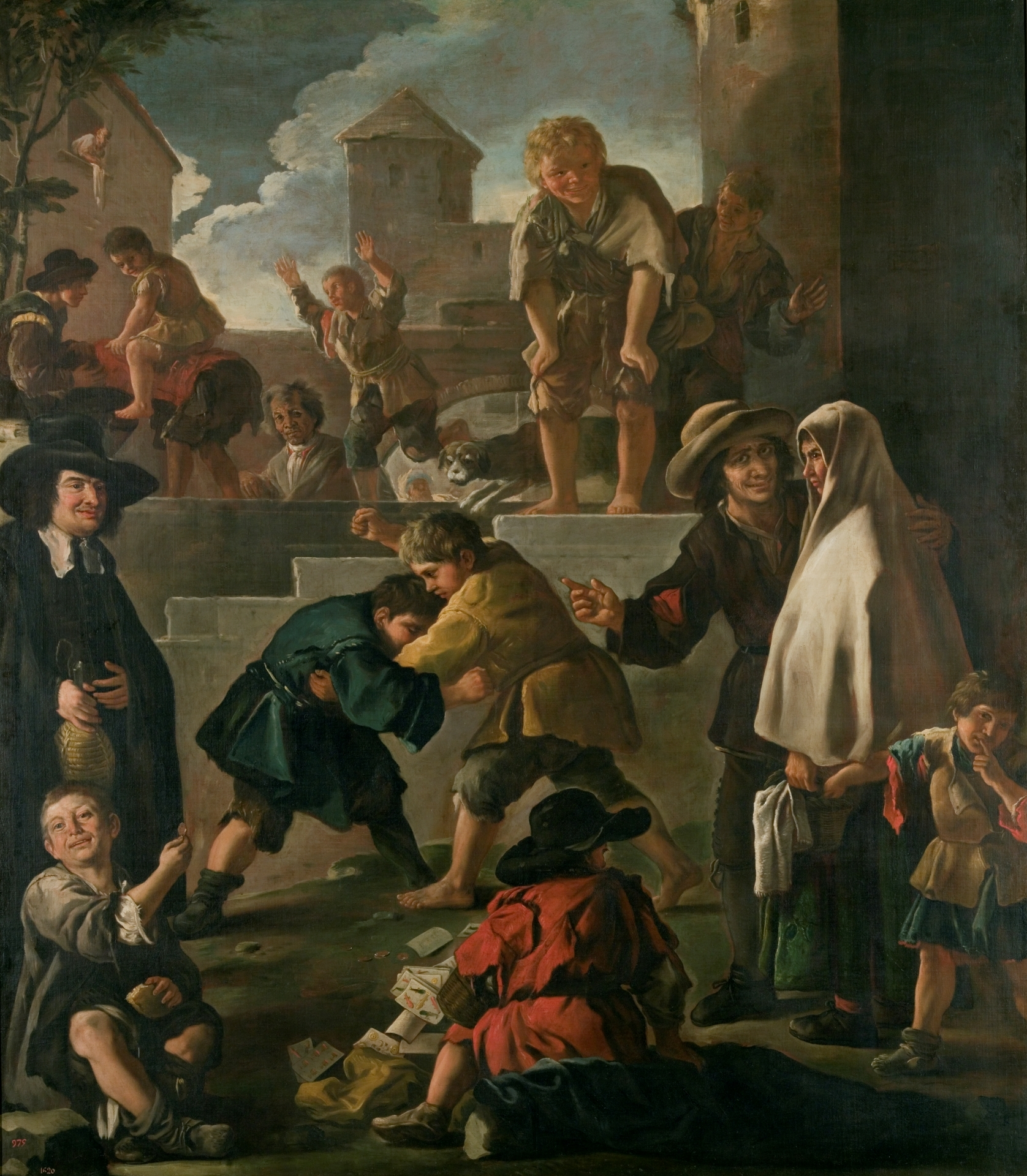
Boys fighting, c. 1694–1695, Museo del Prado

In 1692 Giordano went to Spain at the invitation of Charles II. He stayed there for ten years, returning to Naples in 1702, following Charles' death. While in Spain, he painted major decorative schemes at the Buen Retiro Palace, El Escorial, the sacristry of Toledo Cathedral and the Royal Palace of Aranjuez.

His first Spanish work was the decoration (1692–4) of the vault of the imperial staircase at the Escorial with St. Lawrence in Glory, Adored by Charles V and Philip II. Deeply affected by the Roman Baroque of Gaulli and Bernini, Giordano created a sense of infinite space, flooded with golden light and filled with tumultuous figures. The scene is observed by the reigning royal family seen from behind a balustrade below; these acutely observed portraits suggest Giordano's response to Diego Velázquez. To set off his fresco from the austere 16th-century architecture, Giordano also painted a continuous frieze showing the Battle of St. Quentin, which served as a transitional zone between the vault and the wall frescoes by Luca Cambiaso.

In the same years Giordano frescoed the vaults of the side aisles and the main vault of the monastery church at the Escorial; a new sense of airy space is conveyed by the lightly sketched figures in the distance, while larger, more monumental figures are concentrated around the edges of the composition. In 1696 Giordano painted a series of scenes from the Life of the Virgin for the Monastery of Saint Mary of Guadalupe, which were rapidly executed and show Giordano drawing close to the lyrical art of Murillo.

The Allegory of the Golden Fleece, a c. 1694 fresco on the ceiling of the Casón del Buen Retiro is one of the possible reasons given for the building having survived when most of the other Buen Retiro palace complex buildings were demolished in the nineteenth century, now it's an annex of the Prado Museum Complex that holds a library for researchers. the decoration of the ceiling of the There followed the decoration of the ceiling of the sacristy of Toledo Cathedral (begun early 1698), in which Giordano darkened his palette and returned to the more three-dimensional style of the Roman Baroque, suggesting, in his use of feigned architecture, an awareness of Andrea Pozzo’s illusionistic decoration of Sant'Ignazio, Rome. Nonetheless, his increasingly refined decorative motifs continue to anticipate later developments. He also painted part of the frescoes at the Church of Saint Anthony of the Germans and many pictures for the court, private patrons and churches. His pupils, Aniello Rossi and Matteo Pacelli, assisted him in Spain.

Giordano was popular at the Spanish court, and the king granted him the title of "caballero". His works can be seen all around Madrid, and the Museo del Prado houses a large compilation of his works. Not far from there, the Real Academia de Bellas Artes de San Fernando owns several of his works and in the neighboring Thyssen-Bornemisza Museum there is a Judging of Salomon long-term loan, belonging to Baroness Carmen Thyssen Private Collection. After the death of Charles II in 1700, Giordano worked only for private patrons, although Philip V greatly admired his art. On 8 February 1702 he left Madrid and returned to Naples

== Late work in Naples, 1702–1705 ==
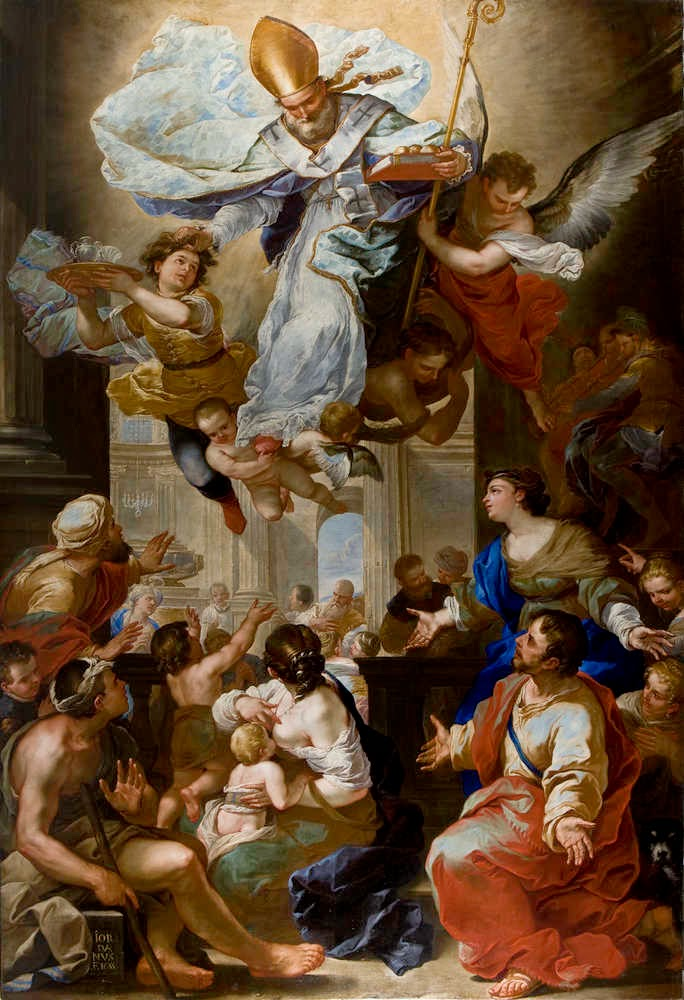
Miracle of St. Nicholas, Church of Santa Brigida, Naples

After his return to Naples, Giordano continued to paint prolifically. Executed in a lighter, less rhetorical style, these late works, prefiguring Rococo, proved influential throughout the eighteenth century, and were admired by Fragonard.

He spent large sums in acts of munificence, and was particularly liberal to poorer artists. One of his maxims was that the good painter is the one whom the public like, and that the public are attracted more by colour than by design.

Giordano had an astonishing facility, which often lead to an impression of superficiality of his works. He left many works in Rome, and far more in Naples. Of the latter, his Christ expelling the Traders from the Temple in the church of the Padri Girolamini, a colossal work, full of expressive "lazzaroni" or beggars from Naples; also the frescoes of the Triumph of Judith at San Martino, and those in the Tesoro della Certosa, including the subject of Moses and the Brazen Serpent. Other notable examples are the Judgment of Paris formerly in the Gemäldegalerie, Berlin, but destroyed in World War II, and Christ with the Doctors in the Temple, in the Palazzo Corsini, Rome. In later years, he painted influential frescoes for the Cappella Corsini, the Palazzo Medici Riccardi and other works.

Giordano's final works, left incomplete on his death, include the darkly shadowed, visionary pictures, the Marriage at Cana and the Multiplication of the Loaves and Fishes (Naples, Santa Maria Donnaregina Nuova), and the frescoes in the sacristy of the church of Santa Brigida, all of which were completed by Giordano's pupil Giuseppe Simonelli. The fresco in Santa Brigida had been planned prior to the Spanish period but begun only after Giordano's return to Naples. Giordano executed little himself, but nonetheless the fresco has an intensity and passion that look forward to Goya. Giordano died in Naples in 1705. Sources differ as to whether he died on 3 January or 12 January 1705. He was buried in the Church of Santa Brigida.

== Working methods and technique ==
The most striking aspect of Giordano's technique was his legendary speed of execution; in his many brilliantly coloured frescoes his touch is rapid and fluent. His speed and capacity to improvise reached a climax in his Spanish period; the Prior of the Escorial wrote to Charles II:

Today your Giordano has painted ten, eleven, twelve figures three times life size, plus the Powers, Dominions, Angels, Seraphim and Cherubim that go with them and all the clouds that support them. The two theologians he has at his side to instruct him in the mysteries are less ready with their answers than he is with his questions, for their tongues are too slow for the speed of his brush.

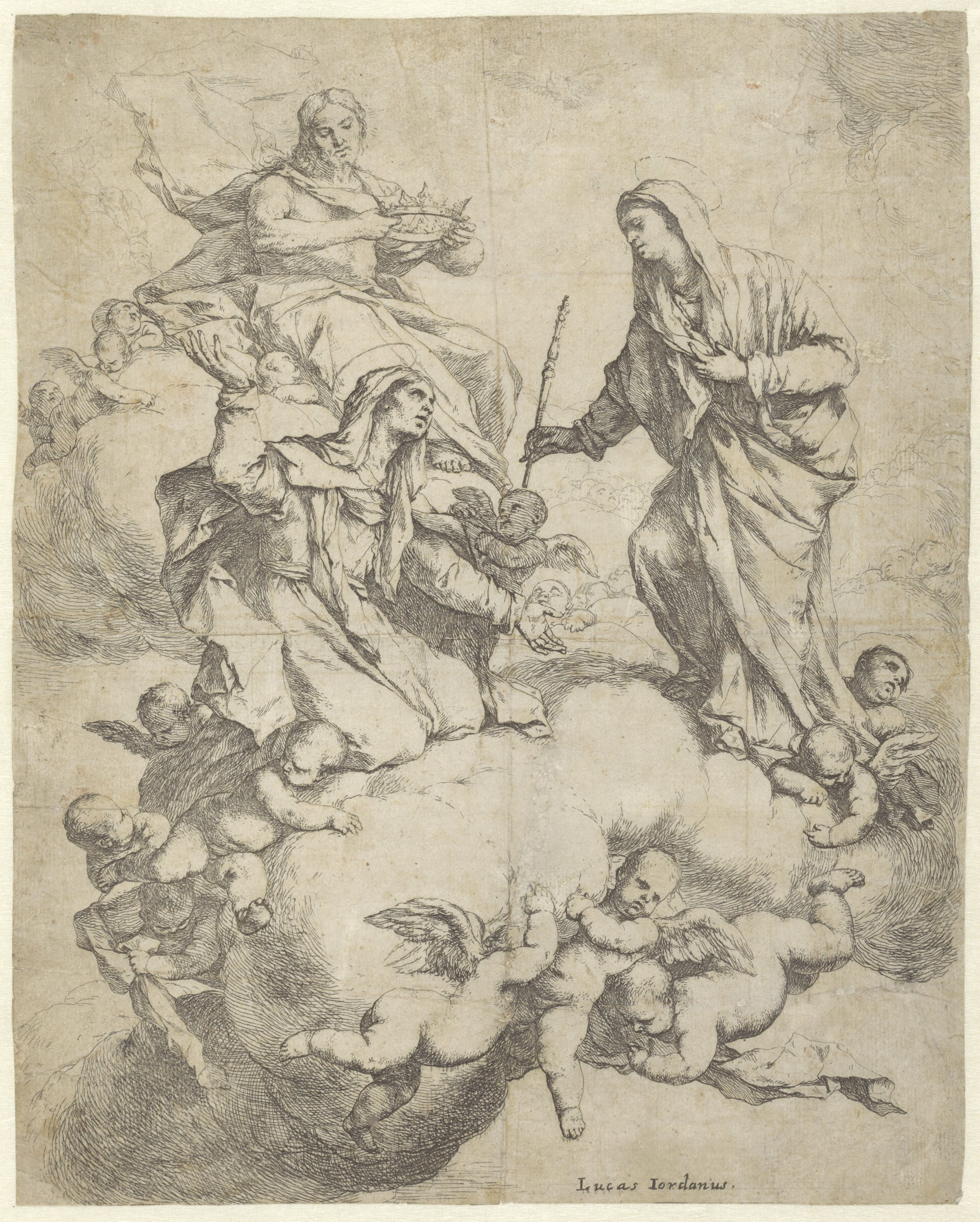
Christ holding a crown and the Virgin receiving St. Anne in Heaven, Rijksmuseum, Amsterdam

To facilitate his gift for improvisation, Giordano is said to have brought half-nude models with him on to the scaffold. Giordano prepared his works in drawings and oil sketches and was a prolific draughtsman. His early compositional studies, such as the three drawings of St. Sebastian Succoured by the Holy Women (Florence, Uffizi; Vienna, Albertina), are influenced by Ribera's drawings, yet Ribera's compact forms are replaced by Giordano's more tremulous line.

In the early years Giordano also copied the works of other artists, using red chalk on red prepared paper, again in the style of Ribera; these drawings include the St. Mark (priv. col.) after Domenichino's pendentive in Sant'Andrea della Valle, Rome, and the Standing Man Seen from the Rear (London, British Museum), which is copied from a scene by Polidoro da Caravaggio. In the middle years Giordano's drawings became more dramatic and freely handled, enlivened by vigorous wash, while the more abundant late drawings are mainly in black chalk and grey wash and concentrate on simplified forms, as in the compositional study, A Miracle of St. Anthony of Padua (Ann Arbor, University of Michigan Museum of Art).

Giordano made numerous small oil sketches in connection with his fresco cycles. Four such sketches (New York, priv. col.; Dunkirk, Musée des Beaux-Arts; Rome, priv. col.; Strasbourg, Musée des Beaux-Arts) for the frescoes in San Gregorio Armeno demonstrate the various stages in his creative thought. One of the oil sketches (New York) corresponds closely to the finished work, while the others show Giordano working out the composition and colour. The oil sketch of the Three Fates (Manchester Art Gallery) for the central vault of the gallery of the Palazzo Medici Riccardi dates to 1682, while a dozen others associated with the decoration of the library and gallery are documented to 1685 (ten, London, Mahon priv. col.; one, London, Sir Emmanuel Kaye priv. col.; and another, Beverly Hills, Frederick W. Field priv. col.). It is not clear how Giordano used such sketches, and their status remains controversial; some scholars believe them to be ricordi, while others consider them modelli.

== Influence ==
Giordano was one of the most acclaimed Italian painters of the latter part of the 17th century. At the peak of his career, he controlled a large workshop; Bernardo de' Dominici stated that he had around 30 skilled assistants, all working in close association with him. His best pupils in painting were Giuseppe Simonelli, Nicola Malinconico and Paolo de Matteis. However, his influence, like his travels and career, were broad and prolific. For example, he is said to have influenced in Venice, Sebastiano Ricci, Giovan Battista Langetti, Giovanni Coli, and Filippo Gherardi. Other pupils included Juan Antonio Boujas, Nunzio Ferraiuoli (Nunzio degli Afflitti), Giovanni Battista Lama, Andrea Miglionico, Pedro de Calabria, Matteo Pacelli, Francisco Tramulles, Nicola Maria Rossi, and Aniello Rossi.

As a young man, Giordano engraved works with considerable skill, including some of his own paintings, such as the Slaughter of the Priests of Baal. He also painted much on the crystal borderings of looking-glasses, cabinets and others seen in many Italian palaces, and was, in this form of art, the master of Carlo Garofalo.

== Critical reputation ==
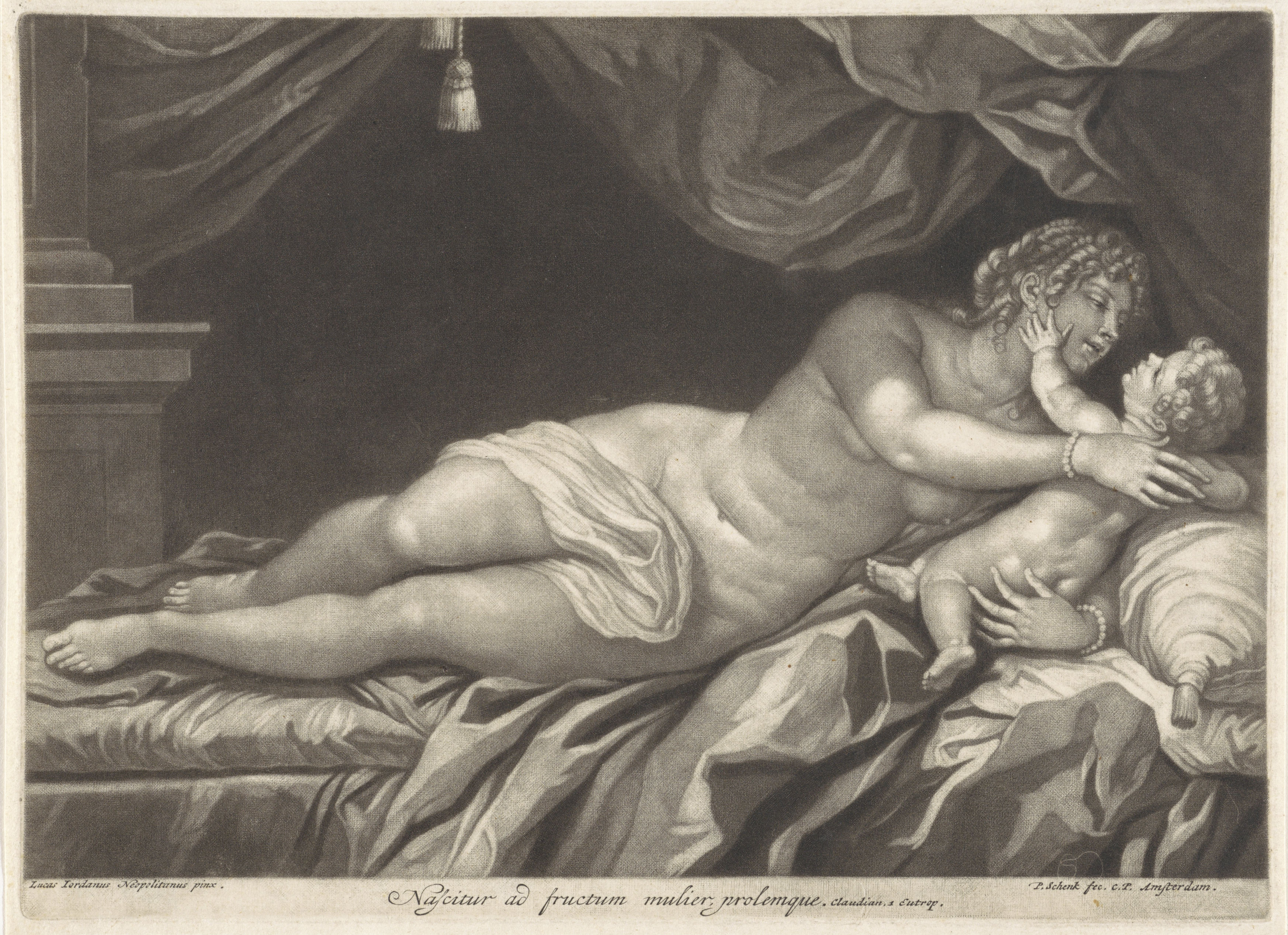
Venus and Cupid, engraving by Peter Schenk the Elder after Luca Giordano, Rijksmuseum, Amsterdam

Although Giordano's art was not universally understood and appreciated in his lifetime, his fame was nonetheless enormous. His first great supporter was the merchant and collector Gaspar Roomer, part of whose collection was inherited by Ferdinand van den Eynde (the remainder was sold by Giordano himself). Other patrons, besides Cosimo III de’ Medici and Charles II, were the Schönborn family of Pommersfelden and Johann Wilhelm, Elector Palatine. On Giordano's death, his son inherited the huge sum of 300,000 ducats.

Giordano's many pupils failed to rival his achievement, and during his lifetime his influence was initially more important in Venice than in Naples or Rome. The classical painter Francesco di Maria bitterly opposed his style, which he referred to as ‘heretical’, and in 1664 a letter from Giacomo di Castro to the collector Antonio Ruffo described Giordano as a virtuoso imitator of the styles of other artists. This view, which failed to appreciate his creativity, became a critical cliché. In the middle years of the 18th century it was resisted only by Francesco Solimena, who was more of a friend than a pupil and who absorbed from Giordano the concept of a rich and varied relationship with tradition.

In Rome, as is clear from the Relatione della vita di Luca Giordano pittore celebre (1681; Florence, National Central Library, Cod. II–II–110, cc. 88–9), which some consider to have been written by Giordano himself, his paintings were little appreciated, perhaps because of their fundamental difference from the Roman Baroque.

In the late years of the 17th century and the early years of the 18th, Giordano's Neapolitan reputation fluctuated. In the 1690s Paolo de Matteis was deeply influenced by him, although his style is more elegant and graceful. Even in the 18th century, when de Matteis had adopted a more classical style, his decorative works were still influenced by Giordano's frescoes (1704) in the Cappella del Tesoro of the Certosa di San Martino, Naples; Giordano's art also formed the starting-point for the graceful style of Corrado Giaquinto. In the early 18th century the dominant tone was set by Solimena's classicizing art, and Giordano was less appreciated; this transition can be pinpointed to the biography written by de' Dominici and published in the Vite of 1742–5, where the tone is much less enthusiastic than in the first biography he wrote, which was published with the second edition (1728) of Bellori’s Lives of the Artists.

It was in Venice, as recorded by Marco Boschini, that the fame of Giordano spread most rapidly. Venetian artists were attracted by the warmth and colour that Giordano absorbed from Rubens, by his Baroque sense of space and by the contrasts of light and dark inspired by Ribera. His art heralded the Rococo, and this aspect was developed by Sebastiano Ricci, who shared his passion for Paolo Veronese.

In the 18th century his reputation stood high, though it was foreigners who most appreciated his work. In 1756 Charles-Nicolas Cochin admired Giordano as the precursor of the Rococo, and Jean-Honoré Fragonard engraved some of his works as illustrations to the Voyage pittoresque (1781–86) of Jean-Claude Richard. However, with the advent of Neoclassicism, the fortunes of Giordano declined, to rise again in the early 20th century, against the background of renewed interest in the 17th and 18th centuries. The contributions of many scholars (Longhi; Bologna; Arslan) culminated in the impressive monograph by Oreste Ferrari and Giuseppe Scavizzi in 1966, of which a revised and expanded edition was published in 1992.

Michael Levey remarks of him "Giordano was the ideal rococo painter, speedy, prolific, dazzling in colour, assured in draughtsmanship, ever-talented and never touching the fringe of genius." He has been viewed as a proto-Tiepolo, reanimating that grand manner of Cortona in a style that would brighten with Tiepolo.

== Gallery ==
See also Category:Paintings by Luca Giordano.

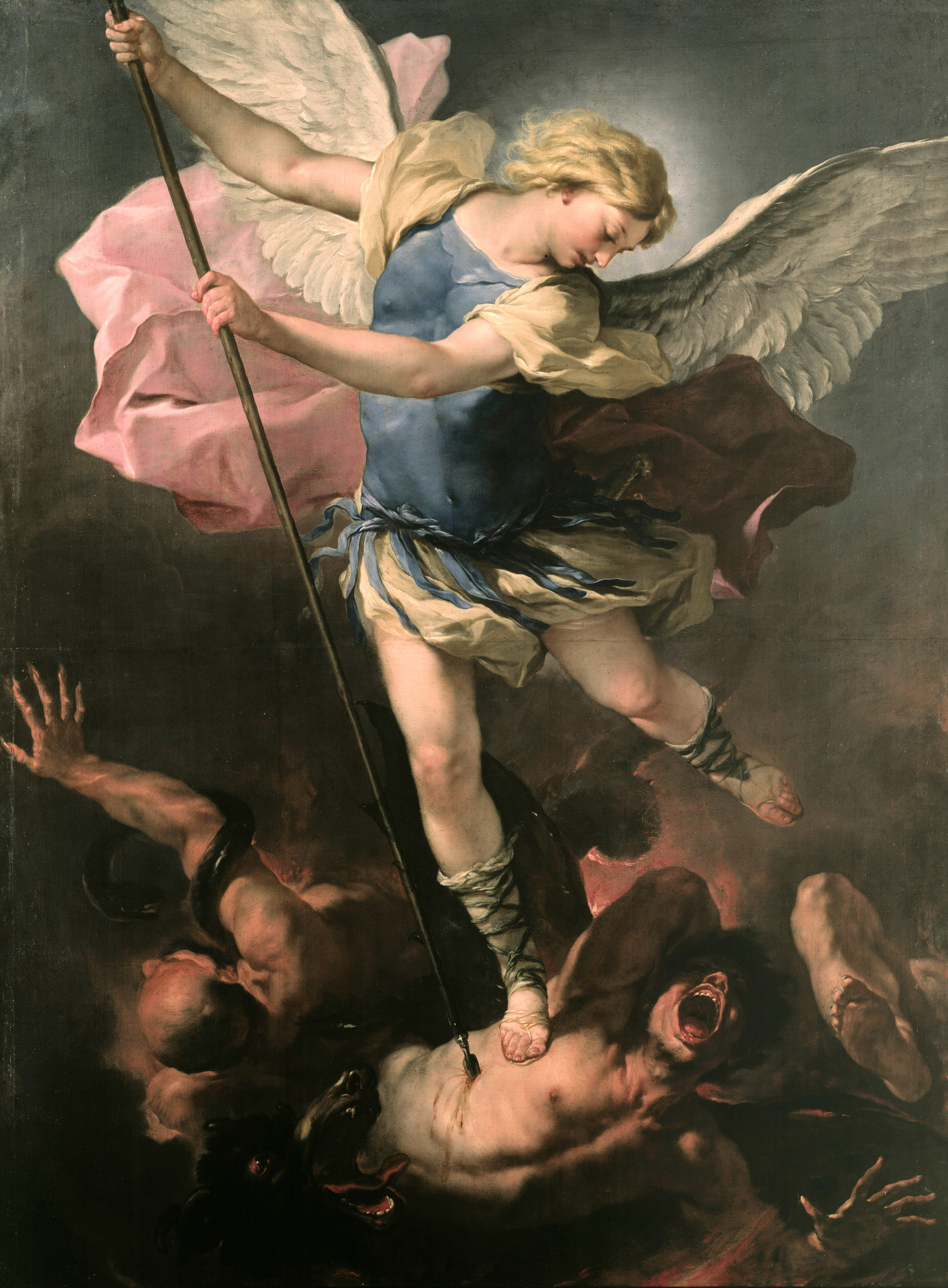
St. Michael, c. 1663, Gemäldegalerie, Berlin

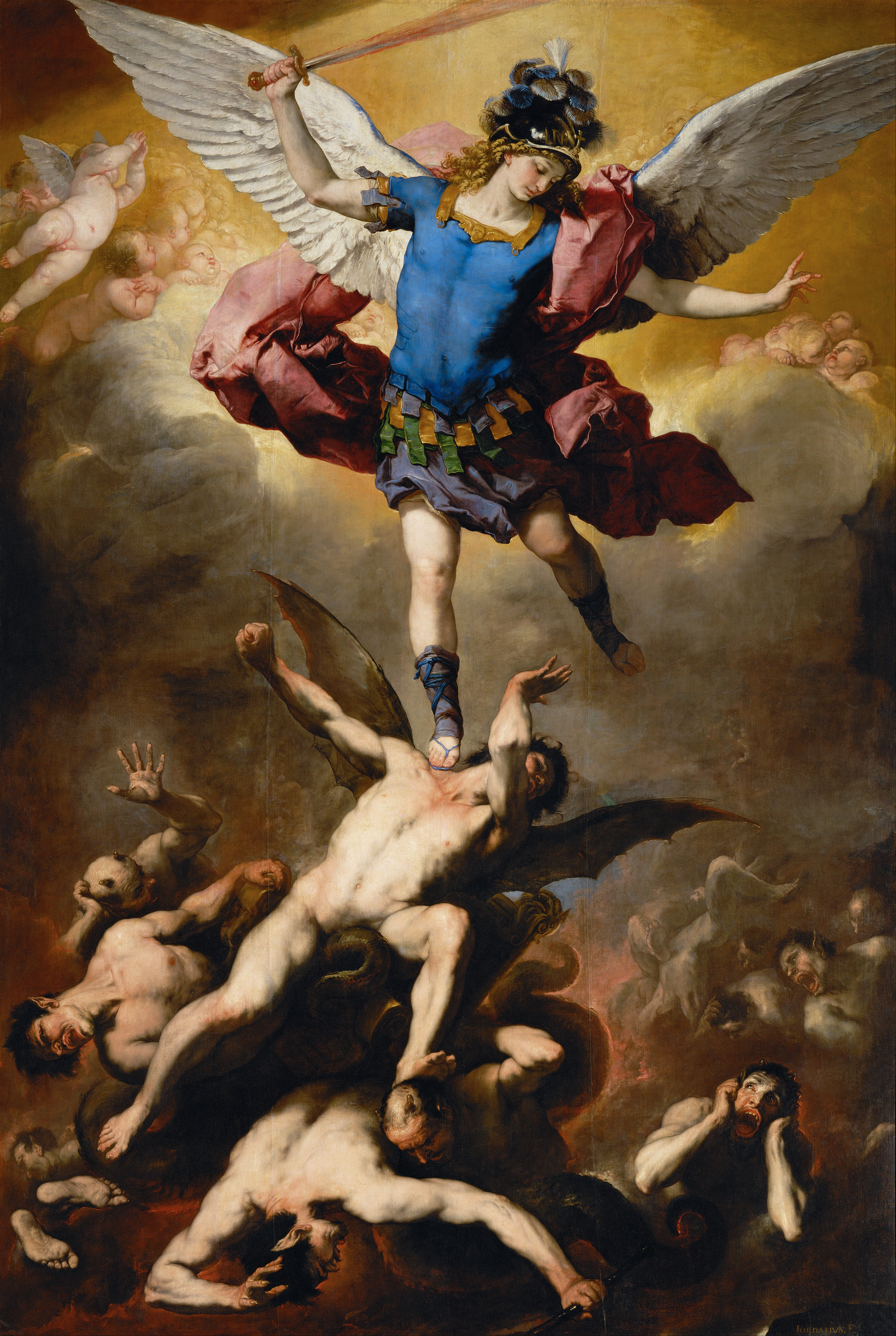
The Fall of the Rebel Angels, c. 1666, Kunsthistorisches Museum, Vienna

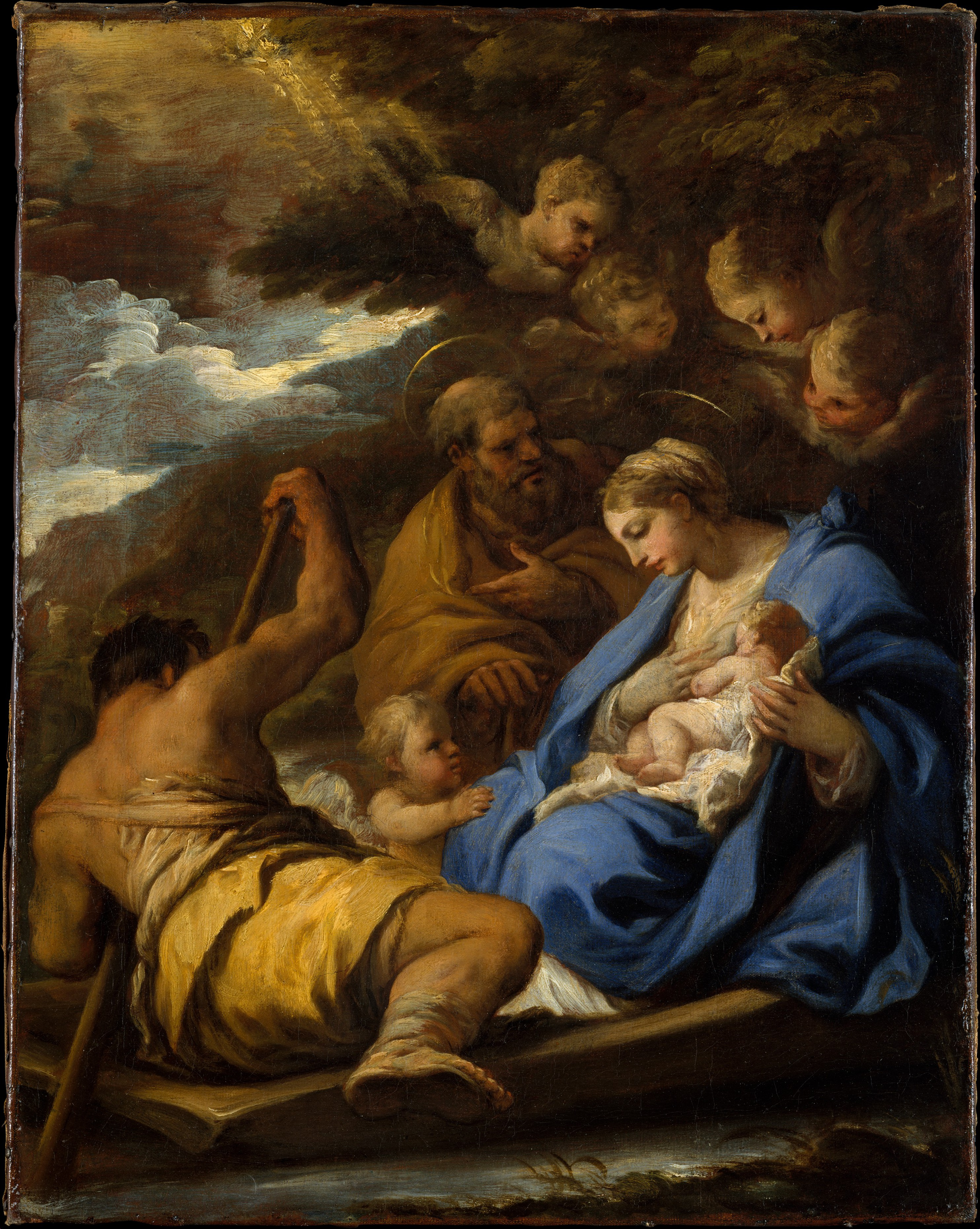
The Flight into Egypt, Metropolitan Museum of Art, New York

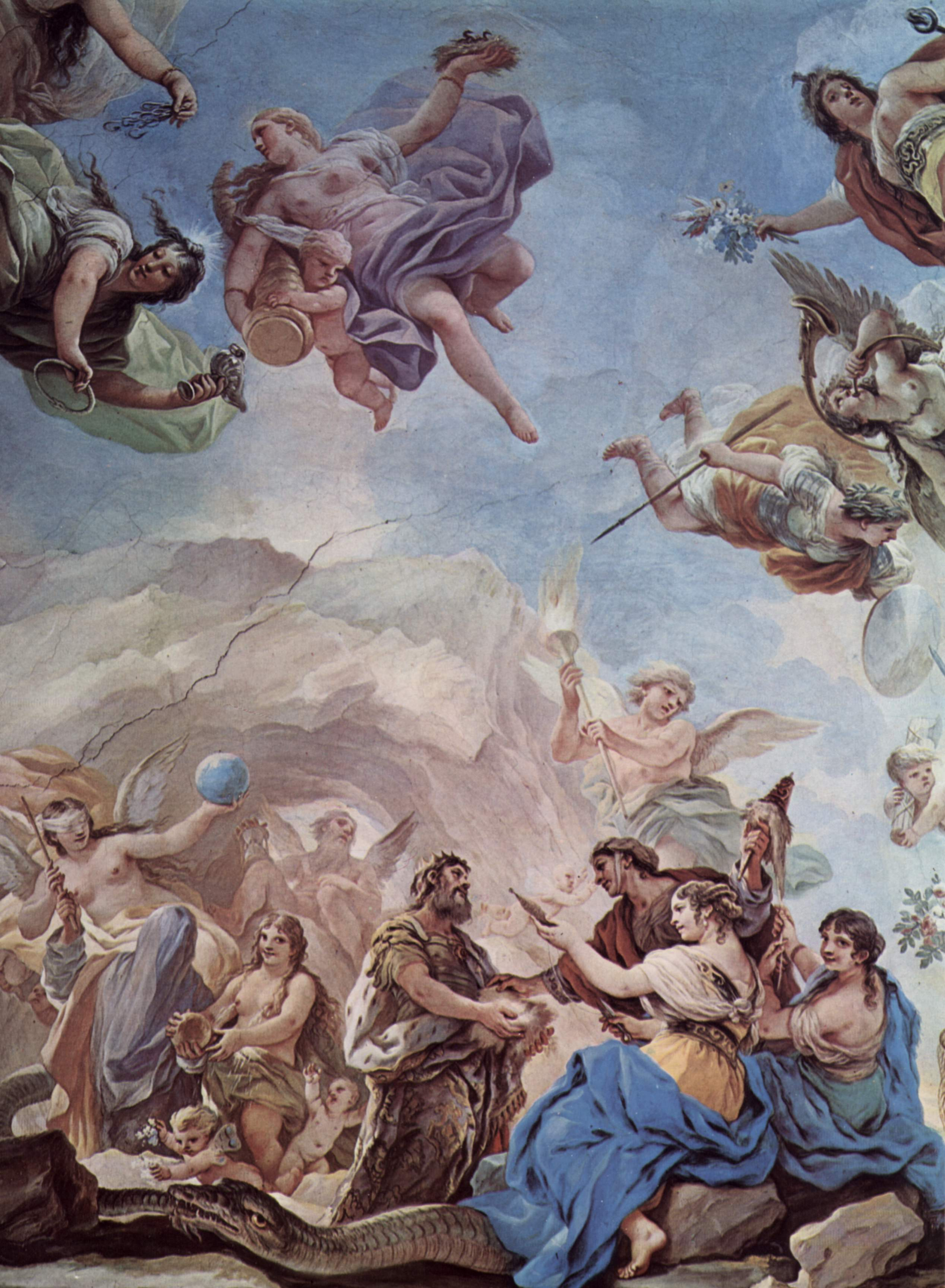
The creation of man, 1684–1686, fresco in the Palazzo Medici Riccardi in Florence

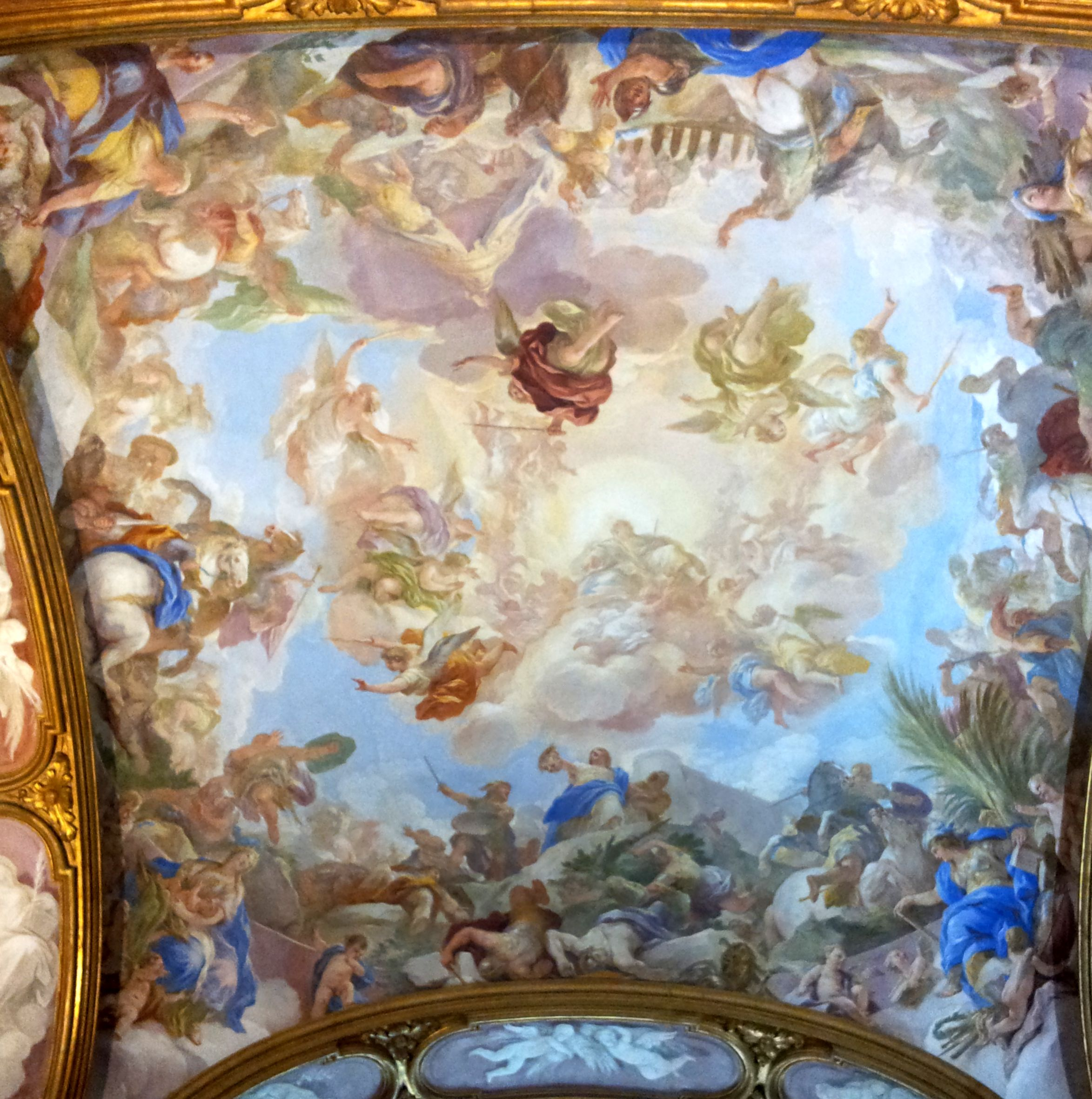
Triumph of Judith, Certosa di San Martino, Naples

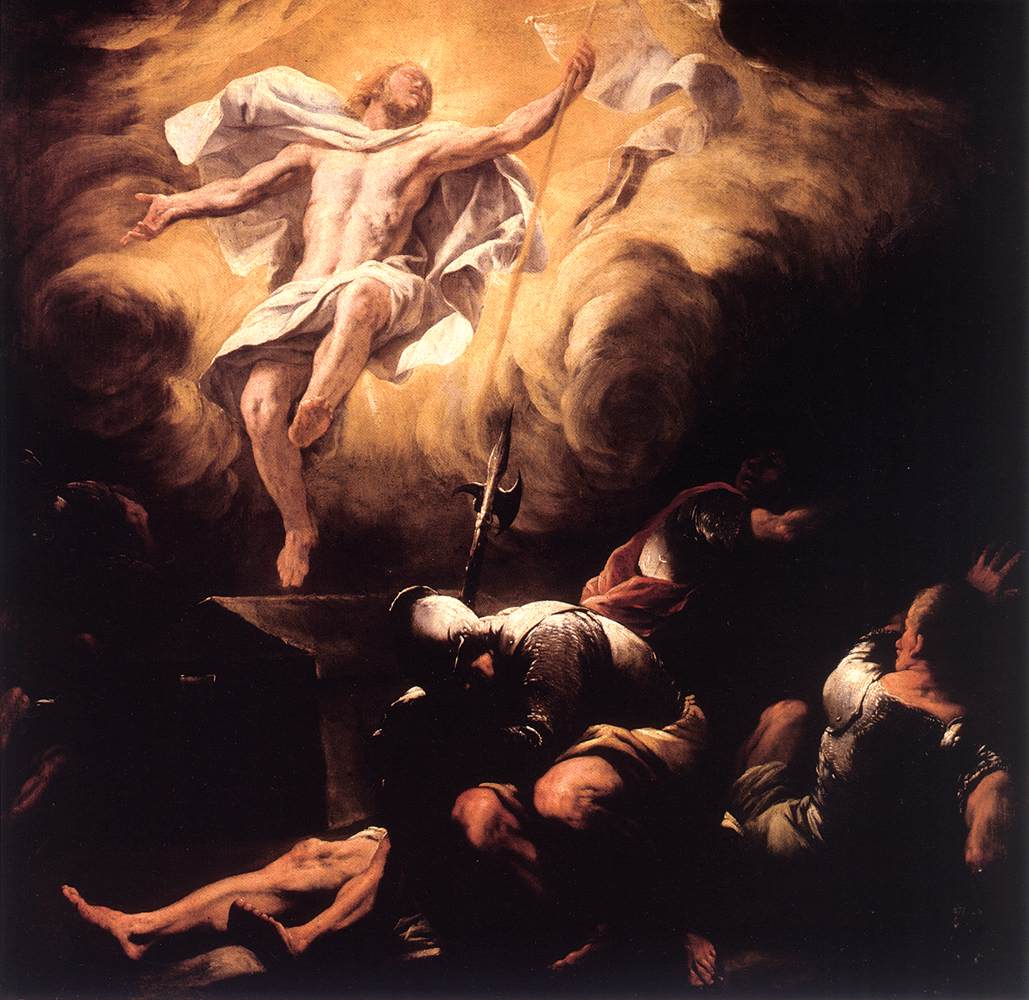
Resurrection, after 1665, Residenzgalerie, Salzburg

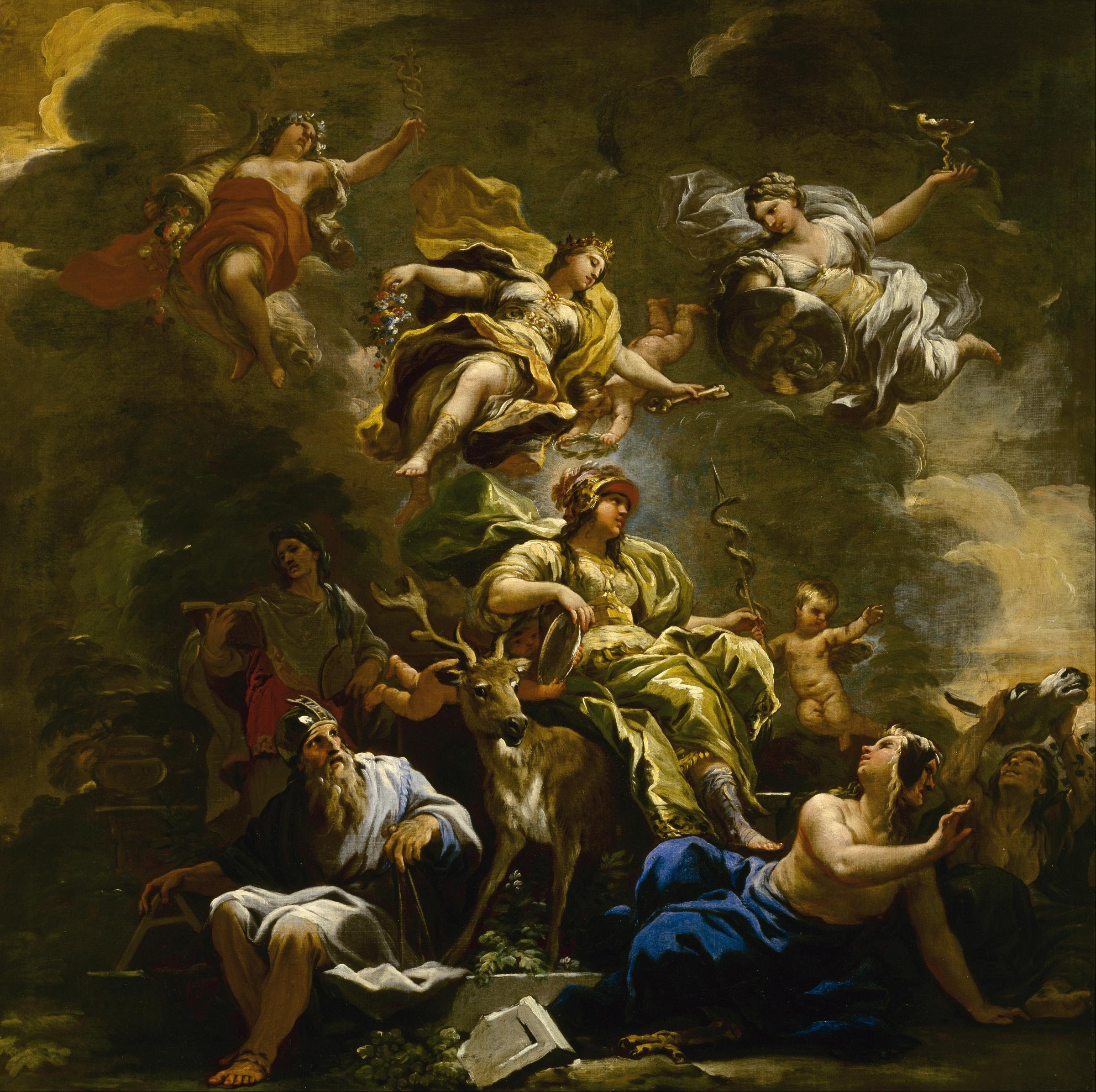
Allegory of Prudence, Museum of Fine Arts, Houston

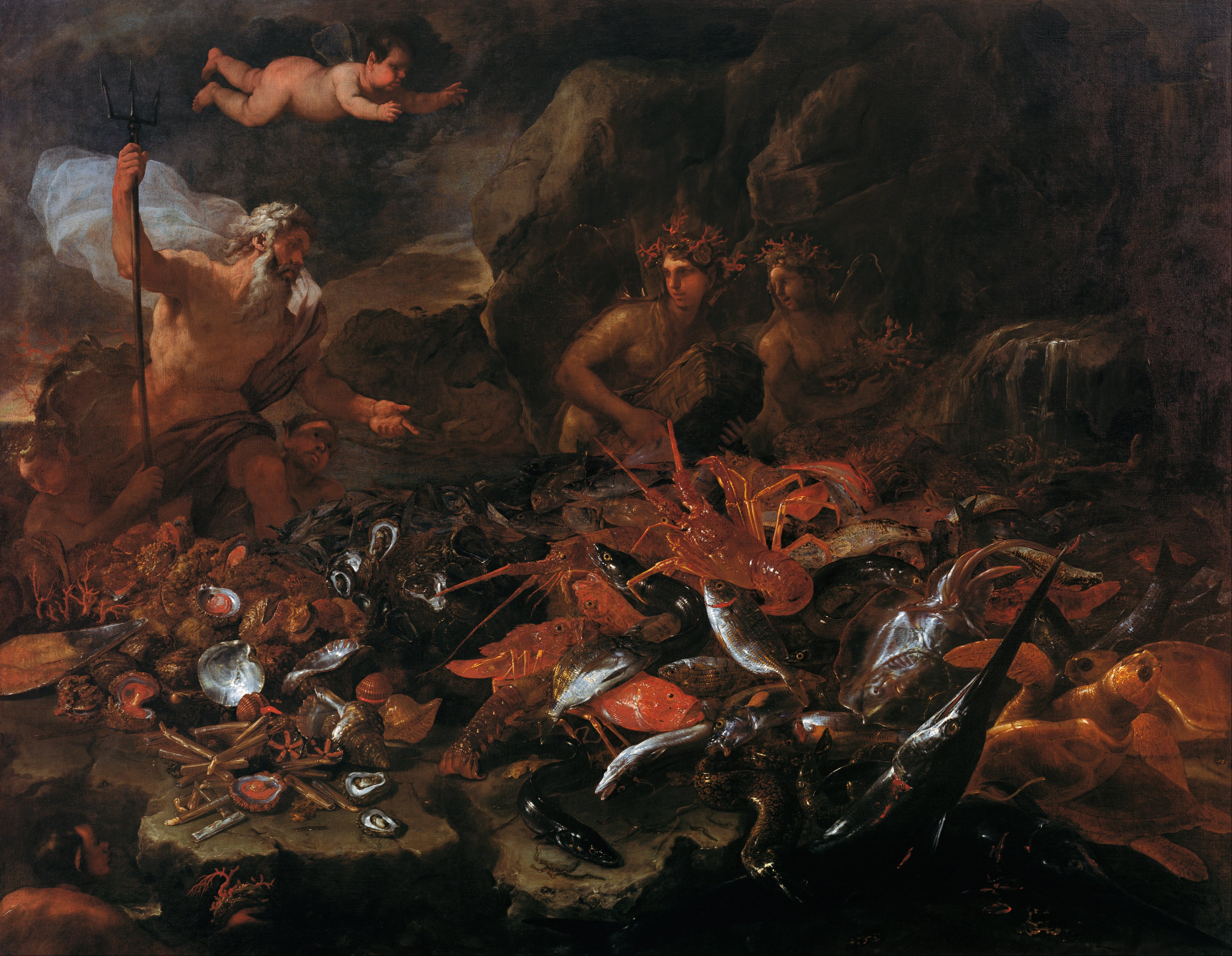
The riches of the sea with Neptune, tritons and two nereids, Art Gallery of South Australia, Adelaide

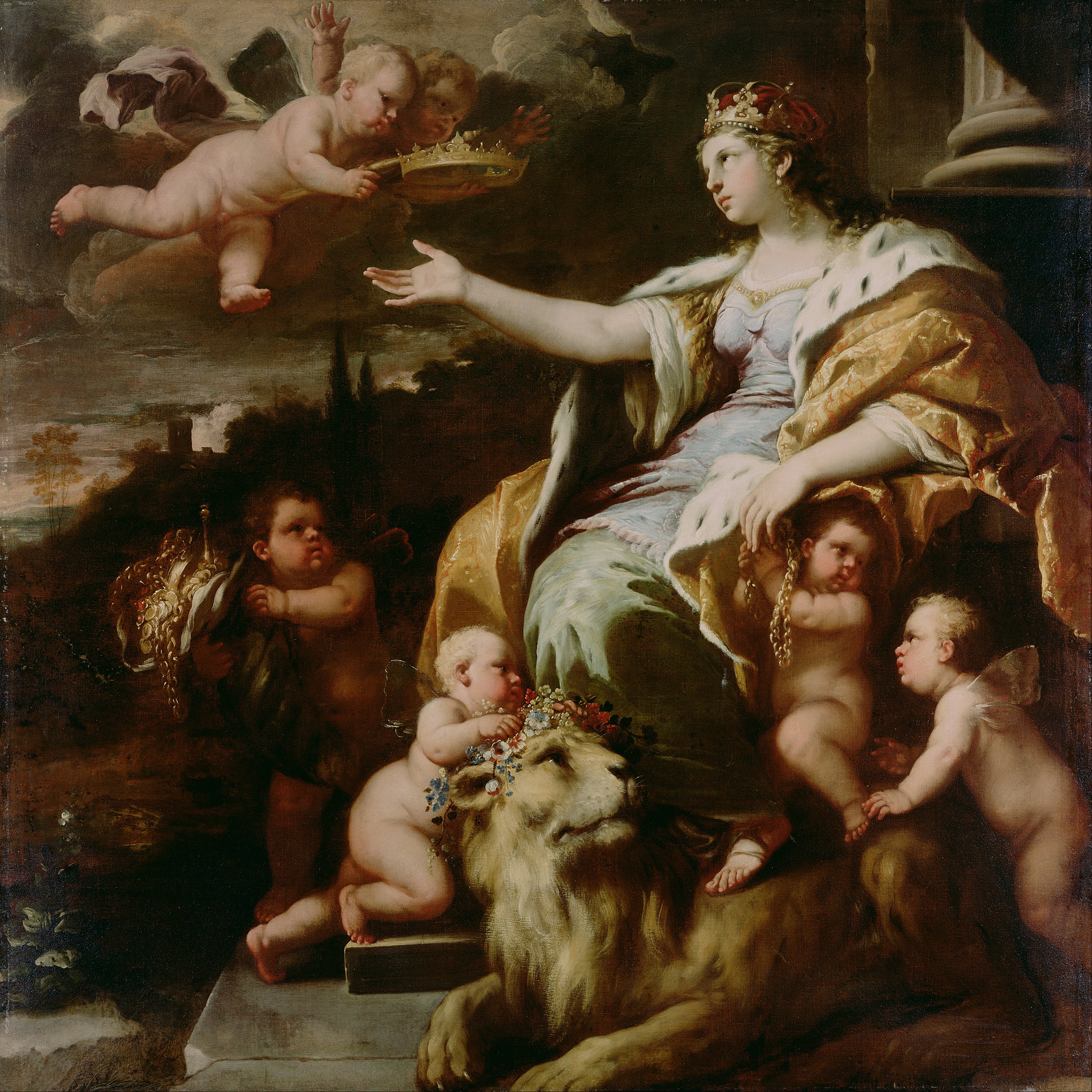
Allegory of Magnanimity, c. 1670, Getty Center, Los Angeles

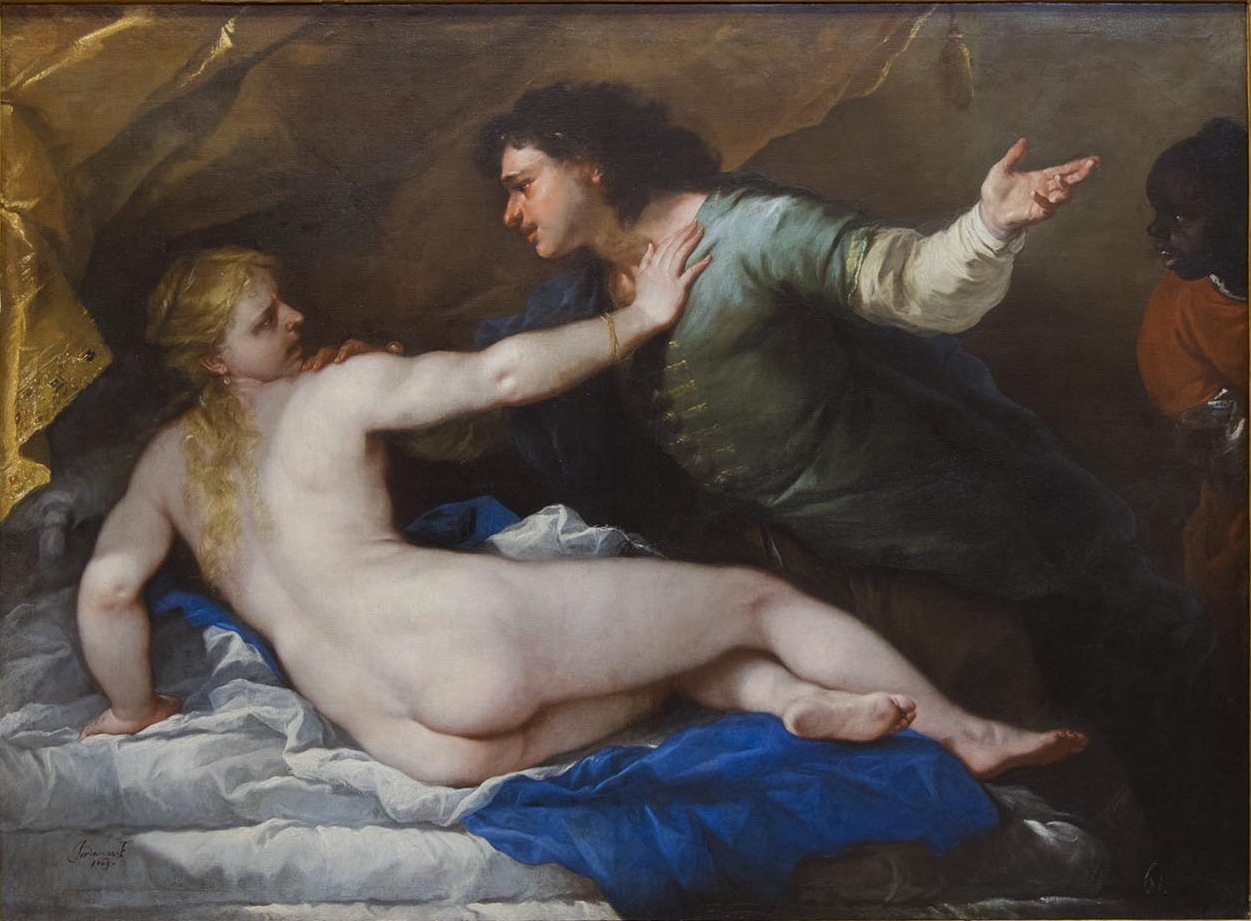
The Rape of Lucretia, 1663, Museo di Capodimonte

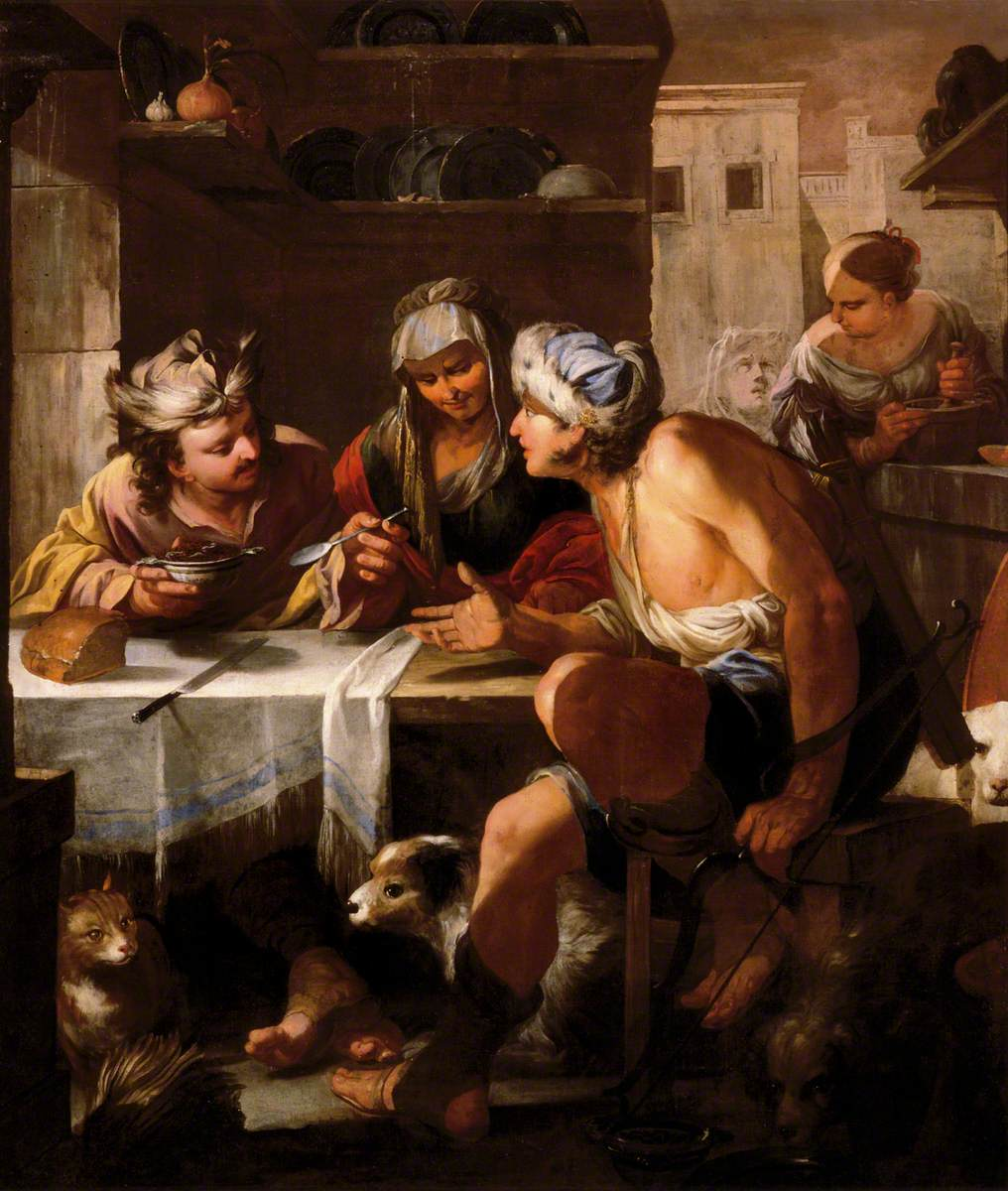
Esau Selling His Birthright, Perth Art Gallery

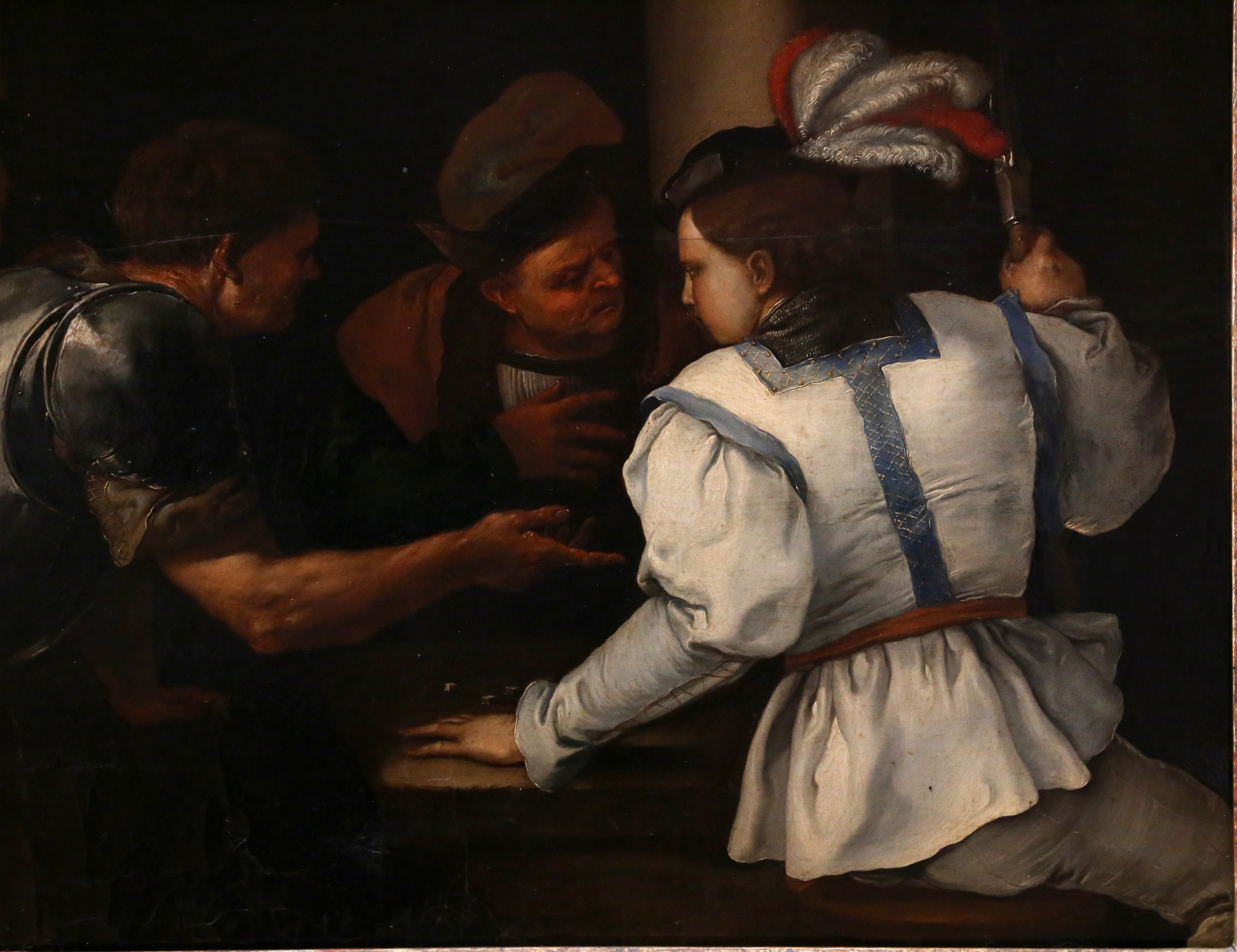
The Dice Players, Gemäldegalerie, Berlin
