= Saint Michael (Giordano) =

Painting by Luca Giordano

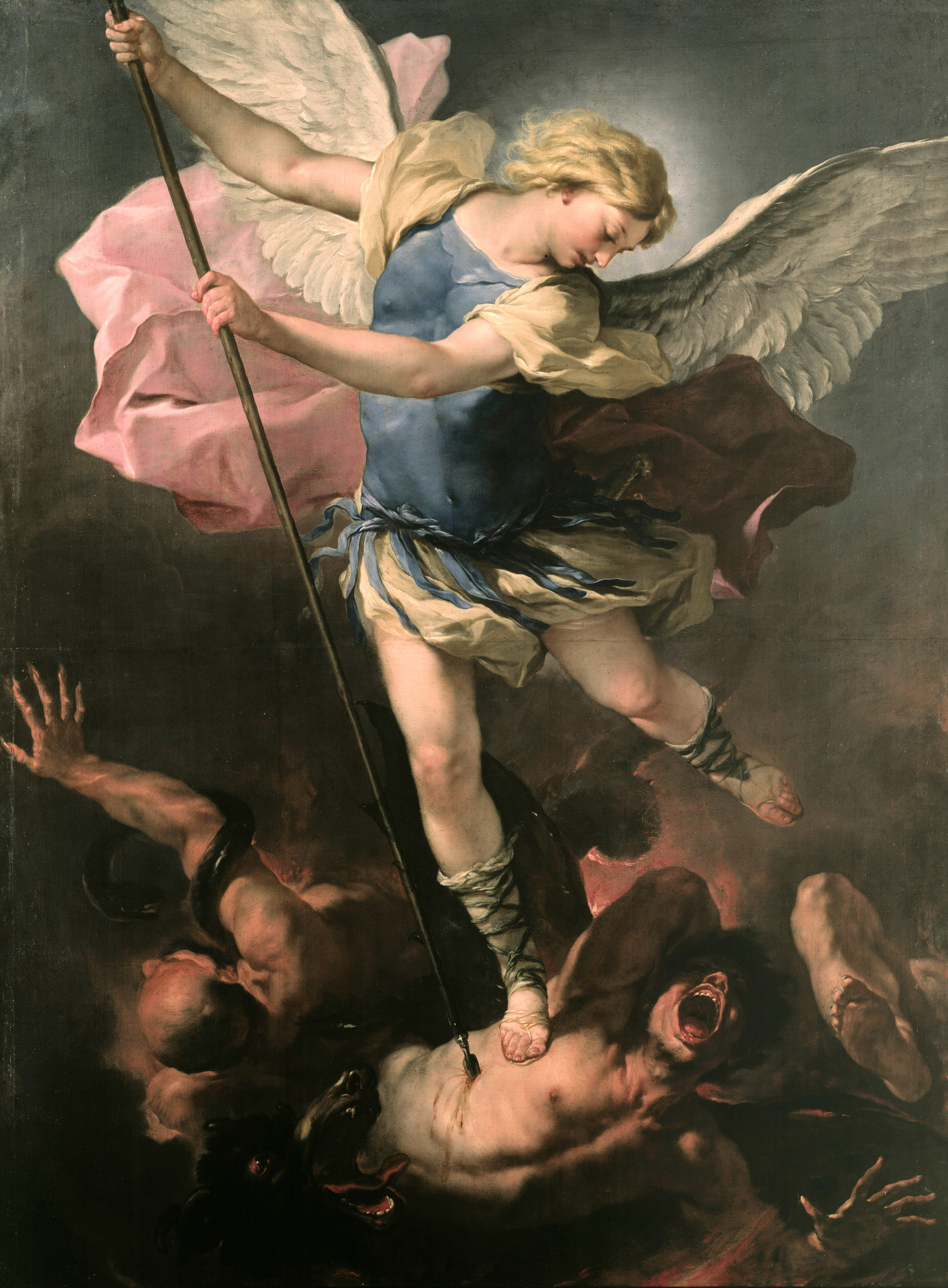
- Artist: Luca Giordano
- Year: c. 1663
- Medium: Oil on canvas
- Dimensions: 196.2 cm × 146.9 cm (77.2 in × 57.8 in)
- Location: Gemäldegalerie; Berlin, Germany

Saint Michael is an oil painting by the Italian late Baroque artist Luca Giordano, painted c. 1663, and now in the Gemäldegalerie, Berlin. Its dimensions are 196.2 × 146.9 cm.

== See also ==
- List of works by Luca Giordano
