= Matteo Pacelli =

Italian painter

Matteo Pacelli (died 1731), born in Basilicata, was an Italian historical painter.

== Biography ==
He studied under Luca Giordano and travelled with Giordano to Spain, where he later returned to Naples with a pension.
