= Pacelli High School =

Pacelli High School may refer to:

- Pacelli High School (Austin, Minnesota) — Austin, Minnesota
- Pacelli High School (Stevens Point, Wisconsin) — Stevens Point, Wisconsin
- Pacelli High School (Columbus, Georgia) — Columbus, Georgia
