= Pedro de Calabria =

Italian painter

Pedro de Calabria (active 1712–1725) was a Spanish painter of the Baroque period.

He was born in Valladolid. He was a pupil of Luca Giordano in Naples, whom he accompanied to assist in his works at Madrid. He painted battle-pieces.
