= The Patron Saints of Naples Adoring Christ on the Cross =

Painting by Luca Giordano

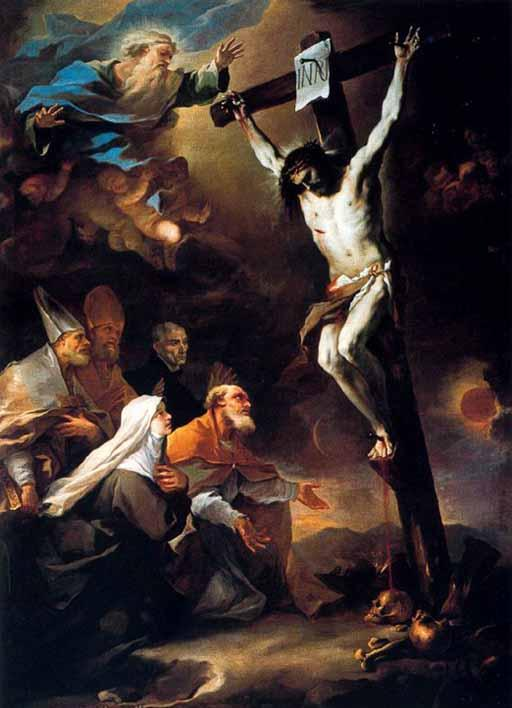
The Patron Saints of Naples Adoring Christ on the Cross (1660–1661) by Luca Giordano

The Patron Saints of Naples Adoring Christ on the Cross is a 1660–1661 oil painting by the Italian Baroque artist Luca Giordano, now in the National Museum of Capodimonte in Naples. In the bottom left are the saints Baculus, Euphebius, Francis Borgia, Aspren and Candida, whilst in the top left is God the Father.

The work and Saint Januarius Interceding were commissioned by Gaspare de Bracamonte, Spanish viceroy of Naples. They were originally intended for the side altars of the new church of Santa Maria del Pianto in Poggioreale, where most of the plague victims were buried, with the commission for the high altarpiece going to the other major artist then resident in Naples, Andrea Vaccaro. Giordano's two works marked the end of the 1656 plague in Naples.

== See also ==
- List of works by Luca Giordano

== Bibliography ==
- Cassani, Silvia; Sapio, Maria (2001). Luca Giordano 1634-1705. Napoli; Los Angeles: County Museum : Electa. ISBN 9788843585793. OCLC 486832536.
