= San Pietro ad Aram =

Church in Naples, Italy

Basilica of San Pietro ad Aram Basilica di San Pietro ad Aram (in Italian)
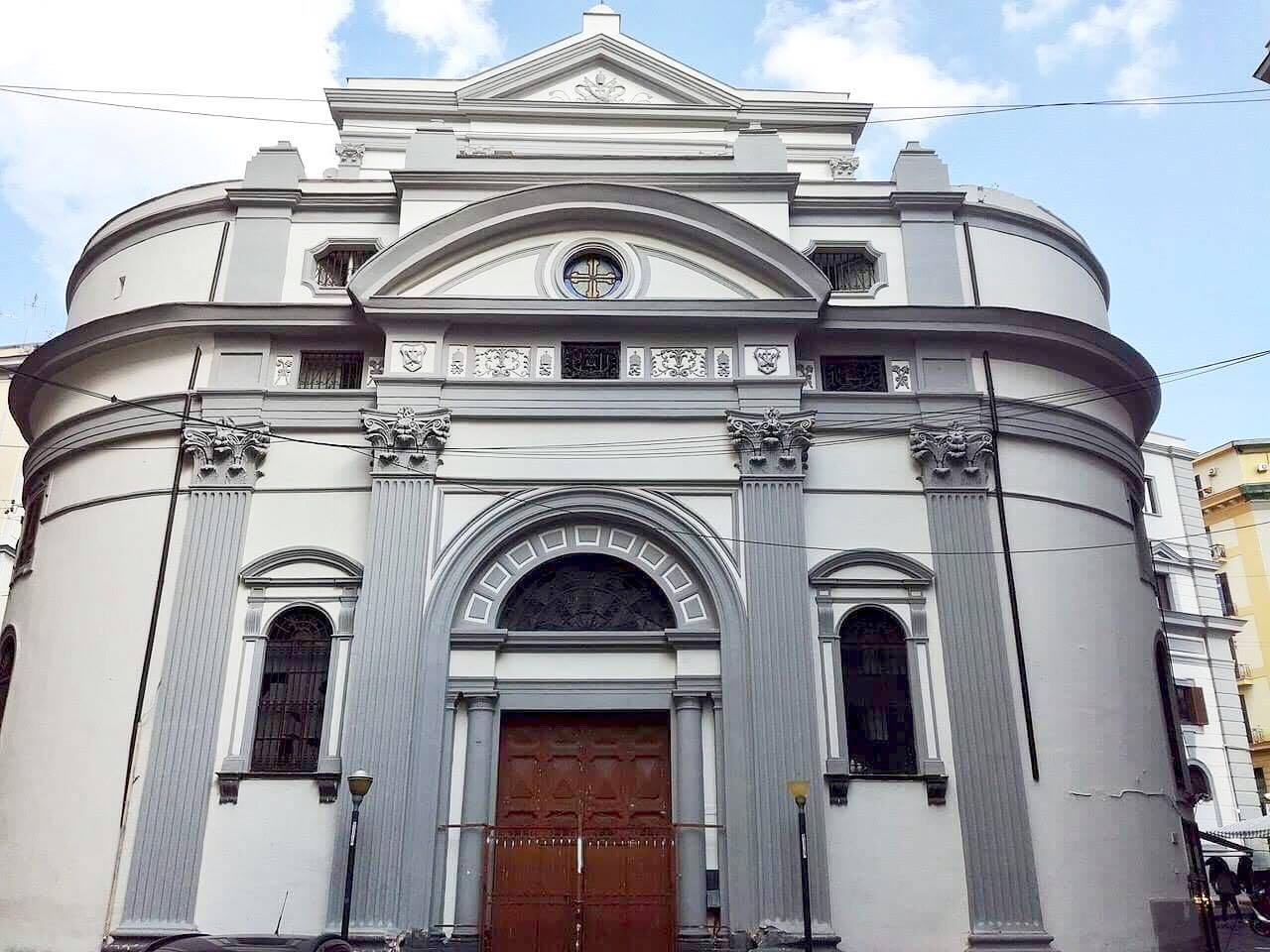
- Façade.

Religion
- Affiliation: Roman Catholic
- Diocese: Archdiocese of Naples
- Ecclesiastical or organizational status: Minor basilica

Location
- Location: Naples, Campania, Italy
- Interactive map of Basilica of San Pietro ad Aram; Basilica di San Pietro ad Aram (in Italian)
- Coordinates: 40.851317°N 14.266723°E

Architecture
- Type: Church
- Style: Baroque

The Basilica of San Pietro ad Aram is a Baroque-style, Roman Catholic church in Naples, Italy. It is located about a block from the church of the Santissima Annunziata on Corso Umberto I.

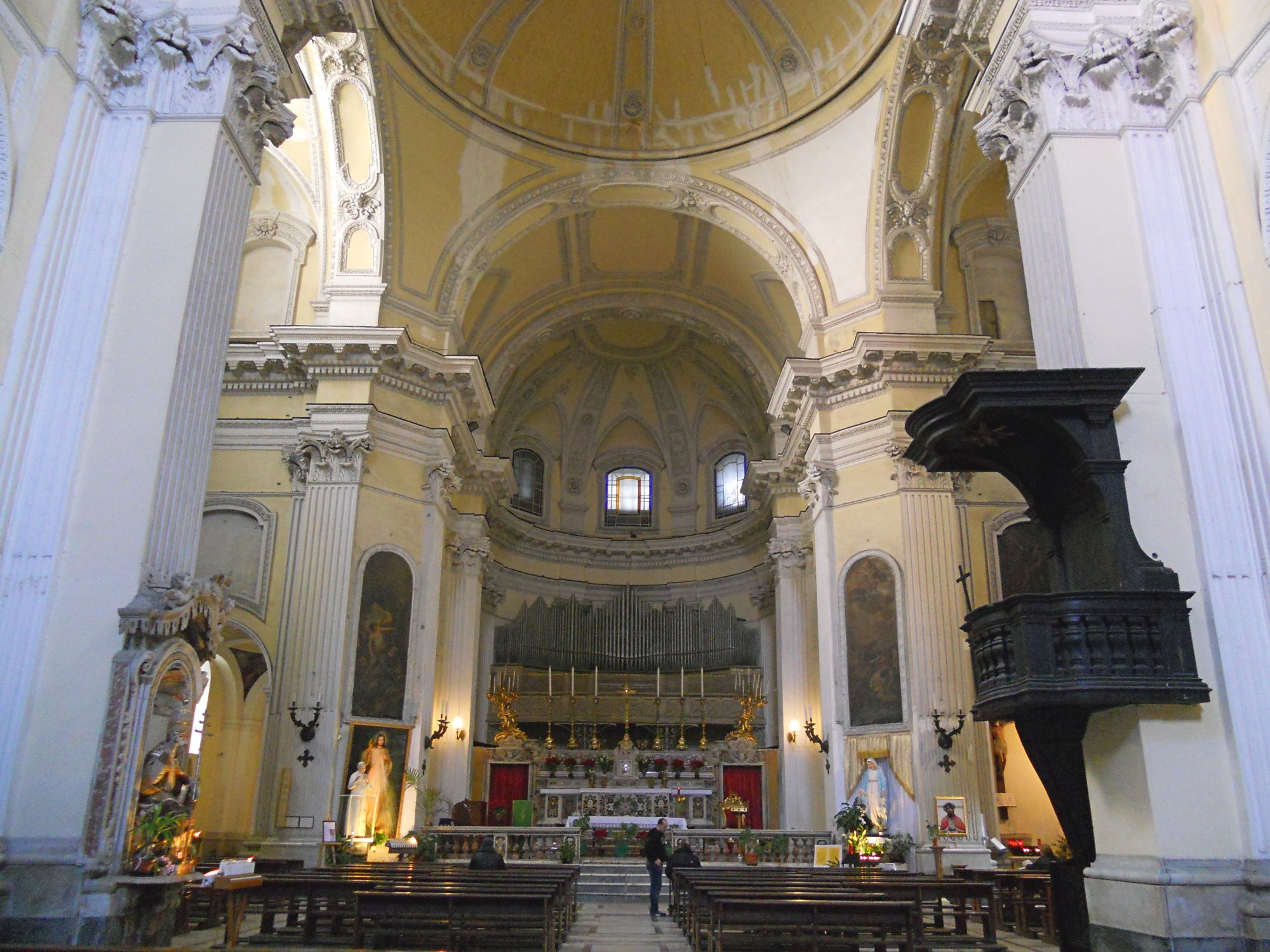
Nave.

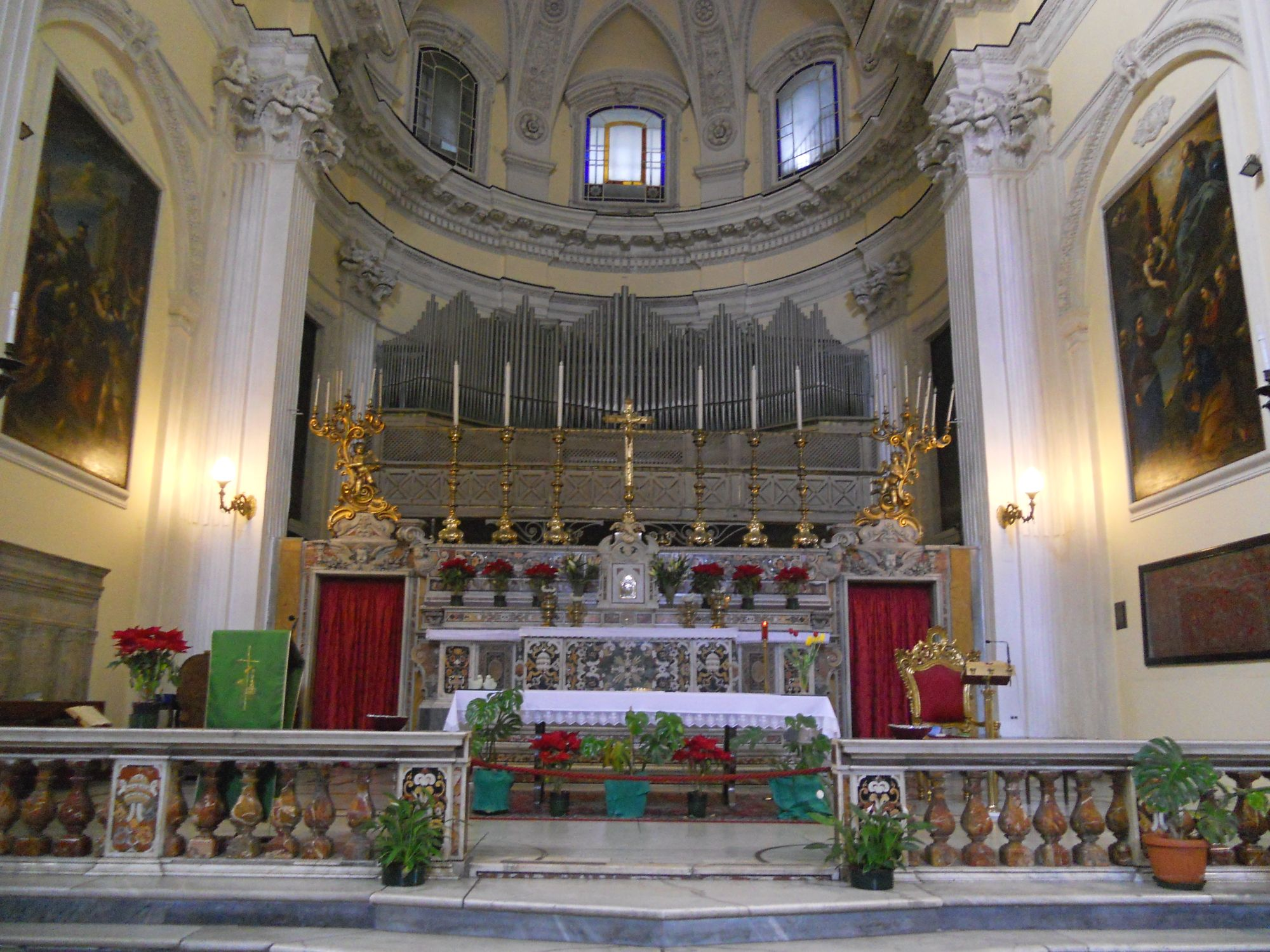
Main Altar.

== History ==
The church is said to host the altar upon which St Peter preached while in Naples, and here he baptized the first Neapolitan converts to Christianity, Saint Candida and Saint Aspreno. In the 16th century, this church was granted by popes the status of celebrating ceremonial Jubilees for the remission of sins.

The layout of the church is that of a Latin-Cross. The present structure, built between 1650 and 1690, owes its design to Pietro De Marino and Giovanni Mozzetta.

The adjacent cloister was destroyed and fragments can be seen in the sacellum or shrine of Sant'Aspreno in piazza Borsa. The portal derives from the Conservatory dell'Arte della Lana, in vico Miroballo. The vestibule has frescoes attributed to Girolamo da Salerno. It has a baldacchino by Giovan Battista Nauclerio.

The first chapel on the right has a bas-relief depicting the Madonna delle Grazie by Giovanni da Nola; and an altarpiece of the Jubilee (1594) by Wenzel Cobergher. The right transept has a St Raphael by Giacinto Diano, a Baptism of Christ by Massimo Stanzione, and a Madonna with St Felice da Cantalice by Andrea Vaccaro. The presbytery has two canvases by Luca Giordano: St Peter and St Paul hug before Martyrdom and a Consigning of the Keys to St. Peter. The wooden choir (1661) was completed by Giovan Domenico Vinaccia.

In the remaining chapels are paintings by Sarnelli, Pacecco De Rosa, Giacinto Diano, Cesare Fracanzano, and Nicola Vaccaro.

A crypt with paleochristian art is located below the church.

== Bibliography ==
- Vincenzo Regina, Le chiese by Napoli. Viaggio indimenticabile attraverso la storia artistica, architettonica, letteraria, civile e spirituale della Napoli sacra, Newton e Compton editore, Napoli 2004.
- Antonio Emanuele Piedimonte, Napoli Segreta, Edizioni Intra Moenia, 2006.
- Translated from Italian Wikidpedia
