= List of works by Luca Giordano =

List of paintings by Italian late-Baroque painter Luca Giordano

This is a list of works by Luca Giordano (1634–1705) and his workshop. Painting titles and dates often vary by source.

== Datable works ==
Image	Title	Date	Dimensions	Collection
	Saint Luke Painting the Virgin (French: Saint Luc peignant la Vierge)	1650–1655	230 x 190 cm	Musée des Beaux-Arts de Lyon (Lyon, France)
	Saint Luke Painting the Virgin (Spanish: San Lucas pintando a la Virgen)	1650–1654	285.2 x 186.1 cm	Museo de Arte de Ponce (Ponce, Puerto Rico)
	Saint Januarius Interceding to the Virgin Mary, Christ and God the Father for Victims of the Plague (Italian: San Gennaro intercede presso la Vergine, Cristo e il Padre Eterno per la peste)	c. 1656	400 x 315 cm	Museo di Capodimonte (Naples, Italy)
	Neptune and Сoronis (Russian: Нептун и Коронида)	second half of the 1650s	112 x 145 cm	
	Crucifixion of Saint Peter (Italian: Crocifissione di san Pietro)	1660	196 x 258 cm	Gallerie dell'Accademia (Venice, Italy)
	The Patron Saints of Naples Adoring Christ on the Cross (Italian: I Santi protettori di Napoli adorano il Crocefisso)	1660–1661	400 x 315 cm	Museo di Capodimonte
	Vulcan's Forge (Russian: Кузница Вулкана)	c. 1660	192.5 x 151.5 cm	Hermitage Museum (Saint Petersburg, Russia)
	Mars and Venus with Cupid (Italian: Venere, Cupido e Marte)	1663	152 x 129 cm	Museo di Capodimonte
	Lucretia and Tarquin (Italian: Lucrezia e Tarquinio)	1663	160 x 83 cm	Museo di Capodimonte
	Lucretia and Tarquin (German: Lukrezia und Tarquinius)		1.35 x 1.85½ m	Gemäldegalerie (Dresden, Germany); lost (?)
	Saint Michael (German: Der Heilige Michael)	c. 1663	196.2 x 146.9 cm	Gemäldegalerie (Berlin, Germany)
	The Fall of the Rebel Angels (German: Erzengel Michael stürzt die abtrünnigen Engel)	c.1660-1665	419 x 283 cm	Kunsthistorisches Museum (Vienna, Austria)
	Apollo and Marsyas (Russian: Аполлон и Марсий)	c. 1665	194 x 152 cm	Pushkin Museum (Moscow, Russia)
	Apollo Flays Marsyas (Italian: Apollo scortica Marsia)			Museo Bardini, Palazzo Mozzi (Florence, Italy)
	The Rape of the Sabine Women (Italian: Il ratto delle Sabine)	c. 1672–1674	257.2 x 314.6 cm	National Gallery of Australia (Canberra)
	The Abduction of the Sabine Women	1675–1680	260 × 295 cm	Art Institute of Chicago (US)
	The Lamentation (Pietà) (Russian: Оплакивание Христа)	c. 1670-1675	155 x 182 cm	Hermitage Museum
	Alpheus and Arethusa	1675		Neues Palais (Potsdam, Germany); painting destroyed in the Second World War
	The Rape of Europa (Russian: Похищение Европы)	1675-1677	205 x 304 cm	Hermitage Museum
	The Triumph of Galatea (Russian: Триумф Галатеи)	1675-1677	206 x 306 cm	Hermitage Museum
	Flock of Sheep (Russian: Стадо баранов)	c. 1675-1680	254 x 358 cm	Hermitage Museum
	Expulsion of the Money-Changers from the Temple (Russian: Изгнание торгующих из храма)	c. 1675	198 x 261 cm	Hermitage Museum
	Birth of St John the Baptist (Russian: Рождение Иоанна Крестителя)	mid-1670s	252 x 320 cm	Hermitage Museum
	Young Bacchus Sleeping (Russian: Сон юного Вакха)	early 1680s	246.5 x 329 cm	
	Judgment of Paris (Russian: Суд Париса)	c. 1682	246 x 329 cm	Hermitage Museum
	Adoration of the Shepherds (French: L'Adoration des bergers)	c. 1688	115 x 136 cm	Musée du Louvre (Paris, France)
	Marriage of the Virgin (French: Le Mariage de la Vierge)	c. 1688	115 x 135 cm	Musée du Louvre
	Sacrifice of Isaac (Russian: Жертвоприношение Авраама)	mid-1680s	217 х 248 cm	Hermitage Museum
	St Jerome (Russian: Св. Иероним)	c. 1699-1700	59 x 75.5 cm	Hermitage Museum
	Appearance of the Angel to King David (Russian: Явление ангела царю Давиду)	1690s	178 х 139 cm	Hermitage Museum

== Undated works ==
Image	Title	Date	Dimensions	Collection
	Death of Cato (Russian: Смерть Катона)	17th century	126.5 х 99 cm	Hermitage Museum
	Cato of Utica (French: Caton d’Utique)			Musée Malraux (Le Havre, France)
	Philosopher (German: Philosoph)	17th century	116.5 x 96 cm	Kunsthistorisches Museum (Vienna, Austria)
	The Rape of the Sabine Women (German: Der Raub der Sabinerinnen)		7 ft 2 in x 8 ft	Gemäldegalerie (Dresden); painting destroyed in the Second World War, February 1945
	Rape of the Sabine Women (Italian: Ratto delle Sabine)		285 x 366 cm	Galleria Nazionale, Palazzo Spinola di Pellicceria (Genoa, Italy)
	(Spanish: El Ángel de la Guarda)		202 x 148 cm	Museo de Cádiz (Spain)
	(Spanish: Predicación de San Juan Bautista)			Museo de Cádiz
	(Spanish: San Miguel)			Museo de Cádiz
	(German: Aeneas am Numicius)		249 x 305 cm	Bayerische Staatsgemäldesammlungen (Munich, Germany)
	(German: Der Apostel Petrus)			Bayerische Staatsgemäldesammlungen
	Archimedes		130.5 x 101.4 cm	Bayerische Staatsgemäldesammlungen
	(German: Auferweckung des Lazarus)		258 x 390 cm	Bayerische Staatsgemäldesammlungen
	(German: Bethlehemitischer Kindermord)		190.2 x 384.6 cm	Bayerische Staatsgemäldesammlungen
	(German: Christus und die Samariterin am Brunnen)		253.5 x 178.5 cm	Bayerische Staatsgemäldesammlungen
	(German: Der cynische Philosoph)			Bayerische Staatsgemäldesammlungen
	(German: Der Schatten des Achill)		126 x 109.2 cm	Bayerische Staatsgemäldesammlungen
	(German: Der sterbende Seneca)		259 x 241 cm	Bayerische Staatsgemäldesammlungen
	(German: Der Tod des Seneca)		84.3 x 118.7 cm	Bayerische Staatsgemäldesammlungen
	(German: Ein alter Gelehrter (hl. Andreas))		117.8 x 96 cm	Bayerische Staatsgemäldesammlungen
	(German: Ein alter Gelehrter)		122 x 96 cm	Bayerische Staatsgemäldesammlungen
	(German: Ein Evangelist)		63.5 x 50.4 cm	Bayerische Staatsgemäldesammlungen
	(German: Ein graubärtiger Gelehrter)		121.7 x 96 cm	Bayerische Staatsgemäldesammlungen
	(German: Entführung der Europa)		250 x 322 cm	Bayerische Staatsgemäldesammlungen
	(German: Esther vor Ahasver)		66.5 x 81 cm	Bayerische Staatsgemäldesammlungen
	(German: Galathea besucht Acis)		248 x 353 cm	Bayerische Staatsgemäldesammlungen
	(German: Greisenbildnis)		69 x 55 cm	Bayerische Staatsgemäldesammlungen
	(German: Herkules tötet den Messus)		249.5 x 308 cm	Bayerische Staatsgemäldesammlungen
	(German: Hl. Hieronymus)		96 x 81.5 cm	Bayerische Staatsgemäldesammlungen
	(German: Hl. Hieronymus)		118 x 92 cm	Bayerische Staatsgemäldesammlungen
	(German: Johannes der Täufer)		46.6 x 63.4 cm	Bayerische Staatsgemäldesammlungen
	(German: Kreuzabnahme Christi)		268 x 390 cm	Bayerische Staatsgemäldesammlungen
	(German: Kreuzabnahme des hl. Andreas)		258.5 x 197 cm	Bayerische Staatsgemäldesammlungen
	(German: Kreuzaufrichtung )		118 x 224 cm	Bayerische Staatsgemäldesammlungen
	(German: Marter des hl. Sebastian)		129 x 100 cm	Bayerische Staatsgemäldesammlungen
	(German: Opferung der Polyxena)		126 x 109.2 cm	Bayerische Staatsgemäldesammlungen
	(German: Selbstmord der Lukretia)		230 x 206.5 cm	Bayerische Staatsgemäldesammlungen
	(German: Speisung der Zehntausend (Die Wunderbare Brotvermehrung))		118 x 224 cm	Bayerische Staatsgemäldesammlungen
	(German: Sterbender Seneca)		248 x 353 cm	Bayerische Staatsgemäldesammlungen
	(German: Versuchung Christi in der Wüste)		254.5 x 179.5 cm	Bayerische Staatsgemäldesammlungen
	(German: Zweikampf des Turnus und Aeneas)		250 x 320.5 cm	Bayerische Staatsgemäldesammlungen

== Doubtful works ==
Image	Title	Date	Dimensions	Collection	Authorship
	Alpheus and Arethusa (Russian: Алфей и Аретуза)	mid-1680s	176.5 x 229 cm	Hermitage Museum	School of Luca Giordano
	Philosopher (Russian: Философ)		114.5 x 85 cm	Hermitage Museum	Attributed to Luca Giordano
				[	

== Bibliography ==
- de Dominici, Bernardo (1729). Vita del Cavaliere D. Luca Giordano, pittore Napoletano. Naples: Francesco RIcciardo.
- Whitfield, Clovis; Martineau, Jane, eds. (1983). Painting in Naples from Caravaggio to Giordano. London: Royal Academy of Arts.
