= Museum of Ceuta =

- Museo de Ceuta
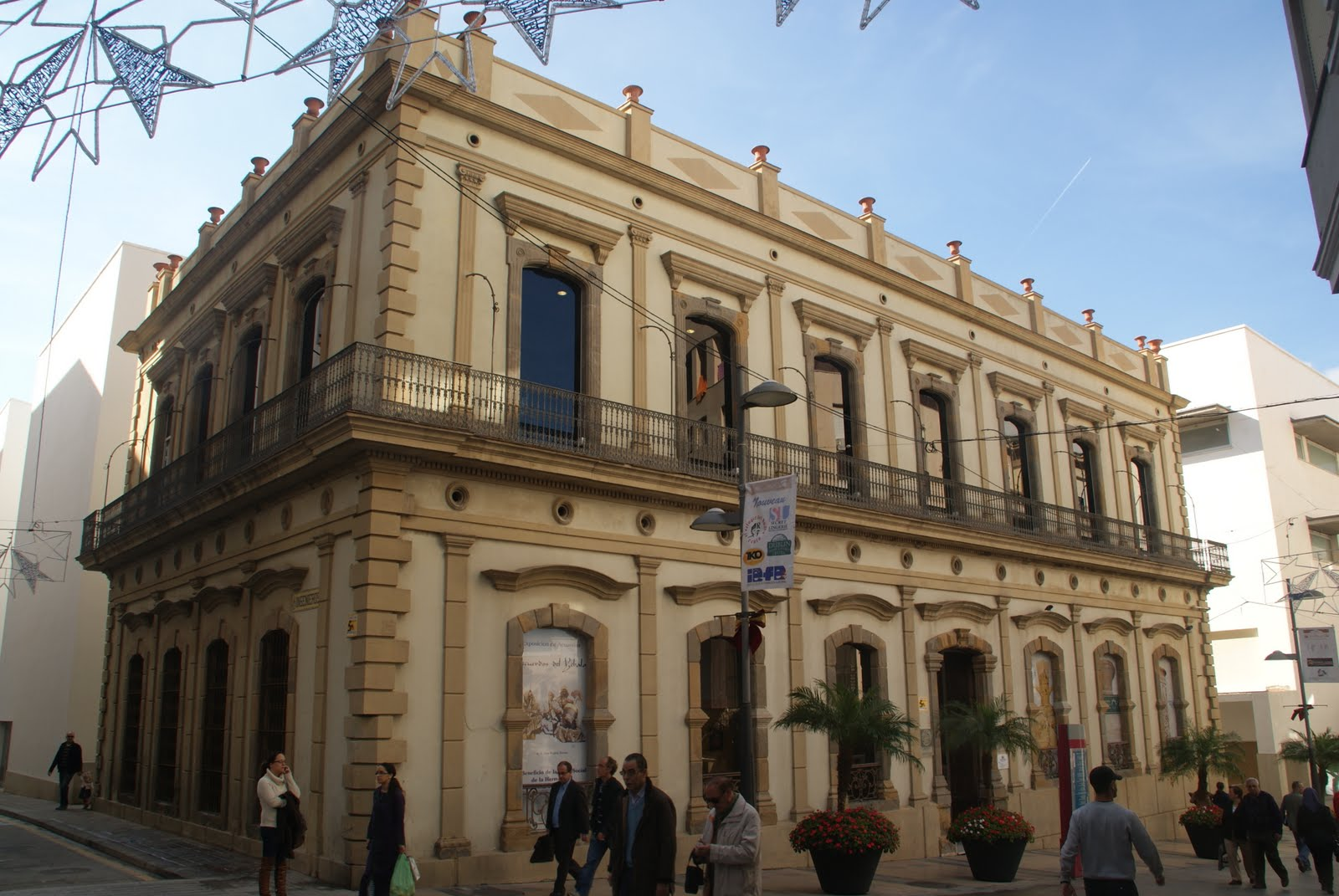
- Military Pavilion of the Ravelin Barracks
- Established: 13 October 1971
- Location: Paseo del Revellín, 30, Ceuta, Spain
- Coordinates: 35°53′14″N 5°18′38″W
- Type: Archaeological museum
- Owner: Autonomous City of Ceuta
- Website: www.ceuta.es/ceuta/museos-ceuta/revellin

The Museum of Ceuta (Spanish: Museo de Ceuta) also known as Museum of the Ravelin (Spanish: Museo del Revellín), is a museum located in Ceuta, Spain. It is based in the former Pabellón Militar del Cuartel del Revellín (Military Pavilion of the Ravelin Barracks), and has a collection of archaeological pieces from the region of the Strait of Gibraltar from the Ancient Age to the Early Modern Age, although it currently holds only temporary exhibitions, while the museum of the Late Roman Basilica of Ceuta acts as a permanent exhibition from Prehistory to the Middle Ages.

== History ==
Archaeology in the city of Ceuta and surrounding areas began in the 18th century with the first excavations by Alejandro Correa da Franca, and experienced great growth during the Hispano-Moroccan War, with excavations both in Ceuta and in other nearby cities, such as Tetouan. However, most of the pieces were moved to the Museum of Cádiz due to the lack of local museums. According to Sureda Blanes, at the beginning of the 20th century many of Ceuta's monuments were in poor state of conservation. This led to the first attempt to establish a local museum in 1920 under the mayorship of Isidoro Martínez Durán, which never came to fruition.

Finally, and in large part due to the work of Carlos Posac, the Ceuta City Council began the process for the establishment of a local museum on 30 December 1964, which was completed on 13 October 1971 with the inauguration of the Municipal Archaeology Hall, attached to the Institute of Ceutan Studies. Due to the lack of room to house the museum's collection, in 1994 the headquarters was moved to its current location, the former Military Pavilion of the Ravelin Barracks. Since 1999, the museum also disposes of the building of the Ravelin of St. Ignatius, which allowed to arrange its collection in a more extensive way and to increase its cultural and outreach activities.

== Site ==
The museum's main building is the former Military Pavilion of the Ravelin Barracks, built in 1900 and renovated in 1989, simultaneously with its designation as Bien de Interés Cultural. The building, in neoclassical style, houses two temporary exhibition halls on the ground floor.

It has a second home in the Ravelin of St. Ignatius, in the Royal Walls of Ceuta, in an 18th-century ravelin renovated by Juan Miguel Hernández León that houses the museum's Fine Arts section.

== Governance ==
Since the approval of the Statute of Autonomy of Ceuta in 1995 and the consequent transfer of cultural competencies in 1999, the Museum of Ceuta has formed part of the Museum Service of the Autonomous City of Ceuta, which in turn depends on the government of Ceuta. Since its establishment, the museum has had the following directors:

Start year	Director
1971	Alfonso Sotelo
1973	María José Íñiguez Moreno
1980	Emilio A. Fernández Sotelo
1992	José Antonio Alarcón Caballer
1994	Fernando Villada Paredes
2000	José Manuel Hita Ruiz

== Collections ==
The museum's collection is organized in two sections: one of archaeology, located in the main building, and one of fine arts, located in the Ravelin of St. Ignatius.

The archaeology collection was mainly fed by pieces obtained in excavations in the city of Ceuta and surroundings, and is divided into pieces from Prehistory to the Early Modern Age. The collection was expanded in two main stages. The first was mainly due to the archaeological work of Carlos Posac and other researchers, shortly before the museum was established. Amongst these pieces, those from the Roman and medieval Islamic periods stand out, as well as a collection of Punic and Roman anchors and amphorae found by Juan Bravo Pérez.

The second stage corresponds to the work of Emilio A. Fernández Sotelo in the 1980s, which included a large number of medieval ceramics and late antique pieces that were discovered in a late Roman basilica.

In addition to these two large collections, since 1995 the archaeology section also has various pieces from the Madrasa al-Jadida, transferred from its original location in the Museum of Cádiz, and several other pieces acquired by the museum or coming from donations.

The fine arts section, made up of works from the former Municipal Art Gallery, which was absorbed by the museum in 1994, and notably smaller than the archaeology section, is mainly made up of various ornaments acquired by the government of Ceuta since the 19th century along with later acquisitions.

== See also ==
- Museum of Cádiz
