= Patron saints of Naples =

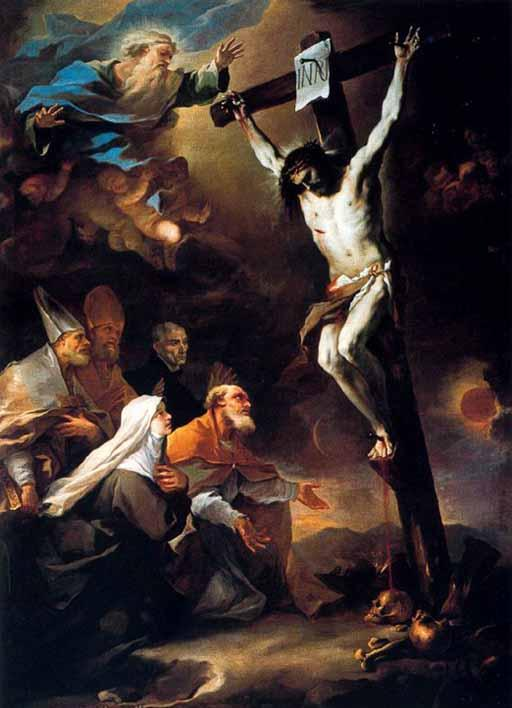
Luca Giordano, The Patron Saints of Naples (Baculus, Euphebius, Francis Borgia, Aspren (kneeling), and Candida the Elder) adoring the Crucifix, 17th century. Royal Palace (Naples).

The city of Naples has more than 50 official patron saints, although its principal patron is Saint Januarius. Second in terms of importance is Saint Aspren (Sant'Aspreno), first bishop of Naples.

== Co-patrons of Naples and years of designation ==
- Saint Januarius (305)
- Saint Andrew Avellino (1622)
- Saint Patricia (1625)
- Saint Francis of Paola (1625)
- Saint Dominic (1641)
- Saint James of the Marches (1647)
- Saint Anthony of Padua (1650)
- Saint Francis Xavier (1654)
- Saint Theresa of Avila (1664)
- Saint Philip Neri (1668)
- Saint Cajetan (1671)
- Saint Agnellus of Naples (1671)
- Saint Severus of Naples (1673)
- Saint Agrippinus of Naples (1673)
- Saint Aspren (1673)
- Saint Euphebius (1673)
- Saint Athanasius of Naples (1673)
- Saint Nicholas of Bari (1675)
- Saint Gregory the Illuminator (1676)
- Saint Claire of Assisi (1689)
- Saint Blaise (1690)
- Saint Peter of Verona (1690)
- Saint Joseph (1690)
- Saint Michael (1691)
- Saint Francis of Assisi (1691)
- Saint Maria Maddalena de' Pazzi (1692)
- Saint John the Baptist (1695)
- Saint Francis Borgia (1695)
- Saint Candida the Elder (1699)
- Saint Mary of Egypt (1699)
- Saint Anthony Abbot (1707)
- Saint Ignatius Loyola (1751)
- Saint Mary Magdalene (1757)
- Saint Irene (1760)
- Saint Emidius (1760)
- Archangel Raphael (1797)
- Saint Anne (1805)
- Saint Aloysius Gonzaga (1835)
- Saint Augustine (1835)
- Saint Vincent Ferrer (1838)
- Saint Alphonsus Liguori (1840)
- Saint Francis Caracciolo (1843)
- Saint John Joseph of the Cross (1845)
- Saint Pascal Baylon (1845)
- Saint Francis Jerome (1845)
- Saint Roch (1856)
- Saint Joachim (1895)
- Saint Mary Frances of the Five Wounds of Jesus (1901)
- Saint Lucy (1903)
- Saint Gertrude the Great (1927)
- Saint Rita of Cascia (1928)
