= Domenico Mondo =

Italian painter

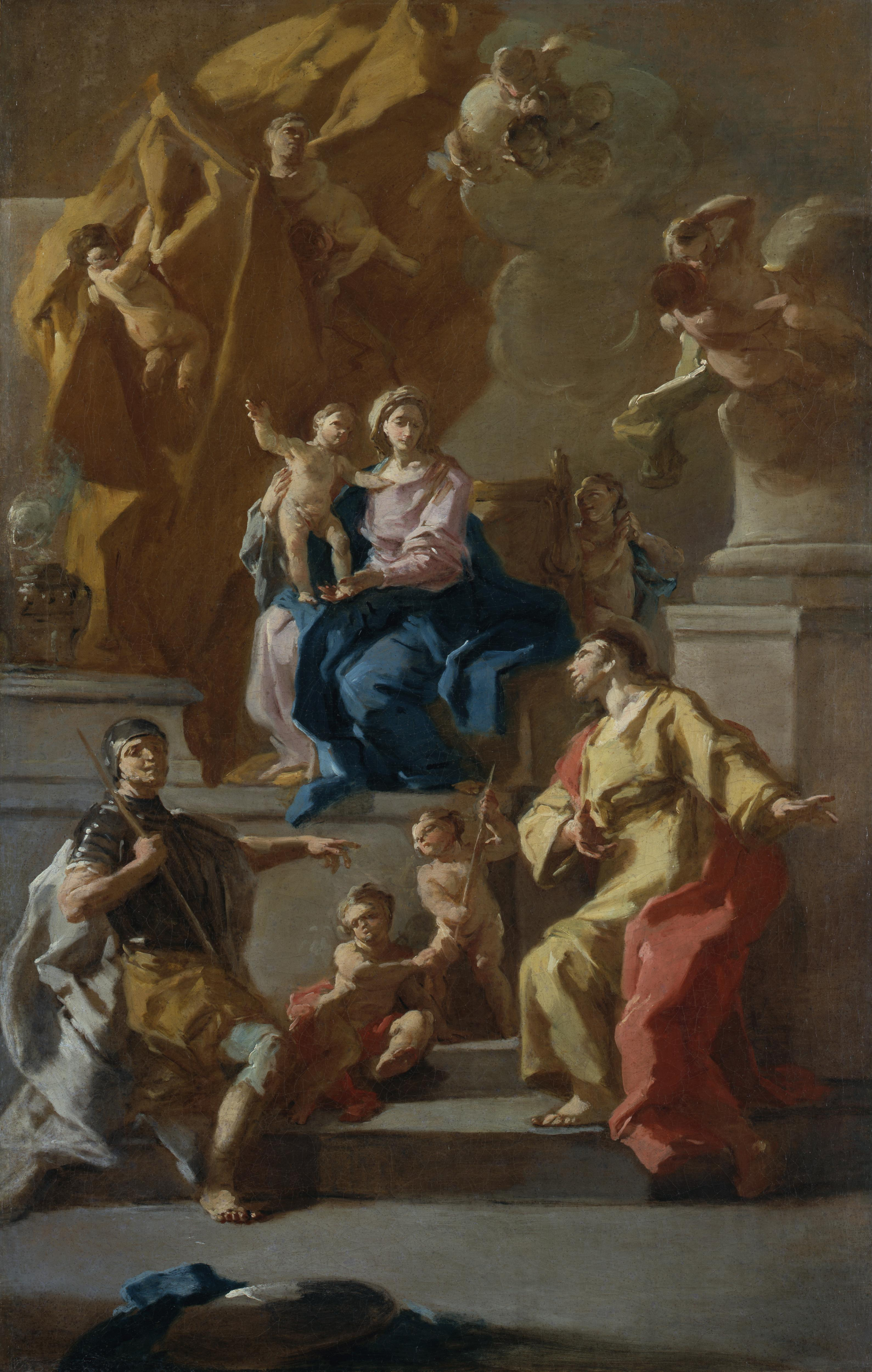
- The Virgin and Child Enthroned, with Angels and Two Saints, c. 1773, Gemäldegalerie, Berlin
- Born: 12 May 1723; Capodrise, Kingdom of Naples
- Died: 10 January 1806 (aged 82); Naples, Kingdom of Naples
- Education: Francesco Solimena
- Known for: Painting
- Movement: Baroque

Domenico Mondo (1723–1806) was an Italian painter, active in both a late Baroque and Neoclassical styles. In the royal palace of Caserta, he painted decorations for the Salone degli Alabardieri, a job for which he was chosen by Luigi Vanvitelli.

== Biography ==
=== Early life and education ===
Born in Capodrise, near Caserta, on 12 May 1723, he studied under Francesco Solimena. His training was dependent on the late style of Solimena, which Mondo applied to a re-evaluation of Mattia Preti’s tenebrism and Baroque solidity. However, already in his early work Mondo achieved a pictorial style very close to the compositional freedom of Luca Giordano. Mondo’s early works include the canvases (e.g. St. Mark, signed and dated 1747) in Sant'Andrea at Capodrise as well as Coriolanus (early 1740s; Naples, Corradini priv. col.), which refers to the work of both Solimena and Giordano.

=== Baroque period ===
During the 1760s and 1770s Mondo developed small-format compositions, generally with secular subjects. These were characterized by a more spontaneous vision of reality and were thus closer to the rocailles and capriccios fashionable at that time. Notable among these canvases is Mercury Appearing to Dido (Naples, Perrone Capano priv. col.), which is one of the masterpieces of late 18th-century Neapolitan art on account of its Rococo preciosity and chromatic refinement. The same stylistic trend can be identified in the eight canvases painted for the church of the Annunziata at Marcianise and dating from the late 1780s.

From these paintings it can be seen that, even in the production of sacred works, commissioned by a patron with a conservative taste that was linked to the triumphant and devotional figurative models popular at court, Mondo provides a pastoral and Arcadian interpretation of the religious subject, using the free pictorialism of his secular work. Another example can be found in the altarpiece for the confraternity of the Rosario chapel, close to the church of the Santissimo Redentore at Caserta, representing the Madonna of the Rosary with Dominican Saints (c. 1786).

=== Neoclassical period ===
From the mid-1770s and throughout the following decade Mondo adopted the classical style of the late Rococo. He achieved this by experimenting with particular aspects of Roman classicism, which he had already assimilated in the four paintings (c. 1762–1767; e.g. St. Peter Baptizing St. Aspren) for Sant'Aspreno ai Crociferi in Naples. While remaining outside the academic artistic environment of the Bourbon court at least until 1789, he worked at the royal palace of Caserta on the paintings of Classical Heroes (1778–1780) for the overdoors of the Sala delle Dame and the famous Apotheosis of the Bourbon Arms (1787) for the Salone degli Alabardieri. These works are a reinterpretation of the tradition of Solimena, in which the iconography and pictorial scheme are solemn and still far from a rational and Neoclassical illustration of sentiments and facts.

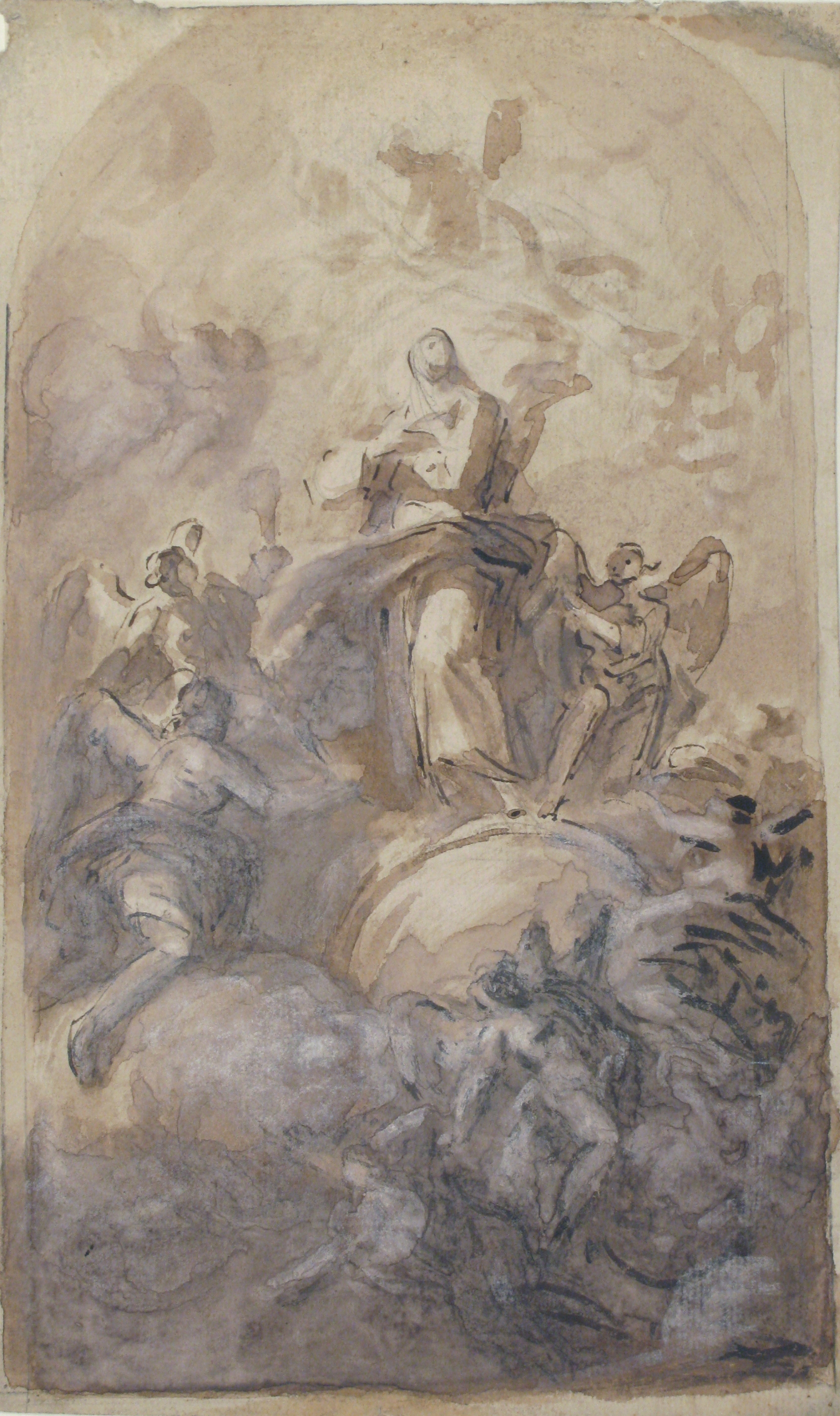
The Virgin Immaculate in Glory, MET, New York

Mondo did not continue for long as a defender of the Neapolitan tradition when faced with new aesthetic demands. In 1789 he won the competition for the directorship of the Accademia di Belle Arti di Napoli, together with the prominent German painter Johann Heinrich Wilhelm Tischbein, and he remained as co-director until 1799, after which he was sole director until 1805. During this time he was active as a teacher and artistic coordinator, fully in tune with Neoclassical and academic currents. Mondo’s work during this period and up to his death in Naples in 1806 is practically unknown, although it is reasonable to suppose a continuation of his graphic work, an area in which the artist had always flourished.

Mondo’s drawings are perhaps more interesting than his paintings and were executed in pen, watercolour and white lead. His frenetic draughtsmanship and flowery style render his drawings very close to a bozzetto, sketch or even a painting. After his death Neapolitan graphic art regressed to a concern with outline and to a non-pictorial form of draughtsmanship.
