= Saint Luke Painting the Virgin (Giordano) =

Painting by Luca Giordano

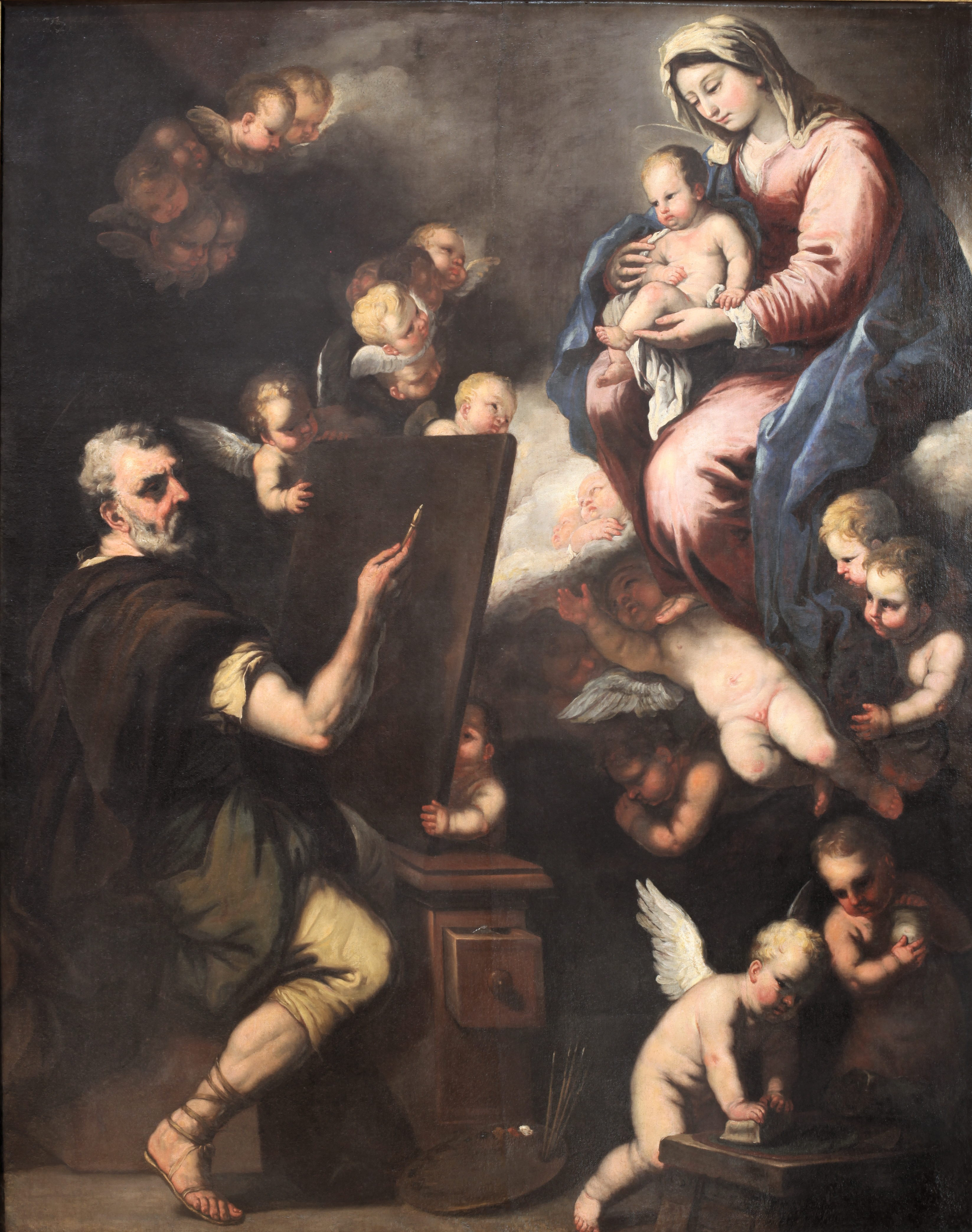
Saint Luke Painting the Virgin (1650–1655) by Luca Giordano

Saint Luke Painting the Virgin is an oil painting executed ca. 1650–1655 by the Italian Baroque artist Luca Giordano, now in the Musée des Beaux-Arts de Lyon. It shows Saint Luke painting the Virgin. Another work by Giordano on the same subject is now in the Museo de Arte in Ponce, Puerto Rico.

== See also ==
- List of works by Luca Giordano

== Sources ==
- François Artaud, Notice des tableaux du musée de la Ville de Lyon, 1832, p. 27
