= Apollo and Marsyas (Giordano, Moscow) =

Painting by Luca Giordano

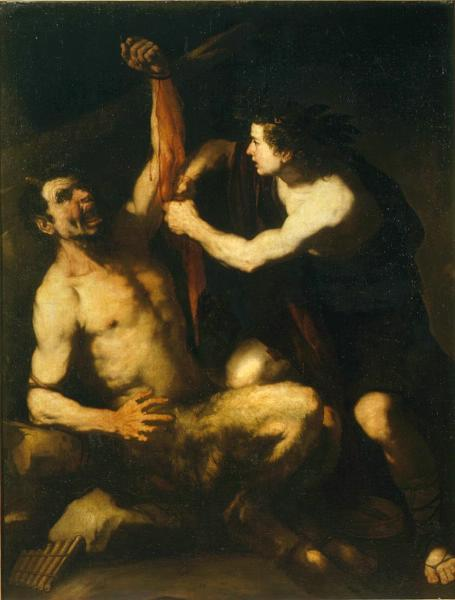
Apollo and Marsyas (c. 1665) by Luca Giordano

Apollo and Marsyas is an oil-on-canvas painting by the Italian artist Luca Giordano, created circa 1665. It is held at the collection of the Pushkin Museum, in Moscow. A variant of the work is in the Bardini Museum, in Florence.

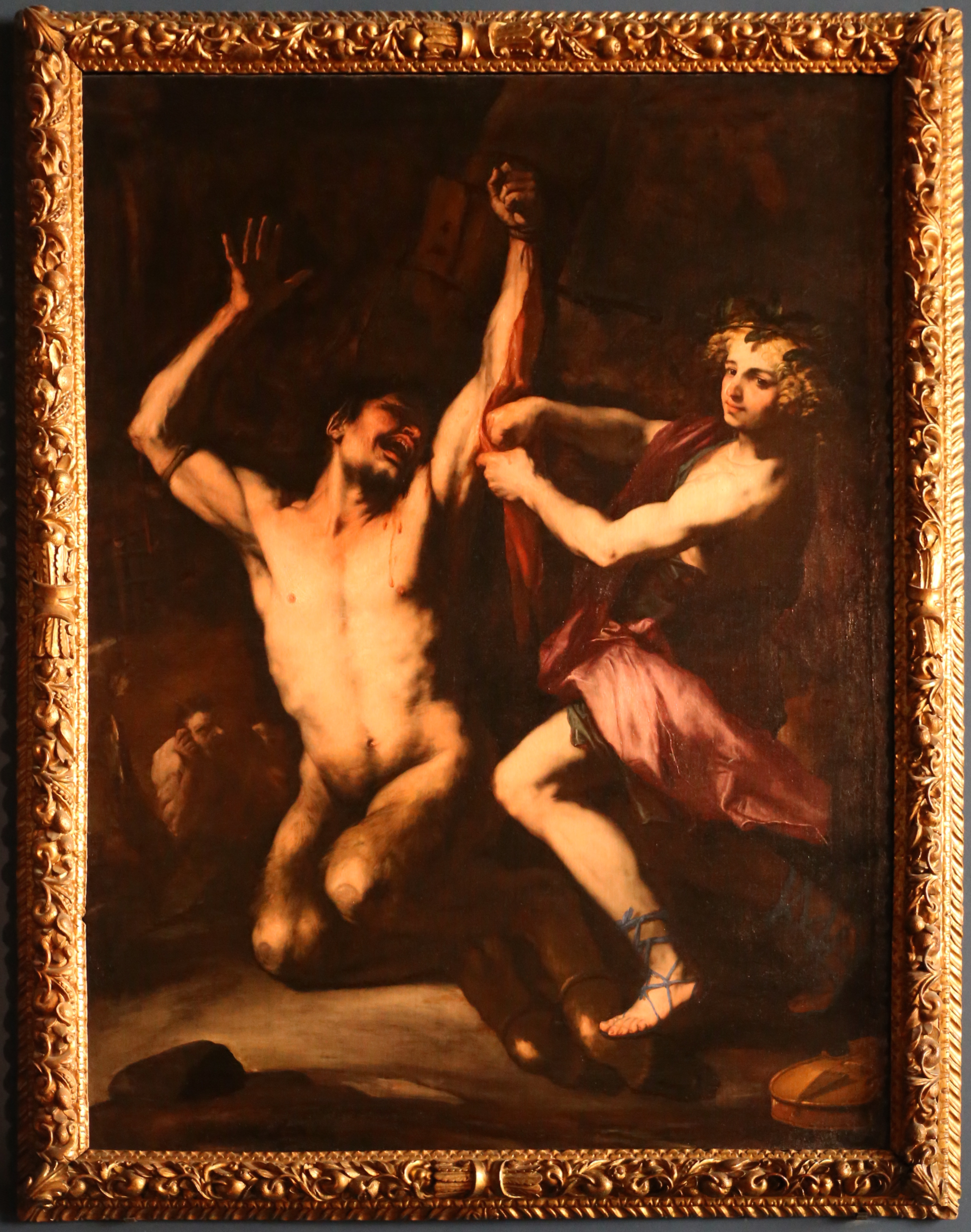
Florence variant

Its early history is unknown. It was already in Nikolay Yusupov's collection by the start of the 19th century with its correct attribution, but was misattributed to Pierre Subleyras in an 1831 inventory of the Yusupov collection. In 1837 it was moved from Yusupov's Moscow palace to the Tiepolo gallery of the Arkhangelskoye Palace, before being sent to the Moika Palace in Saint Petersburg.

After the Russian Revolution all the Yusupov princes' goods were seized by the state and a museum was set up in the palace. In the 1924 inventory it was misattributed again, this time to José de Ribera, but later that year the Yusupov Museum was closed and it was transferred to its present home, where it resumed its correct attribution.

== See also ==
- List of works by Luca Giordano
