= Adoration of the Shepherds (Giordano) =

Painting by Luca Giordano

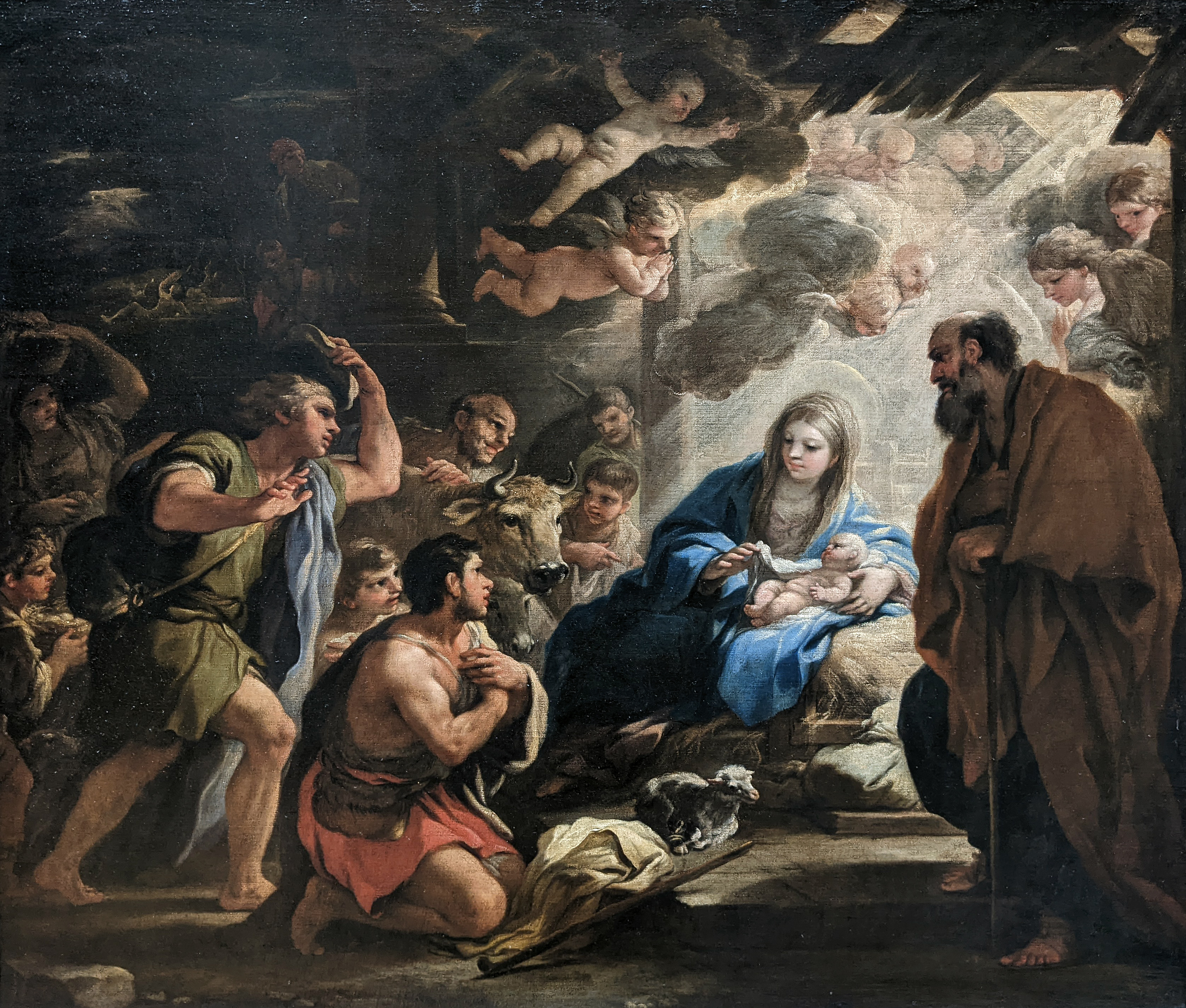
Adoration of the Shepherds (c. 1688) by Luca Giordano

Adoration of the Shepherds is a painting by the Italian late Baroque artist Luca Giordano, executed c. 1688, and commissioned for the queen's apartments in the Palacio Real in Madrid, or perhaps at the Royal Palace of Aranjuez, near Madrid. It was produced at the same time as the same artist's Marriage of the Virgin, as part of a set of paintings of the Life of the Virgin intended for the queen's bedroom. Both works are now in the Louvre in Paris.

== Description ==
The painting shows the Virgin Mary holding the Baby Jesus in her arms, while Joseph is standing next to her, on the right side of the picture. Several cherubs, admiring the Holy Family illuminated by a strong beam of light, are placed on the left side in an elevated position in respect to it. A group of shepherds always approaches from the left bringing gifts as a sign of adoration for the Baby Jesus. The standing shepherd placed in the foreground of the others gives the composition a sense of dynamism, while the shepherd kneeling with his arms crossed on the chest creates an atmosphere of contemplation.

== Provenance ==
It was in the Spanish royal collection until Napoleon's brother Joseph Bonaparte (1768–1844) was installed as King of Spain. He gave the pair to a French general, since when they have been in France.

== See also ==
- List of works by Luca Giordano
