= Álvaro Obertos de Valeto =

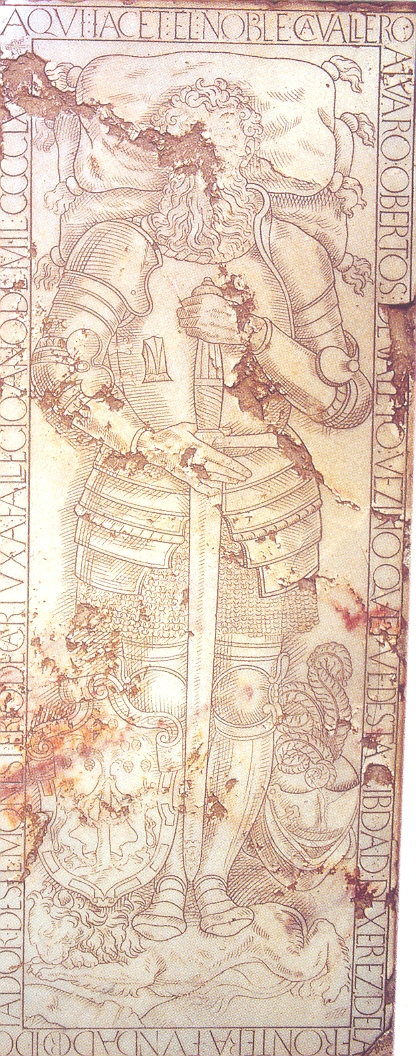
- Tomb of Álvaro Obertos de Valeto
- Born: Álvaro Obertos de Valeto; 1427; Jerez de la Frontera, Spain
- Died: March 12, 1482 (aged 54–55)
- Occupations: Noble knight, founder of the Monastery of the Cartuja de Jerez

Álvaro Obertos de Valeto (Jerez de la Frontera 1427 - Jerez de la Frontera March 12, 1482) was a knight of the Spanish nobility, as well as a pious jurist who donated the land for construction of the Charterhouse of Jerez de la Frontera (la Cartuja de Jerez de la Frontera), the first stone of which was laid on December 17, 1478.

== Biography ==
Genoese family of Fíeseos who participated in the capture of Seville and Jerez in the service of Kingdom of Castile Fernando III and Alfonso X. His parents were Francisco de Morla and Francisca Martinez Obertos de Valeto, the daughter of Miguel Vargas Obertos de Valeto and Juana and Martinez Trujillo. He met the Carthusian prior Hernando de Torres, who gave all his possessions to carry out the erection of a monastery in the municipality of Jerez. He put his property by deed executed before the notary in Seville Alonso Ruiz de Porras, on May 3 the same year of 1463.

With the permission of Cardinal Pedro Mendoza, archbishop of Seville, and the mayor of Jerez don Rodrigo Ponce de Leon laid the foundation stone on December 17, 1478.

The monastery was incorporated into the Order of the General Chapter of Grenoble, held in 1484 and named prior to Don Alonso de Abrego, who was Cazalla.

== Bibliography ==
- Los cartujos en la religiosidad y la sociedad españolas: 1390–1563, Volumen 166, Número 2. Santiago Cantera Montenegro. Institut für Anglistik und Amerikanistik, Universität Salzburg, 2000 - 710 páginas
- Annales ecclesiasticos, y secvlares, de la ... ciudad de Sevilla ... Desde el año de 1246 ... hasta el de 1671 ... Diego Ortiz de Zúñiga. En la Imprenta real, 1795
- Hombres ilustres de la ciudad de Jerez de la Frontera: precedidos de un resúmen histórico de la misma poblacion. Diego Ignacio Parada y Barreto. Impr. del Guadalete, 1875 - 524 páginas
- Arquitectura religiosa del Renacimiento en Jerez: una aproximación iconológica. Cartuja de la Defensión; Convento de Santo Domingo. Antonio Aguayo Cobo. Alienta Editorial, 2006 - 259 páginas
- Protocolo primitivo y de fundación de la Cartuja Santa María de la Defensión de Jerez de la Frontera (Cádiz. Juan Mayo Escudero. Institut für Anglistik und Amerikanistik, Universität Salzburg, 2001 - 341 páginas
- Manuscrito misceláneo de la Cartuja de Jerez del P.D. Gaspar del Castillo ([gest.] 1696): (Ms. 18259 de la Biblioteca Nacional de Madrid). Juan Mayo Escudero, Gaspar del Castillo, Monasterio de Santa María de la Defensión (Jerez de la Frontera, Spain). Institut für Anglistik und Amerikanistik, Universität Salzburg, 2007 - 663 páginas
- La Orden de la Cartuja en Andalucía en los siglos XV y XVI.Santiago Cantera Montenegro, Margarita Cantera Montenegro. Institut für Anglistik und Amerikanistik, Universität Salzburg, 2005 - 141 páginas
- Monasticon Cartusiense, Volumen 185, Número 4, Parte 2, Gerhard Schlegel, James Hogg. Institut für Anglistik und Amerikanistik, 2006
- Boticas monásticas, cartujanas y conventuales en España. José de Vicente González. tresCtres, 2002 - 327 páginas
- Los cartujos en Andalucía, Volumen 2;Volumen 150. James Hogg, Alain Girard, Daniel Le Blévec, Cartuja de Santa María de las Cuevas (Seville, Spain). Institut für Anglistik und Amerikanistik, Universität Salzburg, 1999
- Primer instituto de la sagrada religion de la cartuxa: fundaciones de los conventos de toda Espana, martires de Inglaterra, y generales de toda la orden. Joseph de Valles. M. Barcelo, 1792 - 380 páginas.
- Zurbarán: Museo del Prado, 3 Mayo-30 Julio 1988. Francisco Zurbarán, Museo del Prado. Ministerio de Cultura, 1988 - 461 páginas
- Jérez de la Frontera: guía official de arte. Manuel Esteve Guerrero. Editorial "Jerez Gráfico", 1952 - 213 páginas
- Primer instituto de la sagrada religion de la cartuxa: fundaciones de los conventos de toda Espana, martires de Inglaterra, y generales de toda la orden. Joseph de Valles. M. Barcelo, 1792 - 380 páginas
- Diccionario Heraldico y Nobiliario de los reinos de España. Fernando Gonzalez-Doria. Bitacora 1987.
