= Jerez de la Frontera Charterhouse =

Charterhouse of Jerez de la Frontera
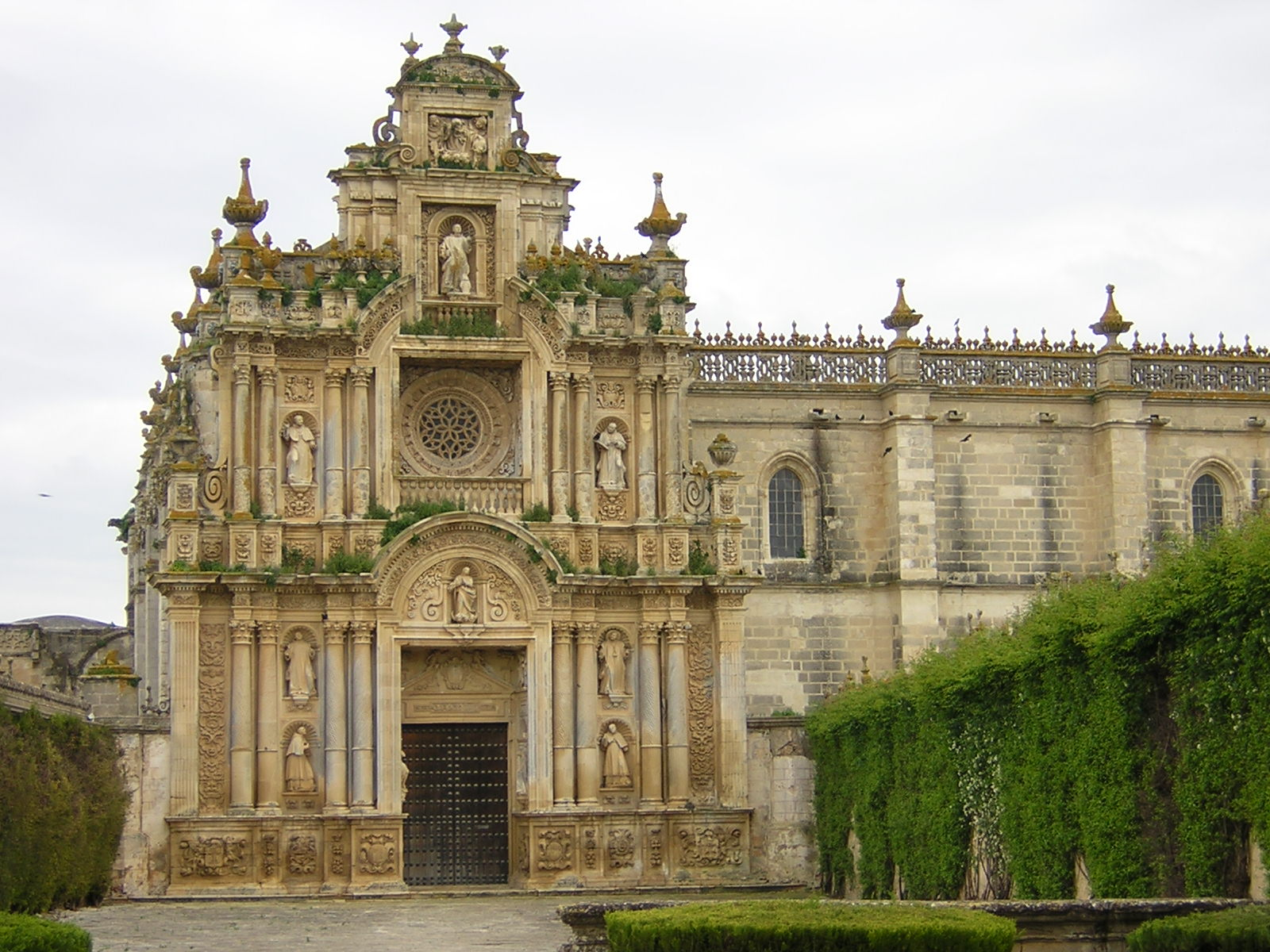
- Interactive map of Charterhouse of Jerez de la Frontera

Monastery information
- Other names: Cartuja de Santa María de la Defensión Cartuja de Nuestra Señora de la Defensión; Cartuja de Jerez de la Frontera Charterhouse of Santa María de la Defensión
- Order: originally Carthusians; now Sisters of Bethlehem, of the Assumption of the Virgin and of Saint Bruno

Architecture
- Heritage designation: Property of Cultural Interest

Site
- Location: Jerez de la Frontera, Cádiz, Spain
- Coordinates: 36°39′17.56″N 6°5′36.68″W

Charterhouse of Jerez de la Frontera
- Cartuja de Jerez de la Frontera (Spanish)
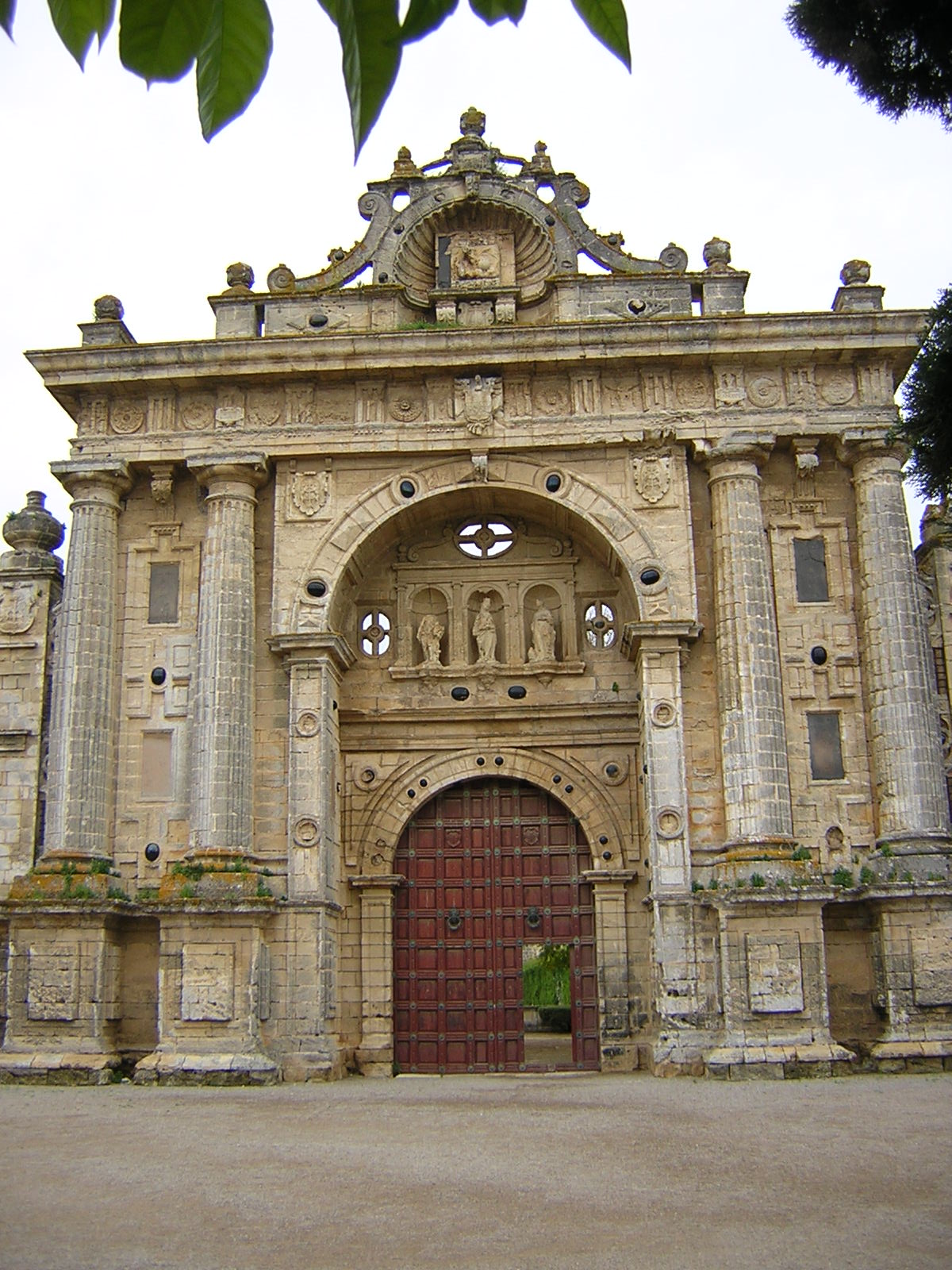

- Location within Spain
- Location: Jerez de la Frontera, Spain

Spanish Cultural Heritage
- Official name: Cartuja de Jerez de la Frontera
- Type: Non-movable
- Criteria: Monument
- Designated: 1856
- Reference no.: RI-51-0000004

The Charterhouse of Jerez de la Frontera (Spanish: la Cartuja de Jerez de la Frontera) or Charterhouse of Santa María de la Defensión (Spanish: la Cartuja de Santa María de la Defensión; also la Cartuja de Nuestra Señora de la Defensión) is a monastery in Jerez de la Frontera, Cádiz, Spain. Its architecture is of a Late Gothic style, corresponding to the start of construction in the 15th century, with Baroque aspects dating from the 17th century. The building, completed in the 17th century, has been protected by the Spanish government since the mid-19th century under a heritage listing.

The Renaissance entryway, designed by Andrés de Ribera, is of particular interest, as are the Chapel of Santa María, and the small Gothic cloister designed by Juan Martínez Montañés. The choir stalls are by Juan de Oviedo de la Bandera (1565–1625); they were originally made for the Convento-Iglesia de la Merced in Sanlúcar de Barrameda and were transferred to the monastery in 1960. The paintings by Juan de la Roelas currently at the monastery also come from that church. Conversely, the Museo de Cádiz preserves numerous paintings by Francisco Zurbarán that were originally from the monastery.

Nowadays, the Sisters of Bethlehem, of the Assumption of the Virgin, and of Saint Bruno continue the long Roman Catholic monastic and spiritual tradition that had been carried on more than five centuries by the Carthusian fathers.

== History ==
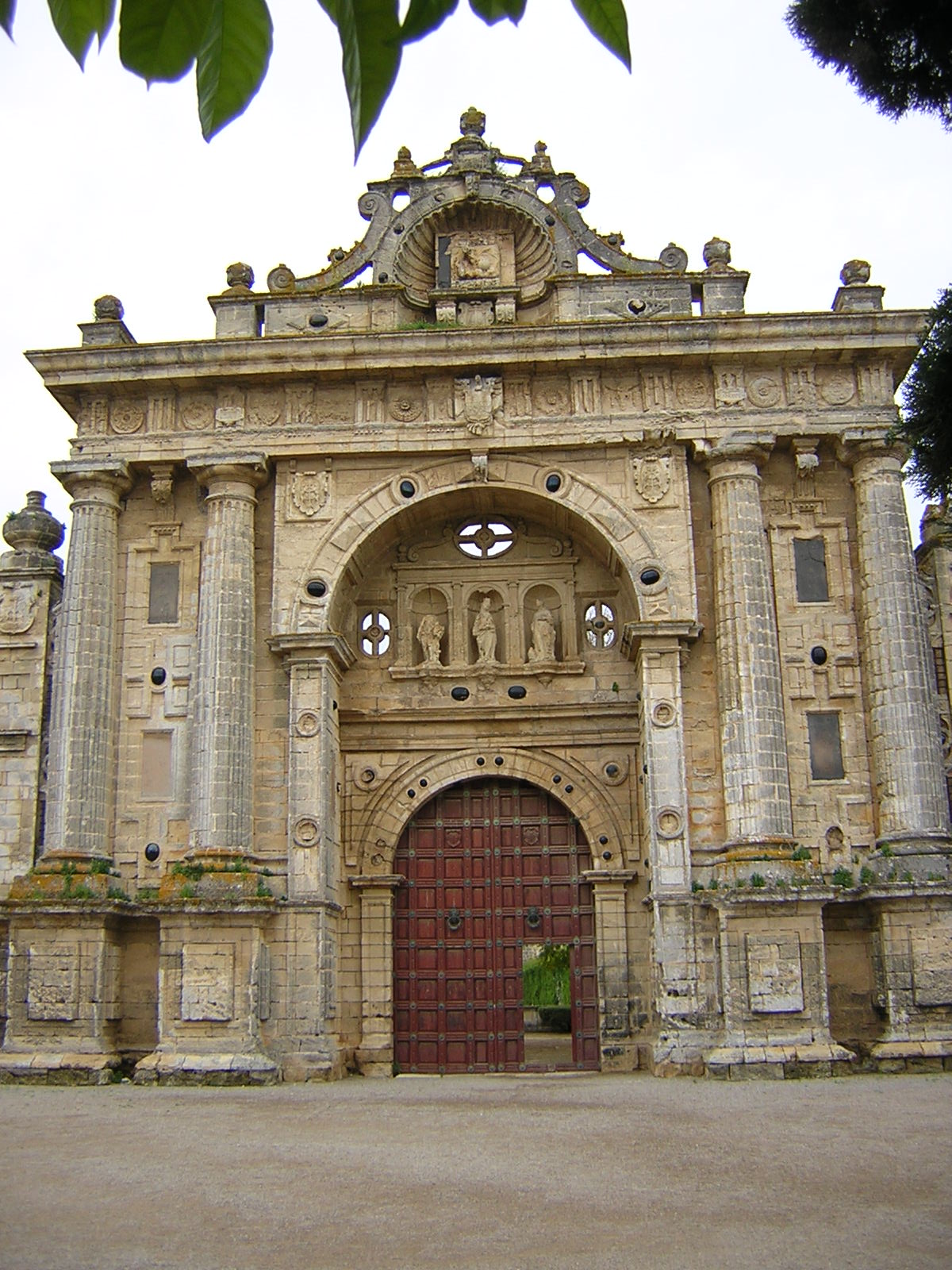
Renaissance entry of the Monastery.

The impulse behind the monastery dates back to Alvaro Obertos de Valeto, a knight of Genovese descent, appointed during the Reconquista by Alfonso X of Castile to defend the city shortly Alfonso had conquered it from Muslim rule in 1264. Lacking descendants, he left his fortune to establish a Carthusian monastery in the city. It was not until 1475 that this location near the Guadalete River was chosen, of special significance because in 1368 it has been the site of a victorious battle against invaders; the victory was attributed to intercession by the Virgin Mary, to whom a hermitage had been dedicated on the site, under the name Nuestra Señora de la Defensión ("Our Lady of the Defense"), which was adopted also for the monastery.

At the entrance of the enclosure stands a wide tetrastyle portico with a semicircular central span which holds, in a smaller span, two heavy sheets of wood studded with bronze. This work, begun in 1571 by Jerezan architect Andrés de Ribera, conforms to the purest canons of Andalusian classicism. Conceived as a great triumphal arch, it is composed in a sober manner and decorated with coats of arms, canopies, fretwork windows, and glazed ceramic hemispheres, constituting a superb example of Renaissance architecture.

At the beginning of the 17th century, with the original plan almost complete, new works were undertaken, such as the façade of the church, which was totally renovated in 1667 in a clearly Baroque style, following the plans of Brother Pedro del Piñar, who also placed atop the crests of the church and refectory niche sculptures by Francisco de Gálvez.

Like a veritable stone altarpiece, this façade is conceived in two orders superposed on Corinthian columns and curved and divided entablatures, supported on a base decorated with coats of arms and floral themes. The ornate decor of pilasters and friezes, the superposition of vases, and the airy top, with a much reduced third rank of imagery make this façade a singular element of the Andalucian Baroque.

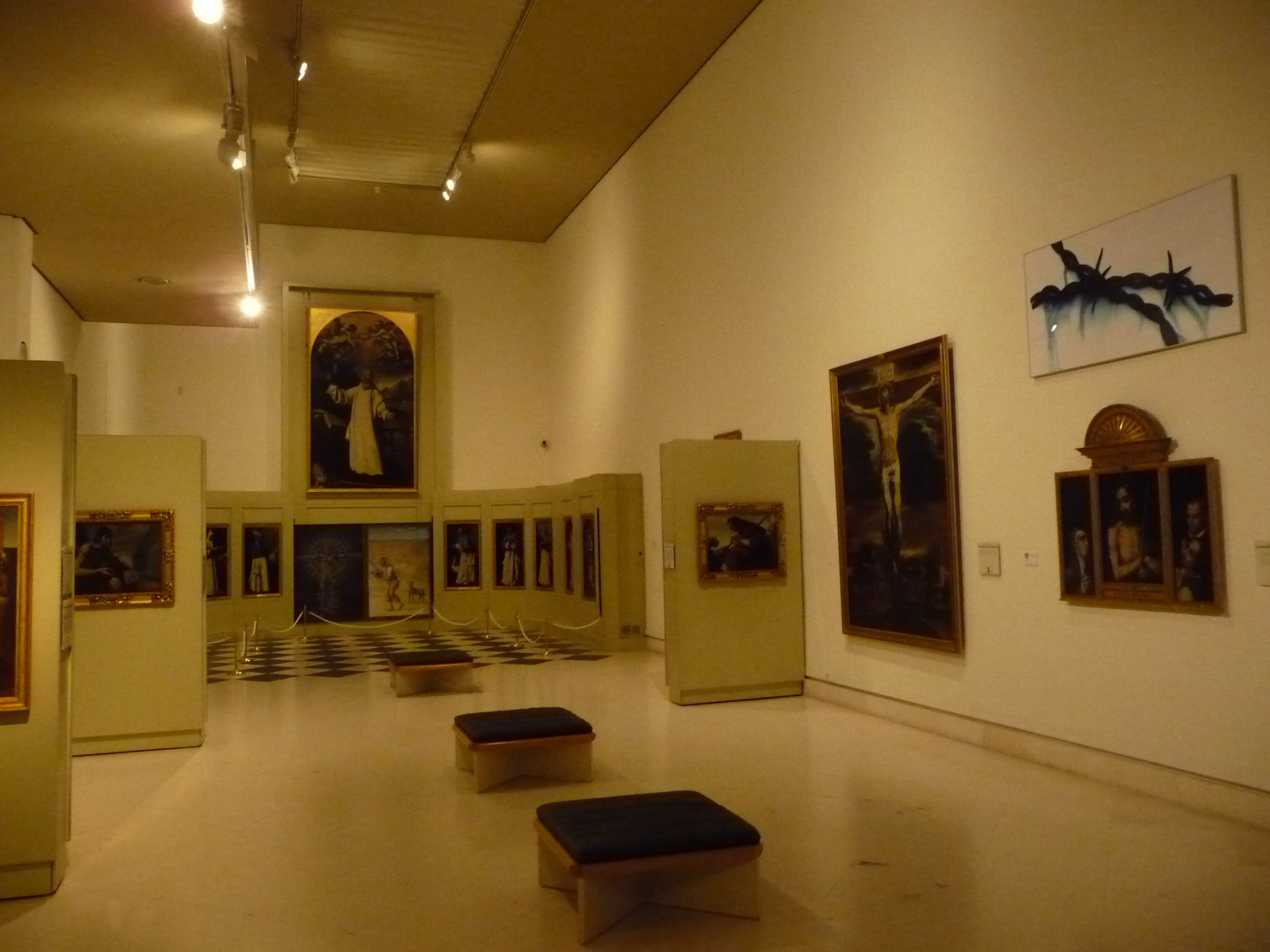
Paintings by Francisco Zurbarán in the Museo de Cádiz, originally from the monastery.

In the interior, of particular note are the choir stalls of the Coro de Padres, a work in carved wood, completed in 1550; the replacement of the old altarpiece in the Flemish style by Alejandro de Saavedra, José de Arce and Francisco de Zurbarán, as well as the group of paintings on wood by Zurbarán for the walls of the sanctuary, now mostly in the Museo de Cádiz.

In 1810, during the Peninsular War, the French invaders used the monastery as a barracks, and damaged or destroyed much of the complex that had been assembled over the prior three centuries. The monks were obliged to seek refuge in Cádiz, and when they returned, it was to a desolate, sacked monastery.

== Conservation and access ==
Restored and returned to its original use, and now in a good state of conservation, the monastery was designated a Monumento nacional in 1856, one of the first dozen or so places in Spain to be so designated. More recently, it has been designated an Historic-Artistic Monument.

It can be reached by the CA-2004, accessed from the Autovía A-381.

== See also ==
- List of Bien de Interés Cultural in the Province of Cádiz
