= The Rape of the Sabine Women (Luca Giordano) =

Series of paintings by Luca Giordano or his workshop

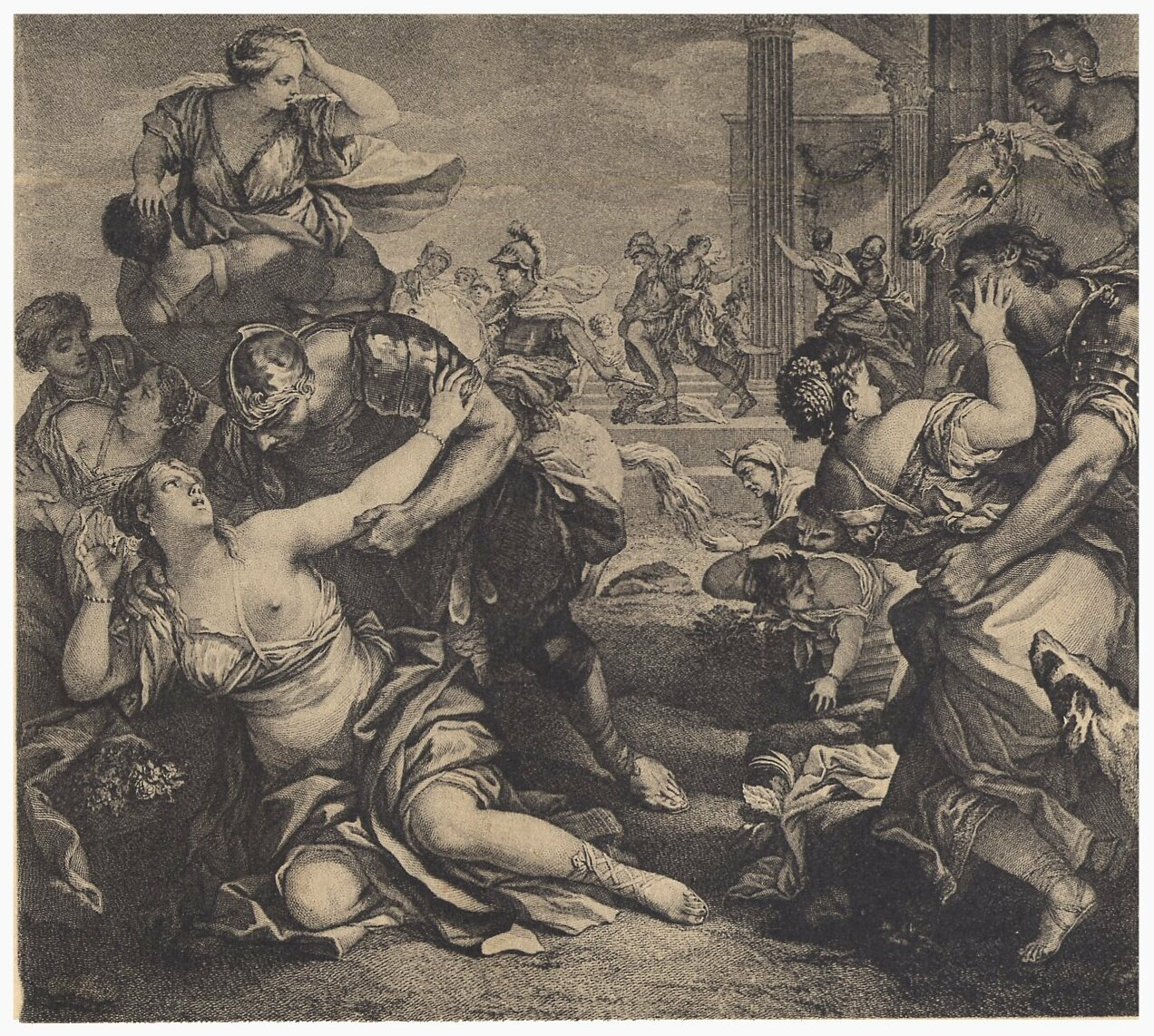
The Dresden picture was destroyed during the bombing of February 1945

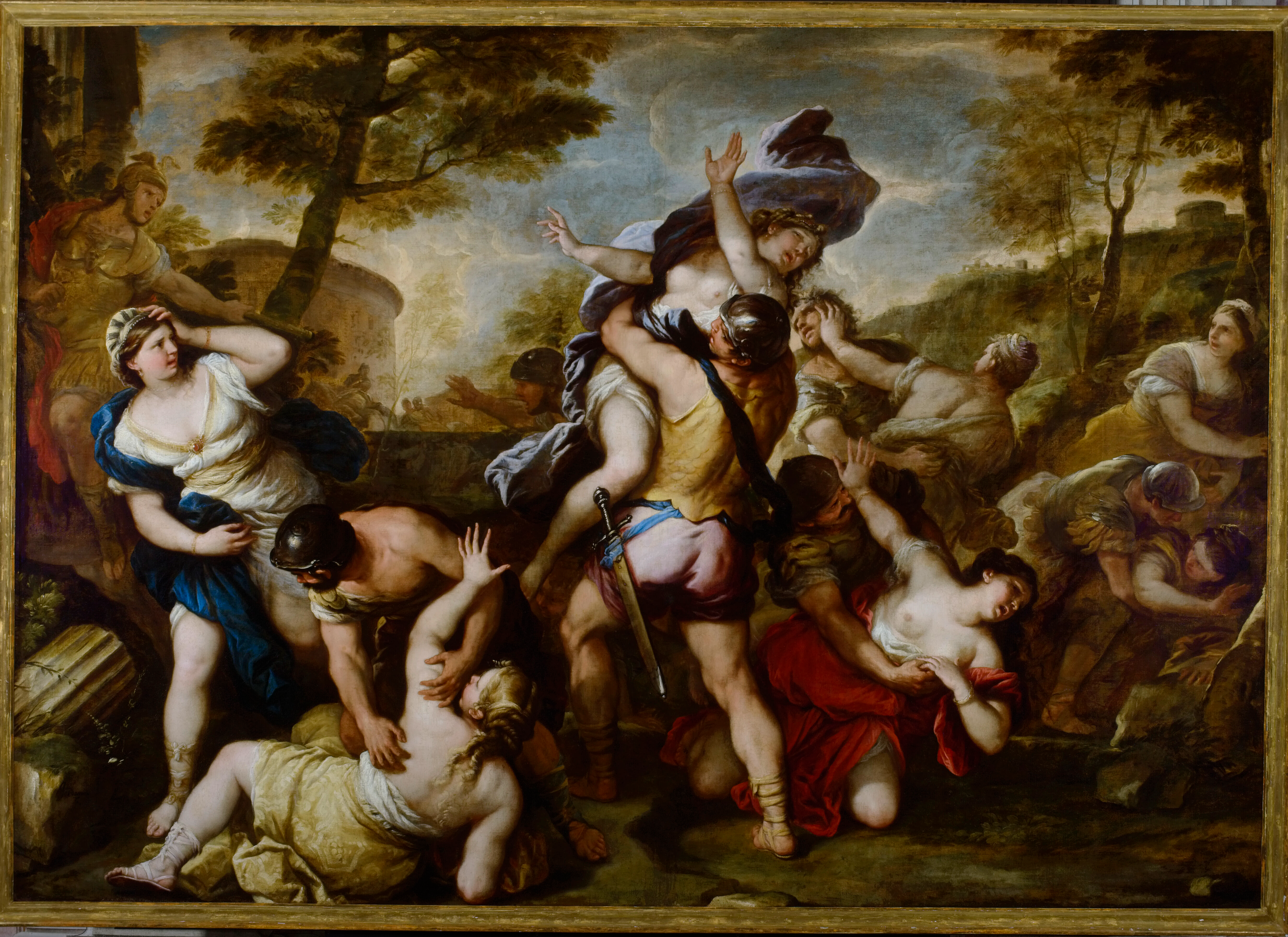
The picture in Genoa

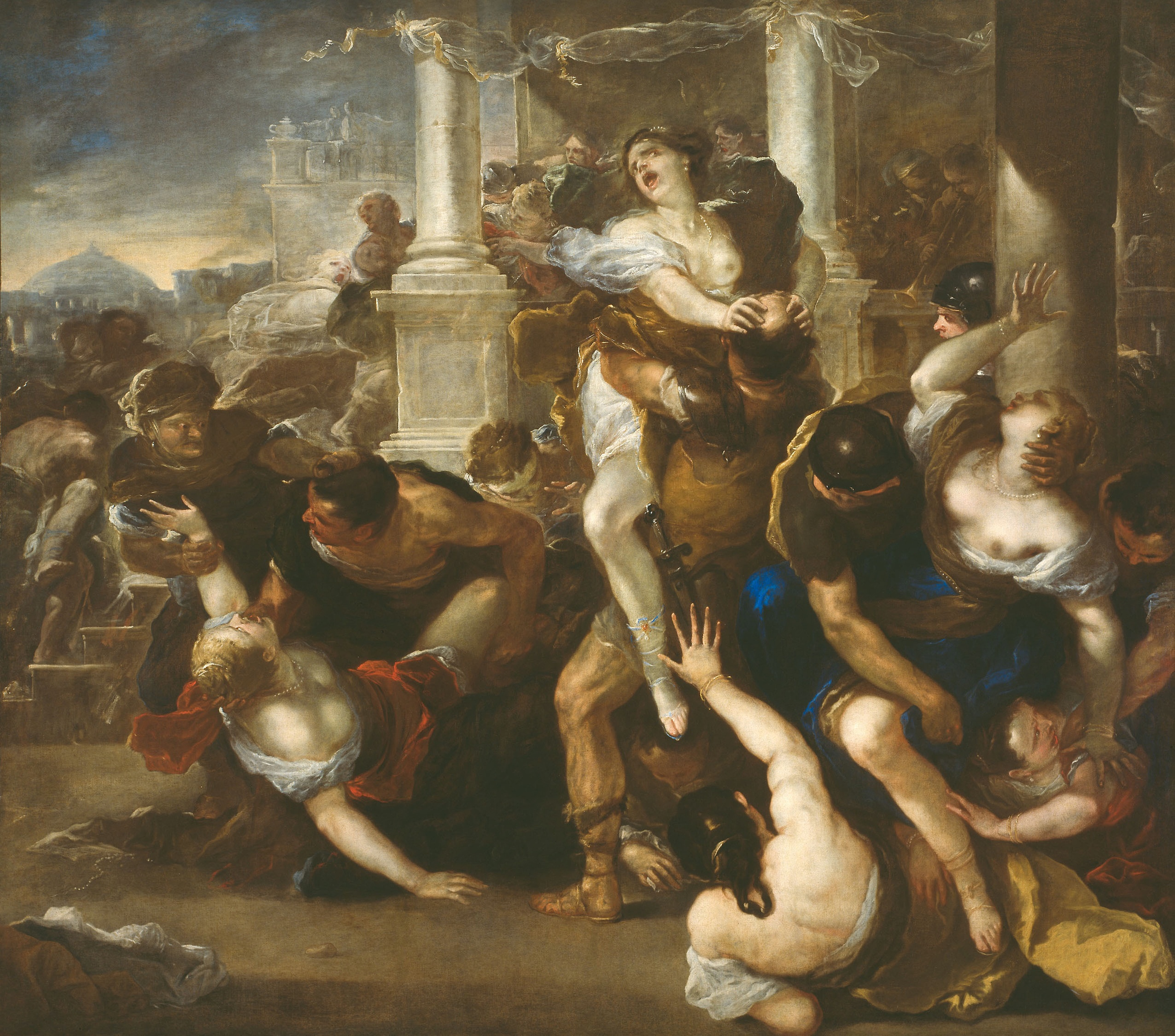
The picture in Chicago

The Rape of the Sabine Women may refer to at least eight paintings attributed to the Italian late-Baroque artist Luca Giordano or his workshop, all of which depict the legendary rape of the Sabine women. (Note: The story is told by Livy and Plutarch. Romulus, his people having been refused the right of connubium or legal marriage by the Sabines and the Latins, instituted games in honour of the god Census and invited his neighbours with their wives and children to the festival. When they were assembled, the Roman youths seized and carried off the virgins and made them their wives. This led to war, and both parties were nearly exhausted with the struggle when the Sabine women rushed in among the combatants and brought about a reconciliation between their husbands and their fathers.)

== Versions ==
- The Rape of the Sabine Women (German: Der Raub der Sabinerinnen), 7 ft 2 in x 8 ft. The Sabine women seized and borne away by the Romans. In the background, near a Corinthian temple, Romulus, mounted upon a horse, is directing the movement. Painted for Marie Louise d'Orléans, Queen of Spain; taken from Naples to Dresden. Engraved by R. Gaillard; R. Sourique; J. F. Beauvarlet; Réveil. Formerly in the Gemäldegalerie, Dresden.
- Rape of the Sabine Women (Italian: Ratto delle Sabine), 285 cm x 366 cm. This picture was formerly owned by Costantino Balbi, Doge of Genoa. It is now in the gallery of the Palazzo Spinola di Pellicceria, Genoa.
- The Abduction of the Sabine Women, 260 × 295 cm, 1675–80. Art Institute of Chicago.
- The Rape of the Sabine Women (Italian: Il ratto delle Sabine), 257.2 x 314.6 cm, c. 1672–74. National Gallery of Australia, Canberra.

== See also ==
- List of works by Luca Giordano

== Bibliography ==
- Champlin, John Denison Jr.; Perkins, Charles C., eds. (1887). Cyclopedia of Painters and Paintings. Vol. 4. New York: Charles Scribner's Sons. p. 96.
- Feinberg, Larry J. (1995). "Luca Giordano's 'Abduction of the Sabine Women'". Art Institute of Chicago Museum Studies. 21 (1): 39–77. doi:10.2307/4102812.
- Woermann, Karl (1908). Katalog der Königlichen Gemäldegalerie zu Dresden (in German). Dresden: Kunstanstalt Wilhelm Hoffmann. pp. 175–6, no. 485.
