= Mars and Venus with Cupid =

Painting by Luca Giordano

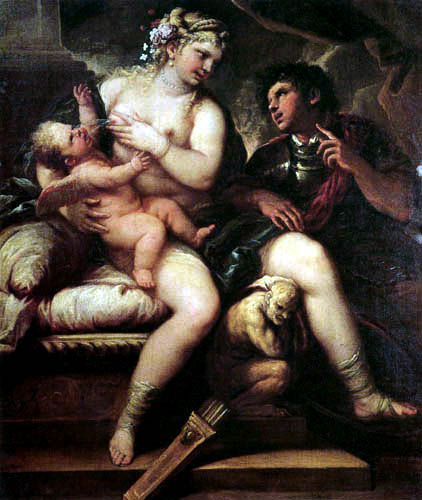
- Artist: Luca Giordano
- Year: 1663
- Medium: Oil on canvas
- Dimensions: 152 cm × 129 cm (60 in × 51 in)
- Location: National Museum of Capodimonte; Naples, Italy

Mars and Venus with Cupid is a 1663 oil-on-canvas painting by the Italian Baroque artist Luca Giordano, now in the National Museum of Capodimonte in Naples.

The painting, of discreet workmanship, does not constitute a work of primary importance by Giordano. The outlines of the figures in the painting are very approximate to the layout of the scene and the same is compressed and not perfectly balanced. In addition, the canvas has excessive points of light that disharmony the composition.

== See also ==
- List of works by Luca Giordano
