= Marriage of the Virgin (Giordano) =

Painting by Luca Giordano

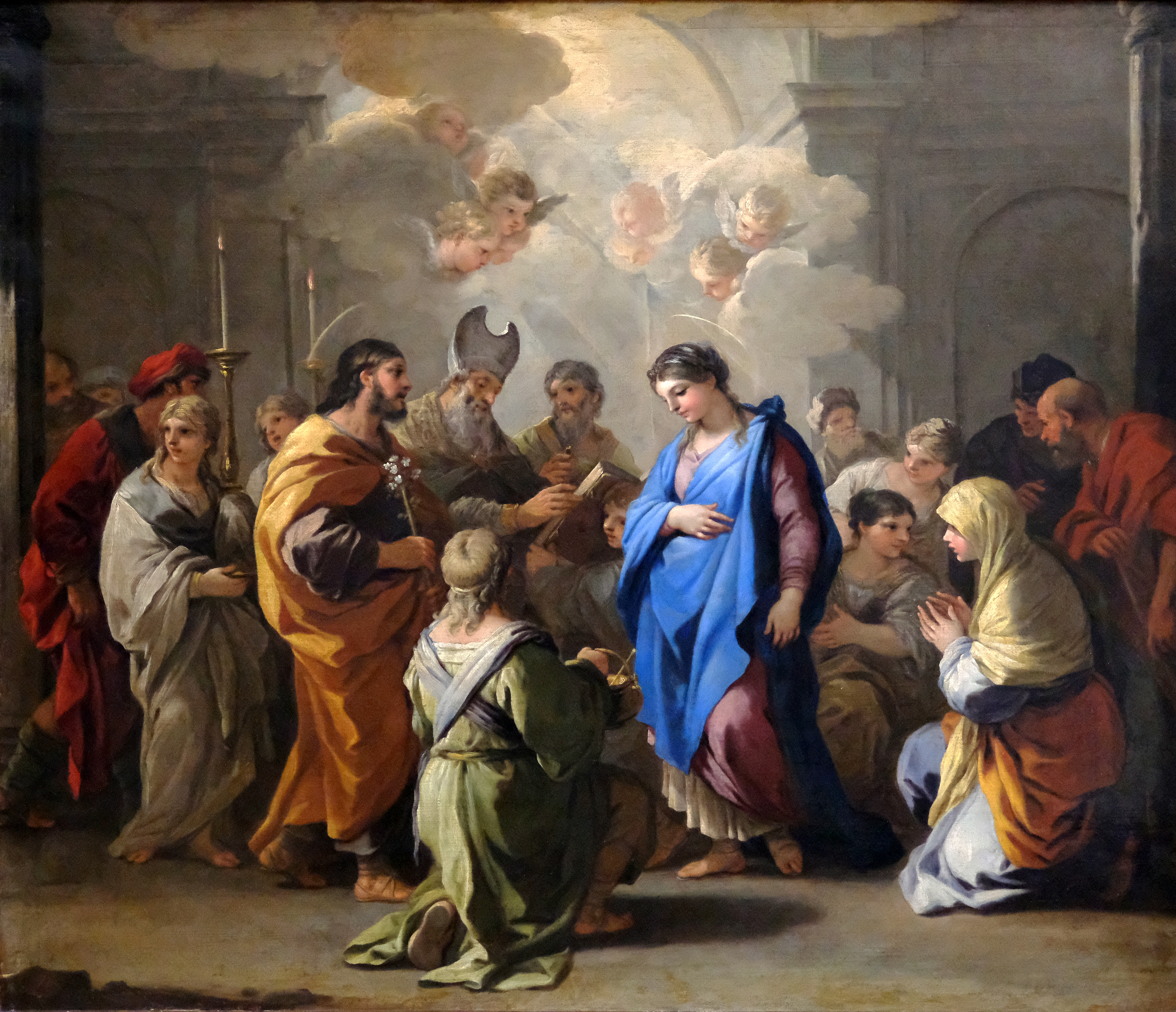
Marriage of the Virgin (c. 1688) by Luca Giordano

Marriage of the Virgin is an oil-on-canvas painting executed c. 1688 by the Italian artist Luca Giordano. It was probably part of a series of scenes from the Life of the Virgin created by the artist for the Palacio Real, a series which also included Adoration of the Shepherds. Both this work and Adoration are now in the Louvre in Paris.

== See also ==
- List of works by Luca Giordano
