= Saint Januarius Interceding =

Painting by Luca Giordano

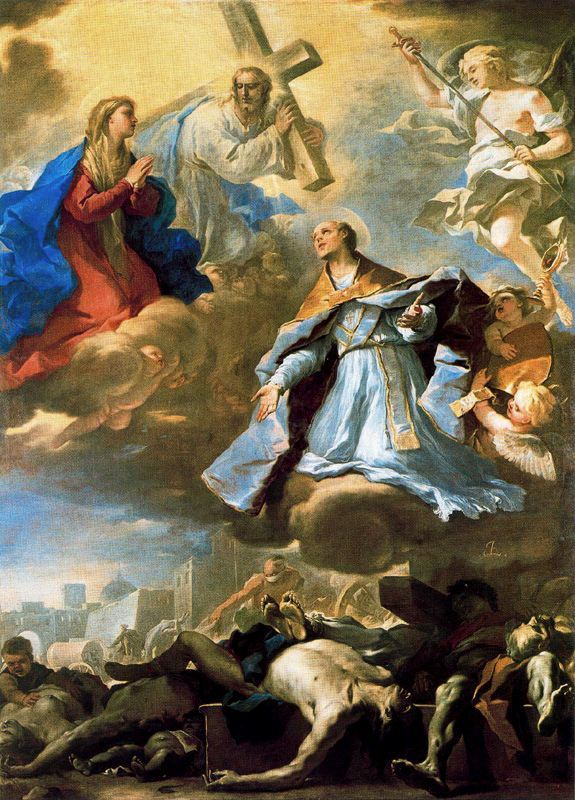
Saint Januarius Interceding (c. 1656) by Luca Giordano

Saint Januarius Interceding or Saint Januarius Interceding to the Virgin Mary, Christ and God the Father for Victims of the Plague is an oil-on-canvas painting by the Italian Baroque painter Luca Giordano. It is dated to around 1656 and is now in the National Museum of Capodimonte in Naples. It was commissioned by the Spanish viceroy in Naples, Gaspare de Bracamonte, as an ex voto for the ending of a plague in the city.

== See also ==
- List of works by Luca Giordano

== Sources ==
- Luca Giordano, 1634–1705, Editrice Electa (2001) (Italian) ISBN 88-435-8579-7
- Vincenzo Pacelli, Luca Giordano inediti e considerazioni, Ediart 2007 (Italian)
