= Sarnelli =

Sarnelli is a surname of Italian origin. Notable people with the surname include:

- Januarius Maria Sarnelli, Jesuit and an early companion of S. Alphonsus Liguori
- Vincent Sarnelli (born 1962), French boxer
- Vincenzo Maria Sarnelli (1835–1898), Italian Catholic bishop
