= Aspren =

Italian Roman Catholic saint

Saint Aspren
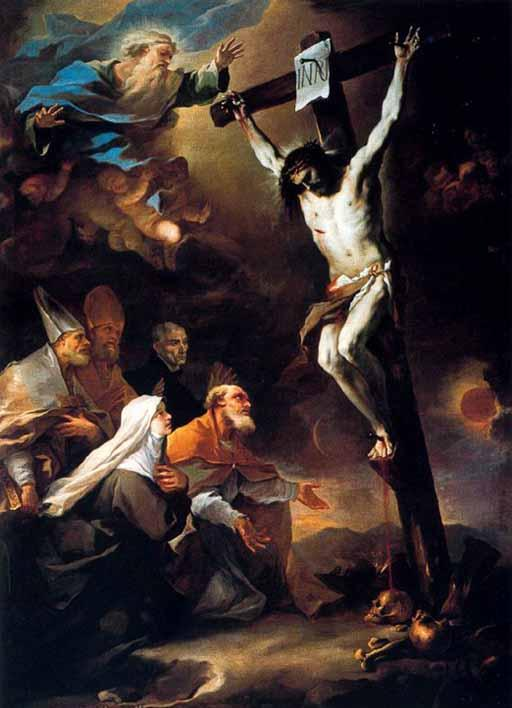
- Luca Giordano, The Patron Saints of Naples (Baculus, Euphebius, Francis Borgia, Aspren (kneeling), and Candida the Elder) adoring the Crucifix, 17th century. Palazzo Reale, Naples.

Bishop
- Born: 1st century Naples
- Died: 2nd century Naples
- Venerated in: Roman Catholic Church
- Feast: August 3
- Patronage: Naples; invoked against migraine

Aspren or Asprenas (Italian: Sant'Asprenato, Sant'Aspreno, Sant'Aspremo) was a 1st-century Christian saint and venerated as the first Bishop of Naples.

== Life ==
Aspren lived at the end of the 1st century and in the early 2nd century, as confirmed by archaeological studies regarding the early Neapolitan Church as well as the fact that "Aspren" was a common name during the days of the Roman Republic and the early years of the Roman Empire and afterwards fell into disuse.

The Marble Calendar of Naples (Calendario Marmoreo di Napoli) attests to Aspren's existence and the fact that he lived during the reigns of Trajan and Hadrian; Aspren's episcopate is stated as lasting twenty-three years.

== Legend ==
Nothing is known of his life, but an ancient legend holds that Saint Peter, on his way to Rome, stopped at Naples and converted an old woman (identified as Candida the Elder) after he cured her of an illness. Numerous other converts to Christianity were made during this time in Naples, including Aspren, who was converted either by Peter or Candida.

The legend tells that Aspren was sick, and was cured by St. Peter, but this cannot be confirmed. Peter consecrated Aspren as bishop of Naples and asked him to construct the oratory of Santa Maria del Principio, which would form the basis for the basilica of Santa Restituta; San Pietro ad Aram was also said to have been built during this time.

== Veneration ==
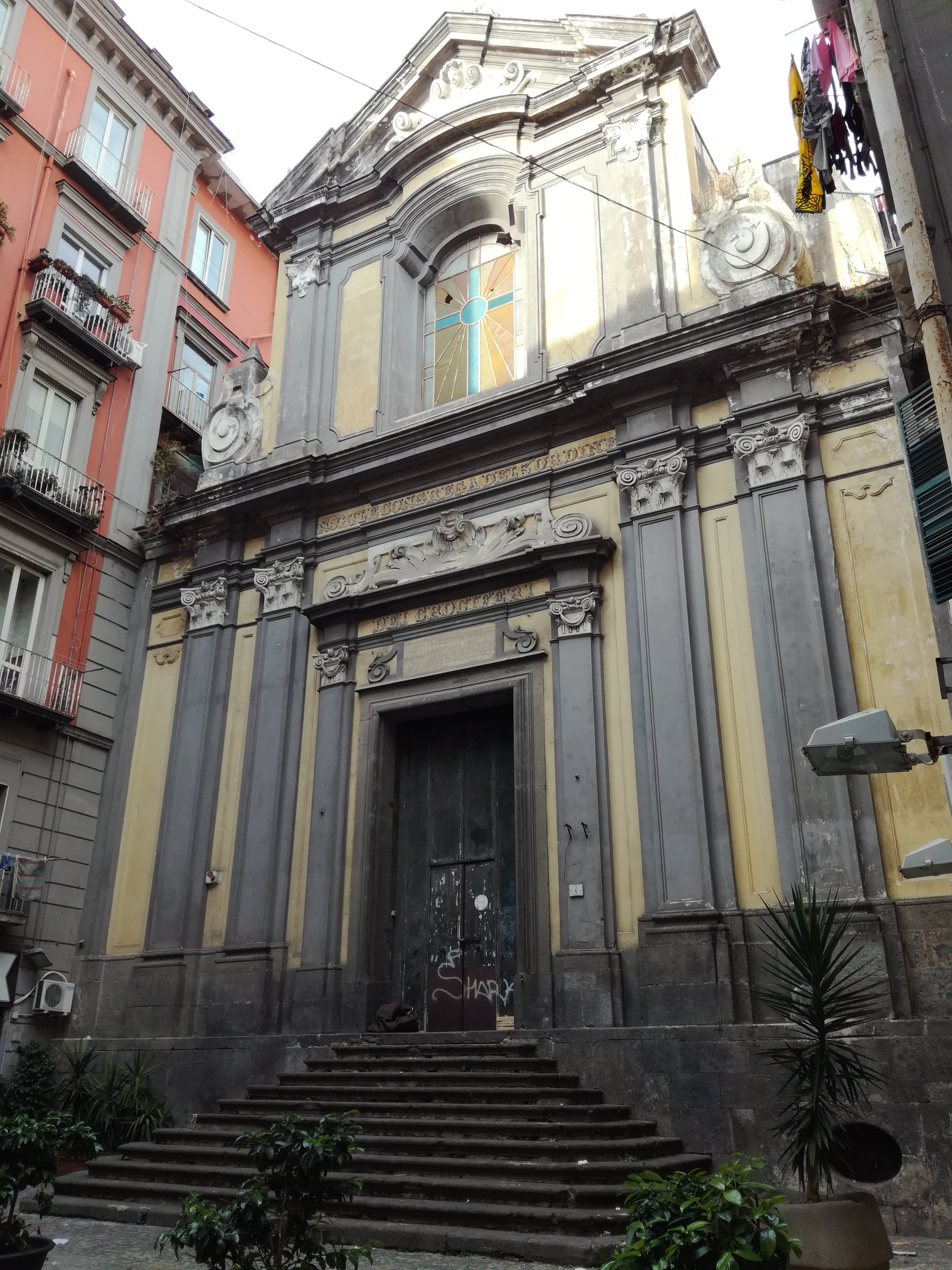
Church of Sant'Aspreno ai Crociferi, Naples.

After Aspren's death, numerous miracles were attributed to him, and his sepulcher rested in the oratory of Santa Maria del Principio, although some scholars state that his sepulcher was located in the Catacombs of San Gennaro, where images of the first fourteen Neapolitan bishops can be found. In any case, John IV, Bishop of Naples translated Aspren's relics to the basilica of Santa Restituta, in the chapel dedicated to Aspren. Aspren was named the second (in 1673) of the large group of more than 50 patron saints of Naples (Saint Januarius is the first).

A silver bust of Aspreno is found in Naples Cathedral. In the city two churches were dedicated to him as well as the chapel of San Aspreno in Naples Cathedral. Bernardo Tesauro would paint frescoes in this chapel.

== See also ==
Aspirin (a pain killer commonly used to reduce discomfort from headaches and migraines)
