= Sant'Aspreno ai Crociferi =

Catholic church in San Carlo all'Arena, Naples

Coordinates: 40°51′23″N 14°15′22″E

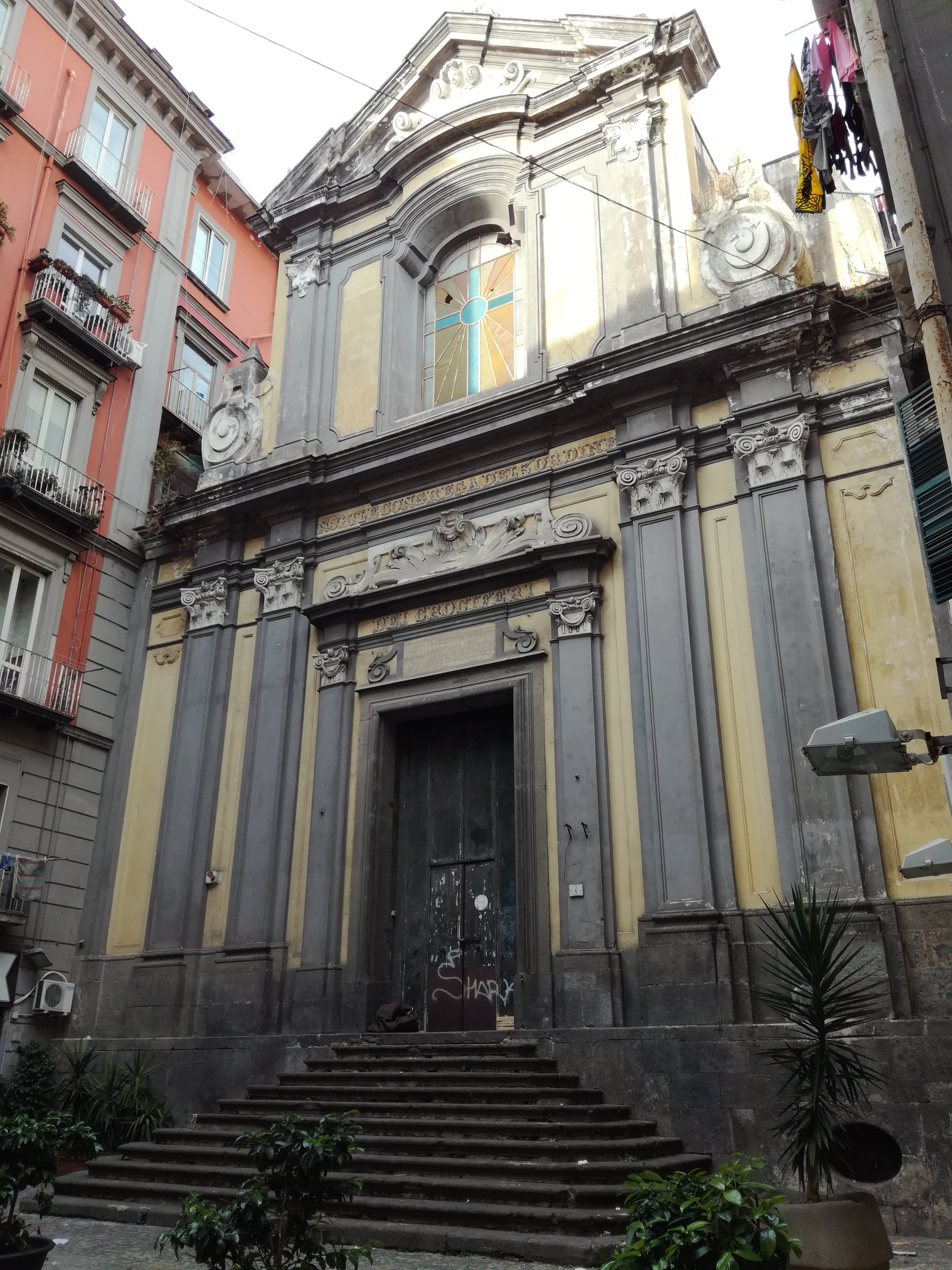
Church of Sant'Aspreno ai Crociferi, Naples.

Sant'Aspreno ai Crociferi (lit. "Saint Aspren of the Crociferi") is a church in the neighborhood of San Carlo all'Arena, Naples, southern Italy. It is dedicated to Saint Aspren.

Ferdinando Sanfelice designed a star-shaped plan for the church, although it was later built to a more ordinary design by engineer Luca Vecchione.

== See also ==
- Churches in Naples
