= Euphebius =

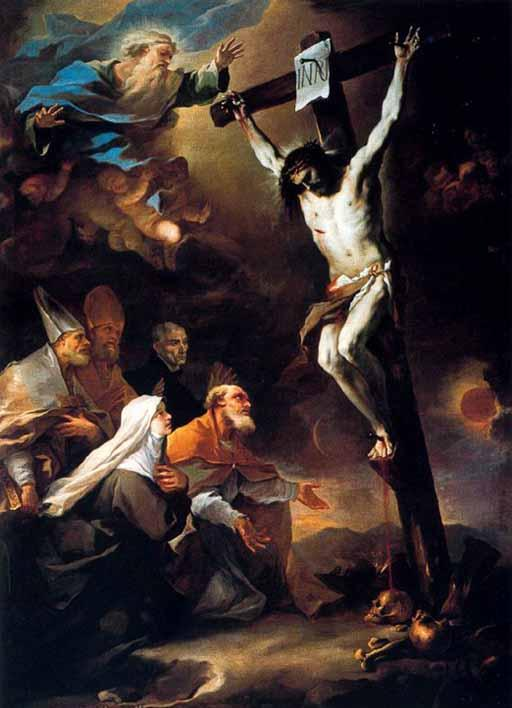
- Luca Giordano, The Patron Saints of Naples (Baculus, Euphebius, Francis Borgia, Aspren (kneeling), and Candida the Elder) adoring the Crucifix, 17th century. Palazzo Reale, Naples.

Bishop
- Venerated in: Roman Catholic Church
- Patronage: Naples

Saint Euphebius (Ephebus, Euphemus, Efrimus) is venerated as a patron saint and bishop of Naples. Ferdinando Ughelli writes that the date of Euphebius' episcopate cannot be determined with certainty. There is no biography of Euphebius’ life. Paulus Regius and Baronius theorized that Euphebius died in 713 AD, but Joannes Diaconus considers Euphebius the eighth bishop of Naples, succeeding St. Eustasius (Eustathius), which would have his episcopate occur sometime in the 2nd century. He is commemorated in the Roman Martyrology on May 23.
