= Museum of Cádiz =

Coordinates: 36°32′5.77″N 6°17′47″W

- Museo de Cádiz
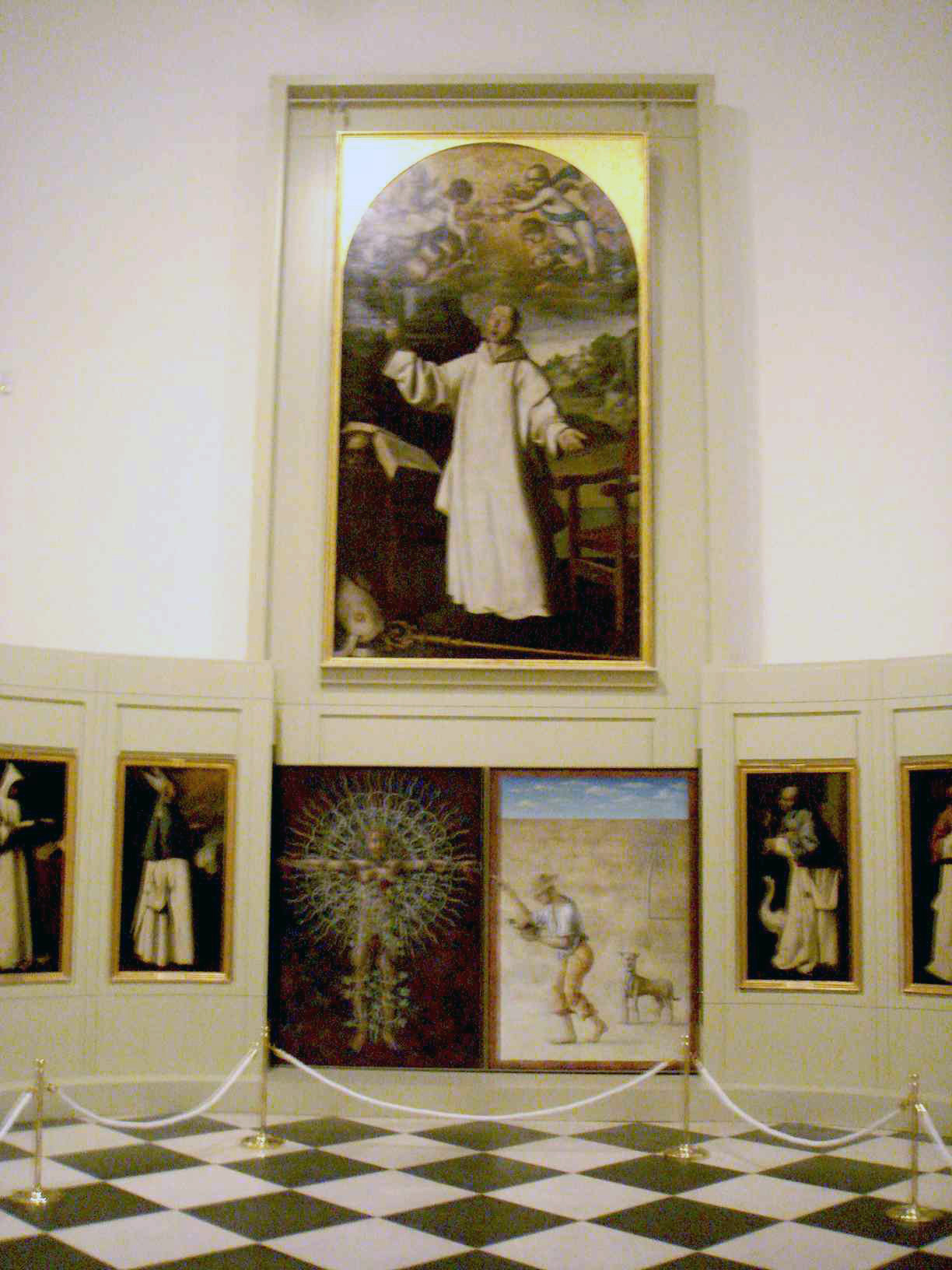
- Zurbarán room
- Established: 1835 (Museum of Fine Arts); 1877 (Museum of Archaeology); 1970 (merger)
- Location: Plaza de Mina s/n Cádiz; Spain
- Type: Fine art, Contemporary art, Archaeology, Ethnography
- Key holdings: Zurbarán, Murillo, Rubens
- Website: www.museosdeandalucia.es/web/museodecadiz

The Museum of Cadiz is a museum located in Cádiz, Spain. It was founded in 1970 after the merger of the Provincial Museum of Fine Arts with the Provincial Museum of Archaeology. It is on three floors, archaeology on the ground floor, art on the first, and puppets on the second floor. Entry is free for citizens of the European Union.

The origin of the museum came in 1835, when art was confiscated from a monastery, including paintings by Zurbarán taken from the Charterhouse of Jerez de la Frontera. Other paintings included the works of Murillo and Rubens. The collection grew during the century, due to the city's Academy of Fine Arts which practised romanticism and neoclassicism. In 1877, after a Phoenician sarcophagus was found in the city's shipyard, the Archaeological Museum was founded. However, it was not until 1970 that the two institutes, despite sharing the same building, were merged. From 1980, the architect Javier Feduchi planned a reform of the building in three phases, of which two have been completed.

In addition to the 19th-century pieces, the art museum has received contemporary art from the Junta de Andalucía. Its archaeological section has also received donations, particularly of coins. Despite a range of prehistoric findings from Southern Andalusia, due to local history, it has a lack of artefacts from the Middle Ages. The "Tía Norica" set of puppets, used at the Carnival of Cádiz, was acquired by the State.

== See also ==
- List of museums in Spain
