= Candida the Elder =

Christian martyr (died c. AD 78)

Saint Candida the Elder
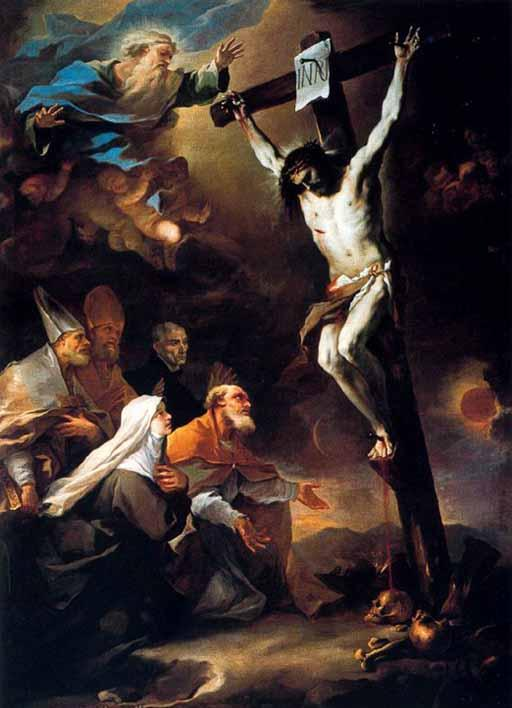
- Luca Giordano, The Patron Saints of Naples (Baculus, Euphebius, Francis Borgia, Aspren, and Candida the Elder (kneeling)) adoring the Crucifix, 17th century. Palazzo Reale, Naples.

Virgin
- Born: Naples
- Died: c. AD 78; Naples, Italy, Roman Empire
- Venerated in: Eastern Orthodox Church; Roman Catholic Church
- Feast: 4 September
- Patronage: Naples, Dining Clubs

Candida the Elder (Italian: Candida la Vecchia) (died c. AD 78) was a legendary early Christian saint and resident of Naples, Italy, who is venerated as a saint in the Eastern Orthodox Church and Roman Catholic Church, with a feast day on 4 September. She is one of the patron saints of Naples.

== Biography ==
According to her legend, Candida was an elderly woman who hospitably welcomed Peter the Apostle, when he was passing through Naples on his way to Rome. The woman was cured of an illness by Peter and converted to Christianity. She was baptized by Peter and later converted Aspren, the first bishop of Naples, to Christianity.

Candida Xu, an influential Chinese woman from the 17th century, was named after her

== Existence ==
Basil Watkins says she probably never existed. Her name has been deleted from the revised Roman Martyrology.
