= Baculus of Sorrento =

Italian Roman Catholic saint

Saint Baculus of Sorrento
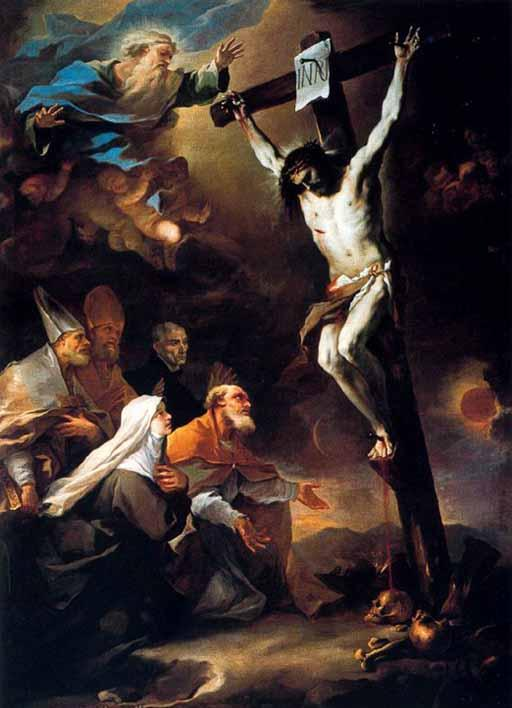
- Luca Giordano, The Patron Saints of Naples (Baculus, Euphebius, Francis Borgia, Aspren (kneeling), and Candida the Elder) adoring the Crucifix, 17th century. Palazzo Reale, Naples.

Bishop
- Died: ~7th century
- Venerated in: Roman Catholic Church
- Major shrine: church of Santi Felice e Baccolo in Sorrento
- Feast: August 27
- Patronage: Naples; Sorrento

Saint Baculus of Sorrento (Italian: San Bacolo di Sorrento, San Baccolo di Sorrento) is venerated as a bishop of Sorrento.

The Life of Saint Antoninus, Abbot of Sorrento, composed in the 9th century or sometime after, mentions some patron saints of Sorrento: the bishops Renatus, Athanasius, and Baculus. The Life includes a description of the saints obtained from painting hanging at the time in the cathedral of Sorrento.

The time when Baculus is supposed to have been bishop of the city is uncertain. Ferdinando Ughelli, basing his findings on a manuscript dating from after the 12th century found in Sorrento Cathedral, believed that Baculus’ episcopate occurred in the 7th century. The Bollandists believed Baculus lived around 660 AD. Francesco Lanzoni, however, writes that “the Vita Sancti Baculi, in the section that concerns the episcopate of its hero, does not contain any chronological detail concerning the same. Nothing, therefore, can prevent us from believing that he may have lived in the fourth or fifth centuries.”

== Veneration ==
The traditional date of Baculus’ death was August 27, which became his feast day, celebrated by Sorrento. Baculus’ relics were initially buried in the wall of the city, but were then translated to the church of San Felice. From the 15th to 18th centuries, there existed a chapel dedicated to Baculus.

The church of Santi Felice e Baccolo in Sorrento, also known as the Chiesa del Rosario, is partly dedicated to him. His relics rest in this church.
