= Churches in Naples =

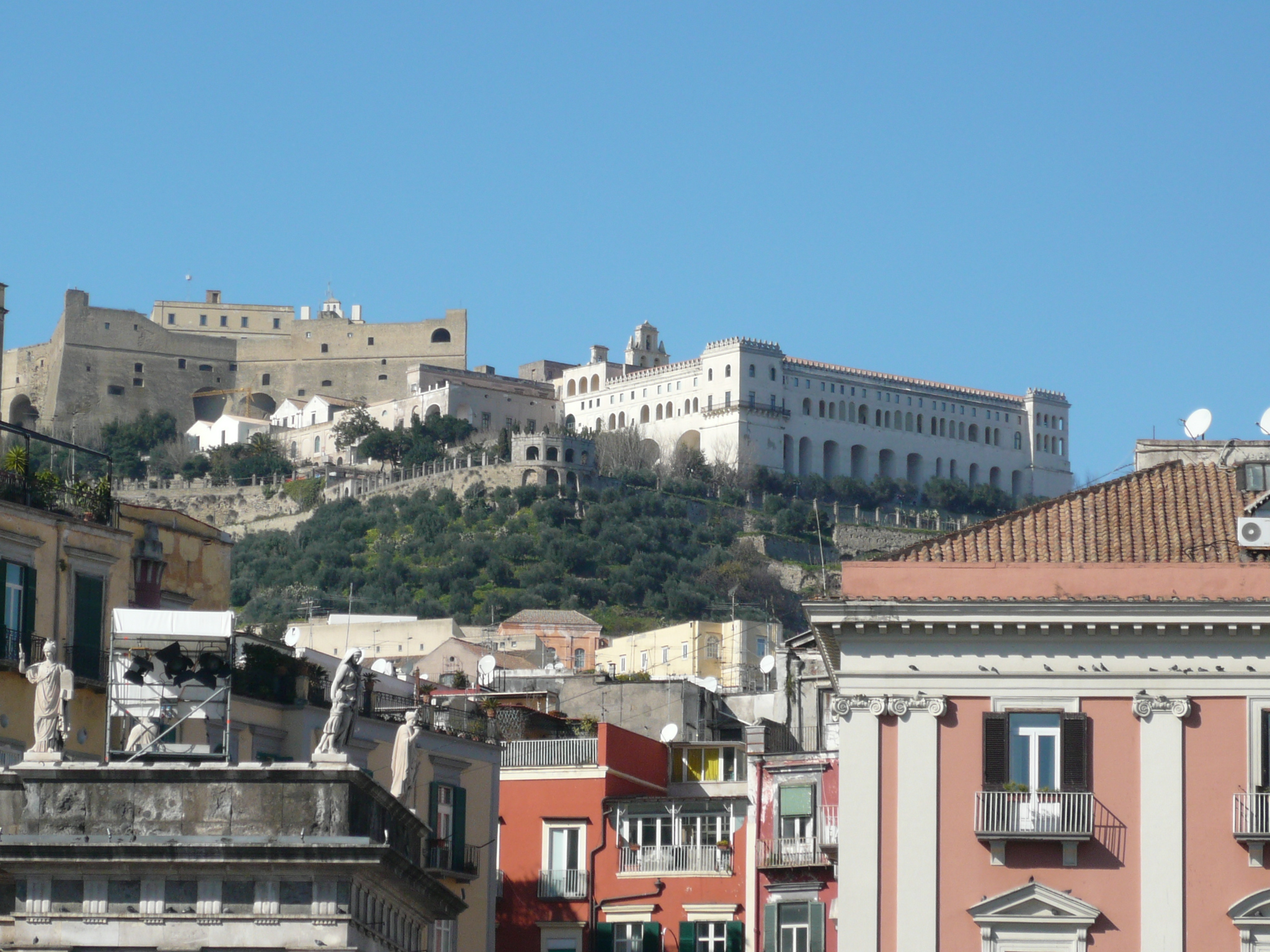
Charterhouse of St. Martin

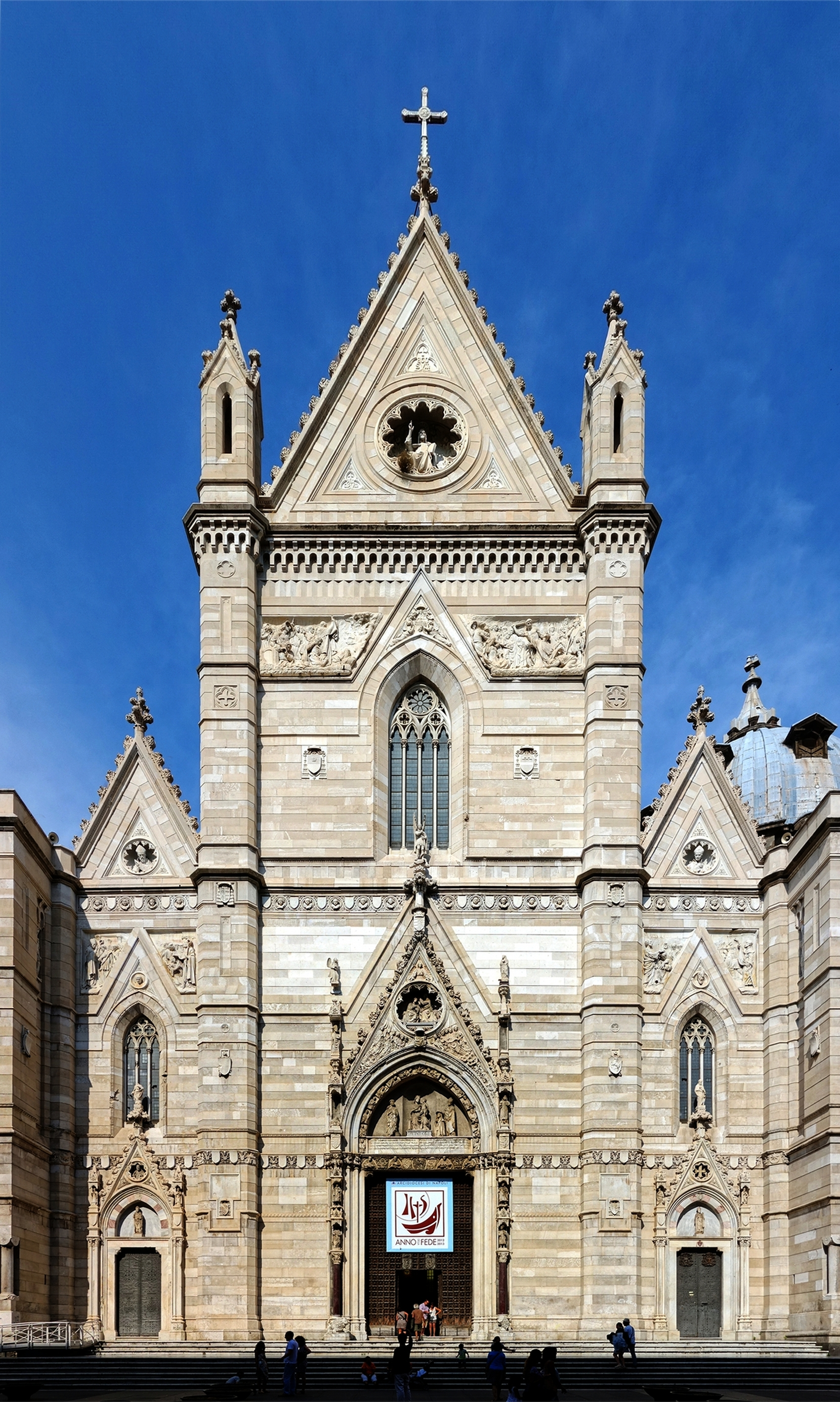
Naples Cathedral

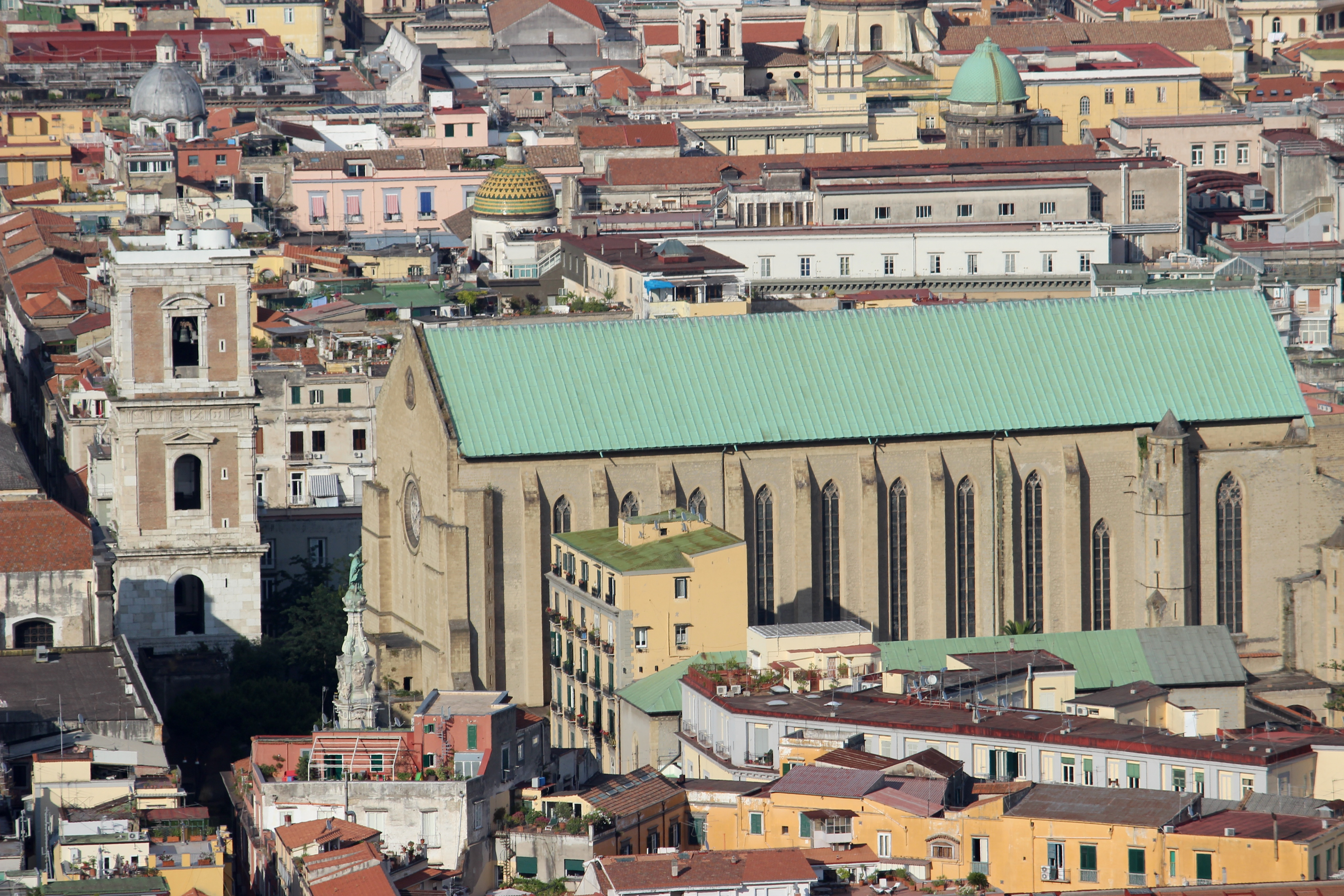
Santa Chiara

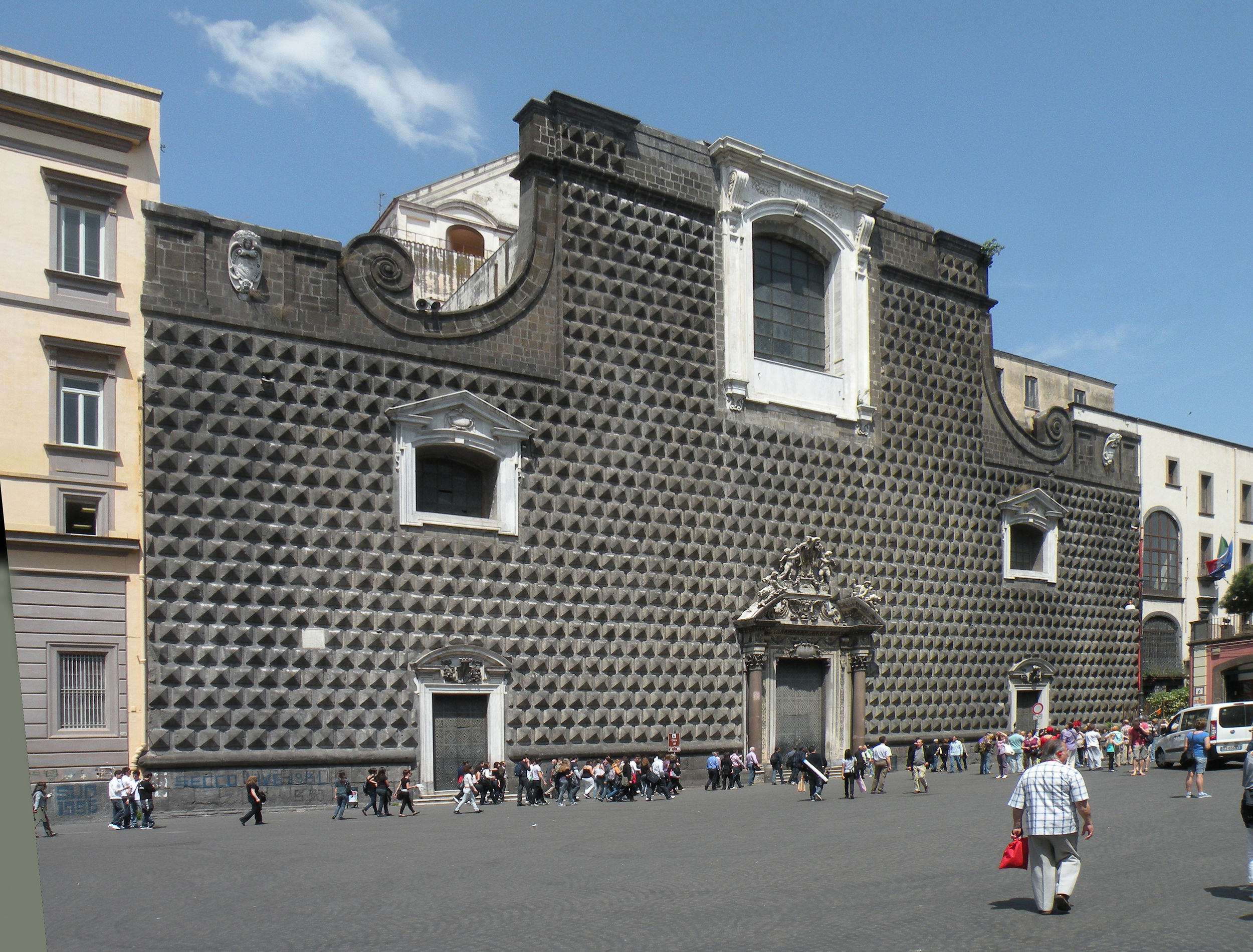
New Jesus

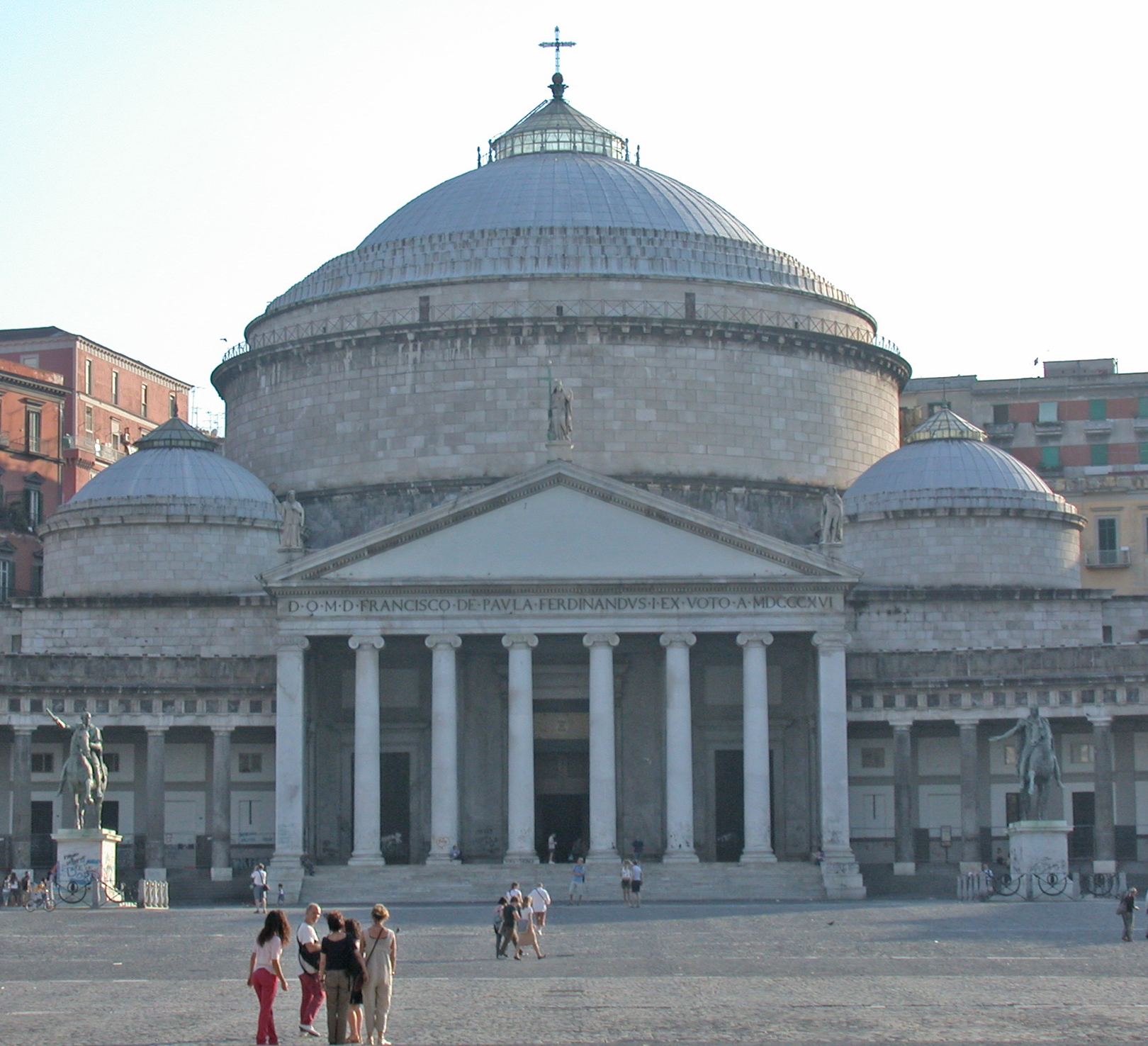
San Francesco di Paola

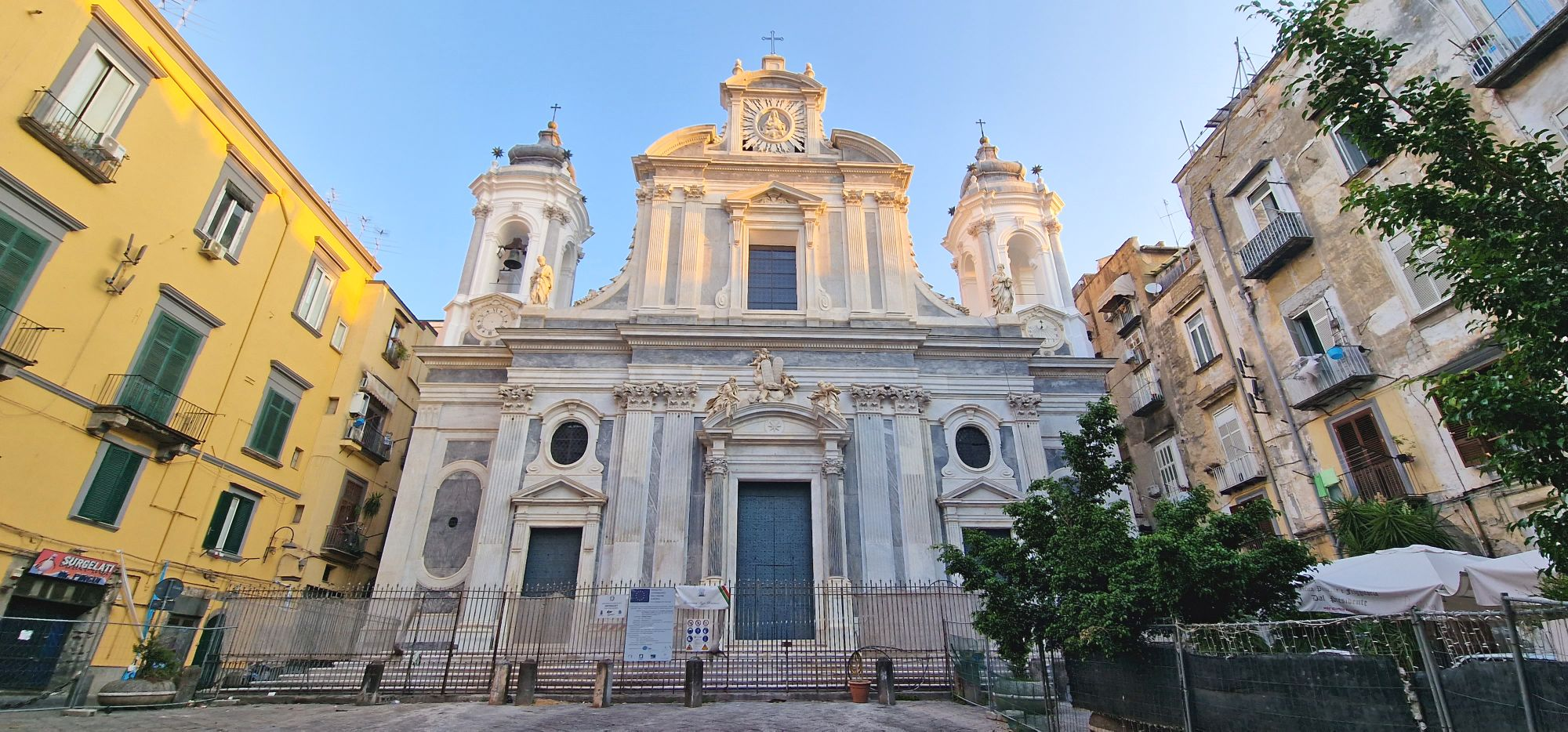
Girolamini

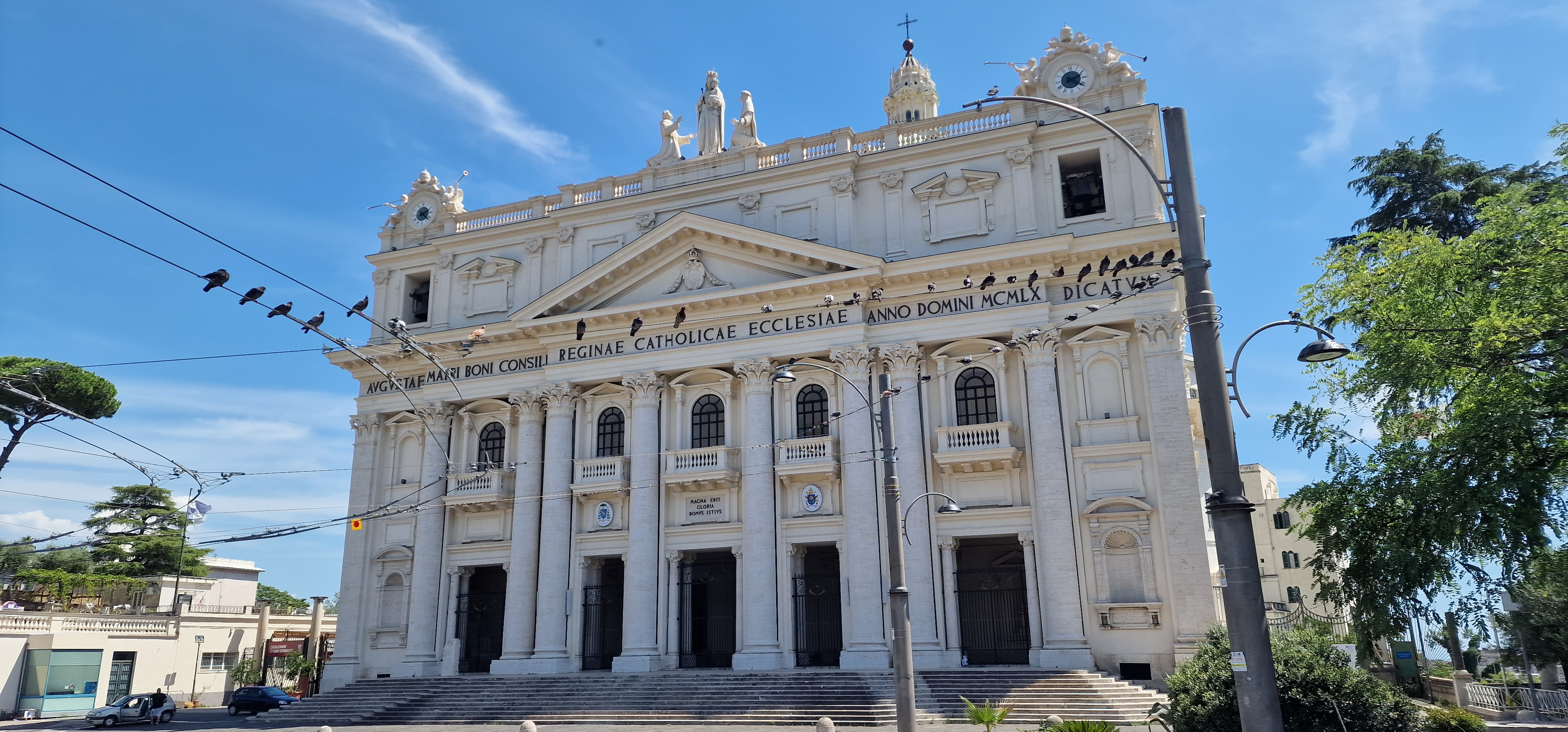
Little St. Peter

Christianity and religion in general has always been an important part of the social and cultural life of Naples. It is the seat of the Archdiocese of Naples, and the Catholic faith is highly important to the people of Naples and there are hundreds of historic churches in the city (about five hundred, 1000 in total). The Cathedral of Naples is the most important place of worship in the city, each year on September 19 it hosts the Miracle of Saint Januarius, the city's patron saint. Thousands of Neapolitans flock to see the dried blood of Januarius being said to turn to liquid when brought close to relics said to be of his body: this is one of the most important traditions for Neapolitans.

== Churches and their styles ==
The cathedral of San Gennaro (Saint Januarius), was built under the patronage of Charles of Anjou in 1272, on the site of the ancient Stefania cathedral of the 8th century, and completed in 1341, the work of Nicolò Pisano, Maglione, and Masuccio. The church is in Gothic style with three naves; the façade, modified by the restoration of 1788, has been brought again to its original style; its principal door is a work of Babuccio Piferno (1407), while its chapel of San Restituta is said to date from the time of Constantine. The fourteen pilasters are adorned with busts of famous archbishops of Naples. In the crypt, which was built by Malvito by order of Archbishop Carafa, is venerated the body of St. Januarius, taken there from Montevergine in 1479. Of the lateral chapels, that of the Treasure is the most notable; it is there that the head of St. Januarius and the ampullæ that contain the martyr's blood are preserved. The cathedral contains the superb sepulchres of Innocent IV and of a Cardinal Minutoli. the second, a work of Girolamo d'Auria; also, valuable 13th-century frescos of Santafede, Vincenzo Forti, Luca Giordano, and others, and paintings by Giovanni di Nola, Franco, Perugino, and Domenichino. Among other churches are the church of Sant Agostino alla Zecca, which has a pulpit of the 15th century, sculptures by Vincent d'Angelo and Giovanni da Nola, and a painting by Diana (the Communion of St. Augustine).

The church of the Santi Apostoli was completed in 1608; it houses works by Giordano, Marco da Siena, Bonomini, and Dolci, the tabernacle of the high altar being the work of Caugiano.

The church of San Domenico Maggiore, dating from 1255, is rich in paintings, mosaics, and sepulchres, and in the ancient monastery connected with this church is the cell of San Thomas Aquinas.

The church of Donna Regina, built by Mary of Hungary, in 1300, and rebuilt by the Theatine Guarino in 1670, contains valuable paintings and frescos, and also, the tomb of the foundress.

The church of San Filippo Neri, in baroque style, by Dionisio di Bartolomeo (1592), contains statues by Sammartino, and both the church and the sacristy have very valuable paintings by Luca Giordano, Camillo Guerra, Guido Reni, Polidoro da Caravaggio, Spagnoletto and others.

The church of San Francesco di Paola (1817) is a Neoclassic imitation of the Pantheon, with two wings that have porticos, is adorned with paintings of the 19th century.

The Basilica of San Giacomo degli Spagnoli (1540) is decorated in a Renaissance style.

The church of San Giovanni a Carbonara (1343) contains the mausoleums of King Ladislaus of Naples, and of the constable Sergianni Caracciolo, and paintings by famous artists.

The church of Santa Barbara, a work of Giuliano da Maiano, has a beautiful bas-relief of the Madonna with angels over the principal entrance, and another fine bas-relief within the edifice; adjacent to the church is the cell inhabited by Saint Francis of Paola.

The church of Santa Chiara (1310), restored in 1752, contains the mausoleums of Robert the Wise and of other personages, and also, paintings by Lanfranco, Giotto, and other artists.

The church of Santa Maria del Carmine, built in the 13th century, and restored in 1769, contains the tomb of Conradin, and a statue (1847) of the tragic young medieval king designed by the Neoclassic sculptor Thorvaldsen and commissioned by then crown-prince, Maximilian II of Bavaria.

The church of St. Mary of Piedigrotta, where each year, about September, popular feasts are celebrated.

The church of Santa Anna of the Lombards of Monte Oliveto (1411) contains many works of art, and also the tomb of the architect Carlo Fontana.

The church of San Pietro ad Aram, so called because it contains an altar upon which St. Peter is said to have celebrated Mass. The church of Santa Maria del Parto, built by the poet Sannazaro, contains the mausoleum of its founder, a work of Fra Giovanni Montorsoli

The church of San Paolo Maggiore, built on the ruins of the ancient temple of Castor and Pollux, after the plans of the Theatin Francesco Grimaldi; the church of SS. Severinus and Sosius, which is very ancient, was restored in 1490 and in 1609. While painting the vault of this temple, the artist Correnzio, falling from the scaffolding, was killed and he lies buried at the place of his fall; other artists have also adorned this church with fine works.

The church of the Most Holy Trinity, or the new Gesù Nuovo, an ancient palace converted into a church by the Jesuit Provedo (1584). Mention should be made, however, of the catacombs, near the church of San Gennaro degli Poveri, famous in the 2nd century, and of the new cemetery, rich in artistic monuments, among which are the Pietà by Calì in the chapel, and the statue of Religion by Tito Angelini.

== Some churches in Naples ==
- Certosa di San Martino
- Naples Cathedral
- San Francesco di Paola
- Gesù Nuovo
- Girolamini
- San Domenico Maggiore
- Sant'Angelo a Segno
- Santa Chiara
- San Paolo Maggiore
- Santa Maria della Sanità, Naples
- Santa Maria del Carmine
- Sant'Agostino alla Zecca
- Madre del Buon Consiglio
- Santa Maria Donna Regina Nuova
- San Lorenzo Maggiore
- Santa Maria Donna Regina Vecchia
- Santa Caterina a Formiello
- Santissima Annunziata Maggiore
- San Gregorio Armeno
- San Giovanni a Carbonara
- Santa Maria La Nova
- Sant'Anna dei Lombardi
- Sant'Eligio Maggiore
- Santa Restituta
- Sansevero Chapel
- San Pietro a Maiella
- San Gennaro extra Moenia
- San Ferdinando
- Pio Monte della Misericordia
- Santa Maria di Montesanto
- Sant'Antonio Abate
- Santa Caterina a Chiaia
- Santissima Trinità alla Cesarea
- Spires of Naples
- San Pietro Martire
- Hermitage of Camaldoli
- Archbishop's Palace
- Fontanelle cemetery
- Santa Maria Avvocata
- San Giuseppe Maggiore dei Falegnami
