= Poggioreale, Naples =

Coordinates: 40°52′07″N 14°18′05″E

Poggioreale
- Quarter of Naples
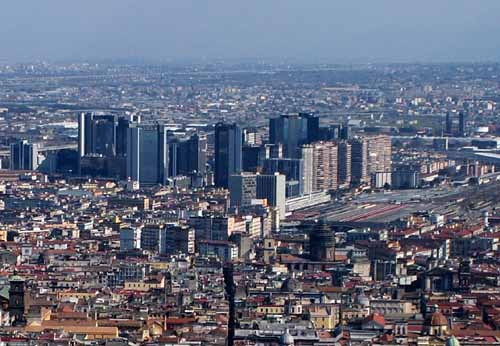
- Centro direzionale di Napoli

- Location of Poggioreale within Naples
- Country: Italy
- Region: Campania
- City: Naples
- Municipalità: 4th

Area
  - Total: 4.45 km^{2} (1.72 sq mi)

Population
  - Total: 25,237
  - Density: 5,670/km^{2} (14,700/sq mi)
- Postal code: 80143

Poggioreale (Neapolitan: Puceriale) is a neighbourhood of Naples, Italy. It is at the extreme east end of the downtown Naples and includes the central train station, Centro Direzionale (Business Center), Poggioreale Prison, and the industrial area to the east.

== History ==
The tuff blocks used in the 6th c. BC Greek age city wall of Neapolis were extracted from a vast quarry located in Poggioreale; it was identified by chance in 1987 following subsidence under the Pianto cemetery below the square of the church of Santa Maria del Pianto. The quarry has horizontal ridges corresponding to the height of the blocks and, surprisingly, the characteristic alphabetical marks of the ancient quarrymen. From the quarry the blocks were transported to the city along the straight line of via Nuova Poggioreale to via Casanova to enter Naples from the ancient gate where Castel Capuano is now located.

Originally built on the ruins of Alfonso II's Villa Poggio Reale, the area was heavily bombed in World War II and certain parts of the area still show the scars of bombing. Master Planning began in 1982 and construction completed in 1995 of the Naples Centro Direzionale (Civic Center) — to help rehabilitate the area from its generally decayed condition.

== Geography ==
Poggioreale is situated in eastern suburb of the city. It forms, with Zona Industriale, San Lorenzo and Vicaria, the Fourth Municipality of Naples.

== Main sights ==
- Centro Direzionale
- Cemetery of Poggioreale
- Church of Santa Maria del Pinato
- San Giuseppe Maggiore dei Falegnami
