= Zona Industriale =

Coordinates: 40°50′50″N 14°17′01″E

- Quarter of Naples
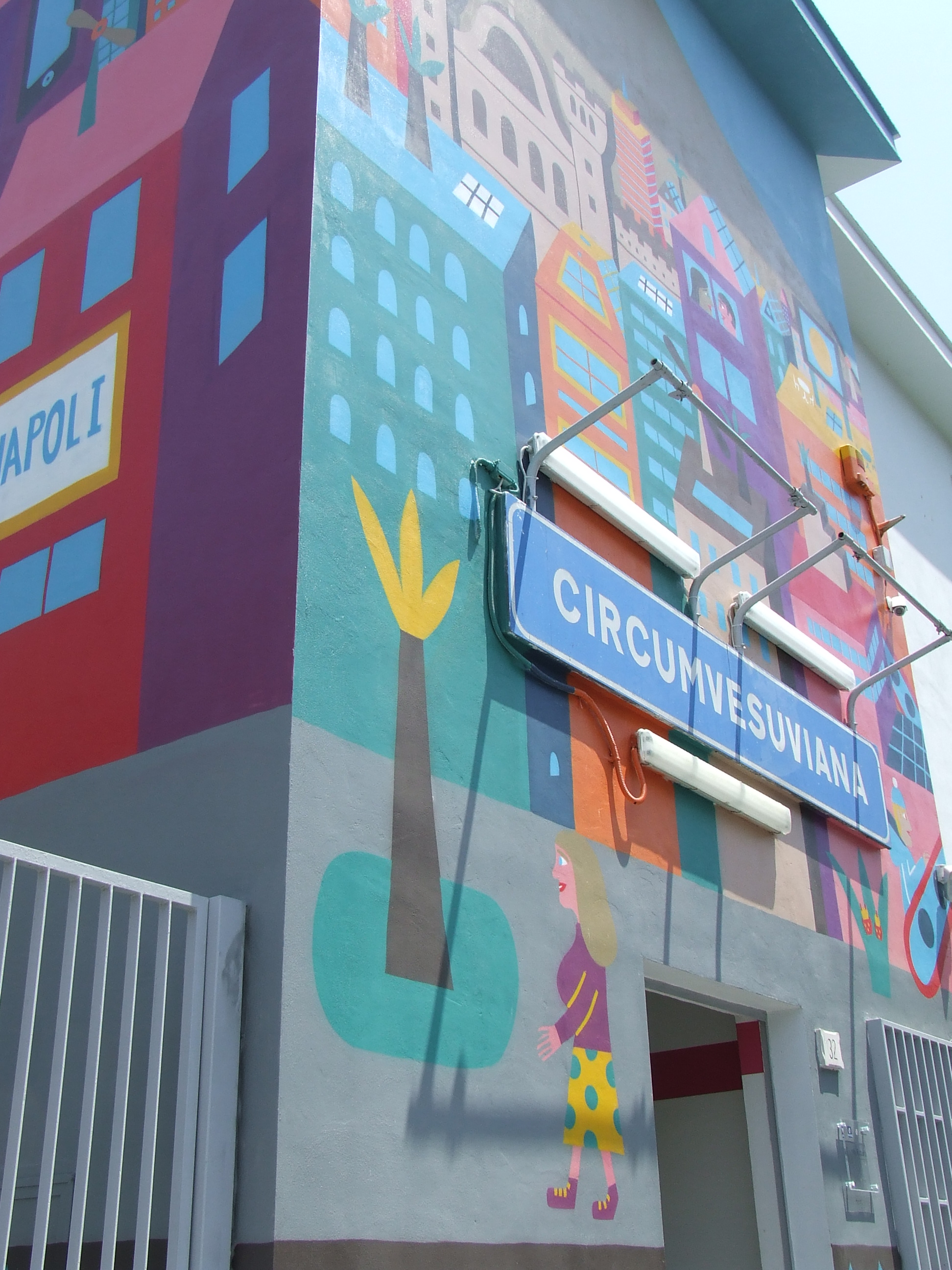
- Via Gianturco railway station, Circumvesuviana

- Location of Zona Industriale within Naples
- Country: Italy
- Region: Campania
- City: Naples
- Municipalità: 4th

Area
  - Total: 2.68 km^{2} (1.03 sq mi)

Population
  - Total: 6,241
  - Density: 2,330/km^{2} (6,030/sq mi)
- Postal code: 80142

Zona Industriale (in Italian literary Industrial Zone, referring to the industrial park) is a quarter of Naples, Italy. With Poggioreale, San Lorenzo, and Vicaria it forms the Fourth Municipality of the city.

== Geography ==
Situated in the southeastern area of the city, close to the coast, Zona Industriale borders with the quarters of Porto, Mercato, San Lorenzo, Vicaria, Poggioreale, Barra and San Giovanni a Teduccio. It covers an area of 2.68 km^{2} and its population is of 6,082. Most of the area is covered by factories.
