= Vicaria =

Coordinates: 40°51′38″N 14°16′23″E

- Quarter of Naples
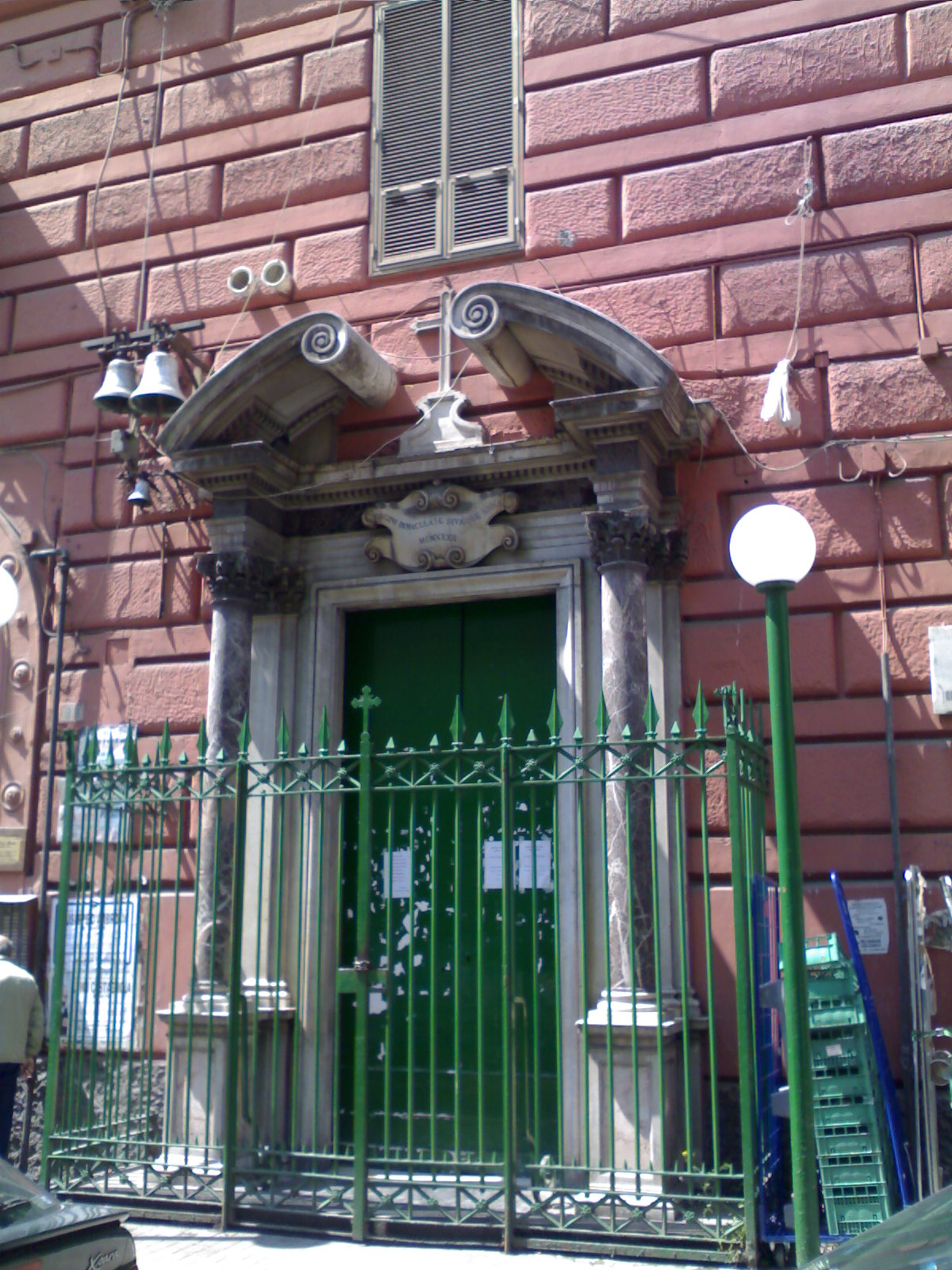
- Detail of the west front of Sant'Anna al Vasto

- Location of Vicaria within Naples
- Country: Italy
- Region: Campania
- City: Naples
- Municipalità: 4th

Area
  - Total: 0.72 km^{2} (0.28 sq mi)

Population
  - Total: 15,062
  - Density: 21,000/km^{2} (54,000/sq mi)
- Postal code: 80143

Vicaria (Italian: residence of the Viceroy), often known as Il Vasto, is one of the 30 quartieri of Naples, southern Italy, lying immediately to the east of the historical city centre (Centro storico).

It borders the districts of Poggioreale, Zona Industriale and San Lorenzo, which together with Vicaria make up the 4th municipality of the city. It also borders the district of San Carlo all'Arena, in the 3rd municipality.

Vicaria comprises a relatively small area, 0.72 km^{2}. It had a population in 2009 of 16,369 inhabitants.

It takes its name from the eastern section of the Via dei Tribunali (the "street of the courthouses"), in the neighbourhood of San Lorenzo, once known as the "Via della Vicaria", since the Vicaria (the still-prominent Palazzo Ricca at the east end of the street) housed the main tribunal under the Spanish viceroys.
