= Poggioreale Prison =

Prison in Naples, Italy

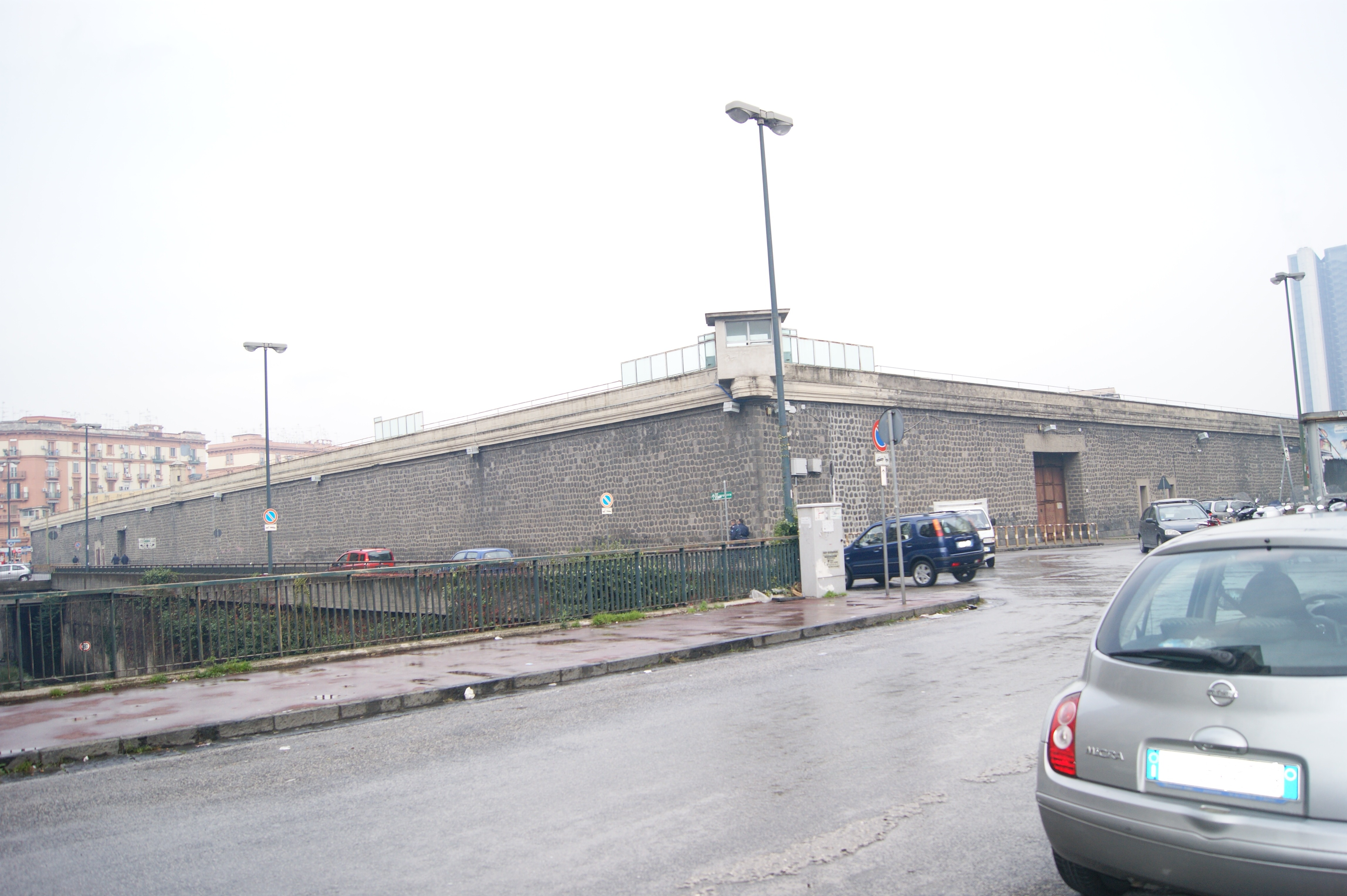
- Exterior of the prison in 2012
- Interactive map of Poggioreale Prison
- Location: Via Nuova Poggioreale, 167 Naples, Campania Italy; 40°51′36″N 14°16′44″E
- Status: Operational
- Capacity: 1,571
- Population: 2,101
- Opened: 1914
- Managed by: Ministry of Justice

Poggioreale Prison (Italian: Carcere di Poggioreale) officially the "Giuseppe Salvia" Circondarial House of Naples Poggioreale (Italian: Casa circondariale di Napoli Poggioreale "Giuseppe Salvia"), is the main prison of Naples, Italy, located in the homonymous district, Poggioreale, at via Nuova Poggioreale, 167. It is one of the largest and most populous penal institutions in Italy and is commonly described as one of the most overcrowded in Europe.

Poggioreale Prison, which was named after deputy director Giuseppe Salvia, murdered by the Nuova Camorra Organizzata, was built in 1914. Design of the judicial prison began in 1905 to relieve overcrowding at the prisons then in use: the Vicaria (Castel Capuano), the Carmine Prison, and Forte di Vigliena.

== History ==
=== Construction and early years ===
Work on the judicial prison began in 1905, in response to the insufficiency and overcrowding of the penal institutions then active in Naples: the Vicaria prison (formerly Castel Capuano), the Carmine prison, and Forte di Vigliena. The contract was initially awarded to the firm "Cacciapuoti fu Salvatore", which was expected to complete the work within four years; construction was instead finished in 1914.

During the First World War some pavilions were occupied by military troops, with a temporary change of use and adaptation works; the occupation caused damage to the building, which later required restoration work. Only in 1919 did the Ministry of the Interior order the transfer of inmates from the Carmine judicial prison. In 1921, following the escape of two inmates, it became necessary to provide the institute with an external surveillance service, and the entire guard corps stationed at the Carmine was transferred to Poggioreale.

The institute had been designed to hold around 700 inmates in strictly single "tunnel-type" cells measuring two by two by two metres, but it was later converted into a facility with long dormitories to house a larger number of prisoners. In the first half of the 1940s and in the immediate postwar period, the inmate population exceeded 7,000, partly due to the presence of numerous political prisoners and black-market traders.

=== The postwar period, overcrowding, and riots ===
Over the course of the twentieth century, the institute was repeatedly the scene of riots and protests linked to sanitary conditions and overcrowding. In July 1968 a riot broke out over a prolonged lack of water and lasted a day and a night: more than sixty custodial officers, carabinieri, and inmates were injured, much of the facility was set alight and devastated, and around eight hundred prisoners were subsequently transferred to other institutes. Among the most notorious was the 1972 riot, when some inmates complained about insects and bedbugs in the cells: the protest escalated into the devastation of the pavilions, the tearing down of gates, and the looting of storerooms, leaving a nineteen-year-old inmate dead from a gunshot and others injured.

=== The Camorra years ===
The most difficult years coincided with the feud between Nuova Camorra Organizzata and Nuova Famiglia between the late 1970s and the mid-1980s, when the feuding between clans also played out inside the institute. On 23 November 1980, while the 1980 Irpinia earthquake struck the region, a violent uprising broke out in the prison in which three inmates were killed and more than twenty were injured.

It was in this context that Giuseppe Salvia, deputy director of the institute in the early 1980s, enforced the rules even against inmates affiliated with Raffaele Cutolo's Nuova Camorra Organizzata, refusing to grant Cutolo privileges and subjecting him to routine searches. For this firmness Salvia was sentenced to death by the clans: on 14 April 1981 his car was pulled alongside on the Naples ring road and he was shot dead. In 2013 the prison was named after him and, by decree of the President of the Republic, he was posthumously awarded the Gold Medal of Civil Valor.

The institute's memory is also tied to other members of the custodial and penitentiary police corps who died in those years: officer Nicandro Izzo, responsible for checking parcels addressed to inmates, killed in Naples on 31 January 1983 and later recognized as a victim of duty (the prison of Viterbo is now named after him); superintendent Pasquale Campanello, who served in the maximum-security wings, killed in Mercogliano on 8 February 1993 and after whom the institute's conference hall is named; and officer Aniello Vittoria (born in Avella in 1965), posthumously awarded the Gold Medal of Civil Valor after drowning on 1 June 1986 while trying to save two swimmers at Foce Sele.

=== Recent developments ===
In 1983, in the area that had housed the workshops for inmate labour, a bunker courtroom was built for the trial of the Nuova Camorra Organizzata known as the "Tortora trial", later subdivided into four bunker courtrooms used for proceedings of particular importance. In 1998 an underground tunnel about 900 metres long was built, directly connecting the institute to the new Naples Palace of Justice, to allow for quick and secure transfers of inmates.

The facility has hosted several visits of national significance. In November 1990 Pope John Paul II met with inmates; in 2010 Italian President Giorgio Napolitano chose Poggioreale for the first official visit by an Italian head of state to a penal institution; in March 2015 Pope Francis met with inmates and shared a meal with them.

In the 2010s the institute was at the centre of the judicial affair known as the "cella zero" ("cell zero") case: based on complaints from several former inmates, who reported abuse suffered between 2012 and 2014, twelve penitentiary police officers were sent to trial; the defendants waived the statute of limitations, asking to be judged on the merits, and in March 2023 the Naples court acquitted all of them, ruling that the alleged acts had not occurred.

On 8 March 2020, during the COVID-19 pandemic in Italy, a riot broke out at the institute after the announcement that visits with family members would be suspended to contain the risk of infection; inmates also demanded measures to ensure cell cleanliness and reduce the risk of the virus spreading. The protest caused damage to furnishings and wings and left some officers and inmates with minor injuries. Over those events, in November 2022 the Naples public prosecutor's office secured a preliminary hearing date for 56 inmates.

== Structure and pavilions ==
Built according to the three-storey panopticon model typical of the late nineteenth century, the complex is made up of eight central buildings, the "pavilions", originally separate and later connected by a long linking corridor. Over time the wings took the names of Italian cities: Napoli, Milano, Livorno, Genova, Torino, Venezia, Avellino, Firenze, Salerno, and Roma (the latter originally a women's prison, known as "Italia"). The "San Paolo" pavilion was later built to house the Diagnostic and Therapeutic Centre (Centro Diagnostico Terapeutico, CDT), the prison's hospital, which also takes in patients from other penal institutes.

In its most recent configuration the institute is effectively organized into twelve pavilions, each with a specific treatment purpose: among others, the Livorno wing is for inmates serving final sentences, the Roma pavilion for inmates with drug addiction problems, the Firenze wing for new arrivals, the Torino wing for protected inmates, the Milano wing for a section under Article 32 of the enforcement regulation, the left side of the Avellino wing for the high-security regime (AS3) and the right side for isolation; the San Paolo pavilion is dedicated to healthcare. Some wings (Napoli and part of Genova) have undergone renovation work, resulting in reduced capacity.

== Overcrowding and detention conditions ==
The institute has for decades recorded a number of inmates above its regulatory capacity. According to the 22nd report by the Antigone association (2026), with 2,101 people present at the time of the visit it is the most populous penal institute in Italy; the regional report on Campania notes the presence of cells holding eight to ten people. In a follow-up visit, the National Guarantor for the rights of persons deprived of personal liberty recorded 2,223 inmates against a regulatory capacity of 1,571 places; the 2025 annual report of the Campania regional guarantor indicates an overcrowding rate of 134%.

Between 2024 and 2025 Poggioreale was, together with the prison of Verona, the institute with the highest number of inmate suicides in Italy, with six cases; according to data from the Campania guarantor, since the start of 2025 there have also been 25 attempted suicides and more than 200 acts of self-harm. The same guarantor reported a shortage of around two hundred penitentiary police officers and medical staff, stating that "the right to dignity is not negotiable".

In July 2026 the institute was visited by a delegation from the "Alliance for Article 27", an initiative bringing together representatives of institutions, the legal profession, and civil society to assess whether detention conditions comply with the rehabilitative purpose of punishment and the ban on treatment contrary to human dignity set out in Article 27 of the Constitution of Italy.

== In popular culture ==
The prison is deeply rooted in twentieth-century Neapolitan popular tradition; in Naples the word "Poggioreale" is effectively synonymous with prison.

The prison is referenced in various songs. From 1972 is the song Puceriale (Neapolitan for Poggioreale) by Mario Trevi. It is mentioned in Giuvaniello, a song by the Nuova Compagnia di Canto Popolare (1977), in the 1990 song Don Raffaè by Fabrizio De André, from the album Le nuvole, and in Gimmerulove by Almamegretta, in 2016.

On screen, the institute was used as a filming location for the TV film Il caso Enzo Tortora – Dove eravamo rimasti? (2017), directed by Ricky Tognazzi, in which the prison where Enzo Tortora was held was recreated within the actual buildings of Poggioreale. The story of Giuseppe Salvia and prison life in those years is the subject of the documentary Le ultime parole del boss (2022), directed by Raffaele Brunetti and based on the investigative book of the same name by Antonio Mattone.

== Bibliography ==
- Mattone, Antonio. E adesso la palla passa a me. Malavita, solitudine e riscatto nel carcere. Naples: Guida Editori, 2017.
- Mattone, Antonio. La vendetta del boss. L'omicidio di Giuseppe Salvia. Preface by Andrea Riccardi. Naples: Guida Editori, 2021. ISBN 978-88-6866-746-7.

== See also ==
- Secondigliano Prison
