= Francesco Autoriello =

Italian painter (1824–1894)

Francesco Autoriello (January 1824 – August 28, 1894) was an Italian painter, mainly depicting historical canvases.

== Biography ==
Born in Naples, he moved to Salerno and was initially self-trained as a painter at age 16. He later taught design at the Seminary of Salerno and a school run by Benedictines. He painted from Cava de' Tirreni until 1855, and then went to study at the Academy of Fine Arts of Naples under Filippo Palizzi. He first participated at the Promotrice of Naples in 1862, with a Children of Jefte; in 1864, Virtue and Labor. He then began producing works of genre and history. At the 1877 National Exposition in Naples, he exhibited a large canvas depicting The Assassination of the Huguenot Admiral Coligny on the Night of San Bartolomew (bought by the Municipality of Naples and exhibited in Museo di Castel Nuovo). At the Turin exhibition of 1884, he exhibited Socrates visits Aspasia.

Other works include Vendemmiatori precoci (exhibited in 1886 at Naples); L'operaio e la sua famiglia, (exhibited in 1893 at Milan); and Consulto in Convento (1887). He also painted the canvases on the ceilings of the church of San Francesco in Cava dei Tirreni; frescoes for the walls and chapels of the chapel of the Orphanage (Asilo Infantile) of Cava; and a large watercolor copy of painting of the Last Judgement, once in the Sala Storica of the Church of Santa Donna Regina Nuova (awarded diploma of merit at the 1876 Naples exhibition).

In 1881, he became professor of design, figure, and perspective at the Royal Institute of Fine Arts in Naples, and later professor of perspective at the Academy in Salerno. He published a text on perspective: Corso Completo di Prospettiva Ragionata 2nd edizione. in Naples 1880. The text was used in the Institute at Naples.

He painted the Dance of the Hours in the Sala Rossa of the Casino dei Nobili in Salerno, where he worked alongside Giulio Minervini, Carlo Tito Dalbono, Demetrio Salazaro, and Federico Travaglini.
