= Secondigliano Prison =

Prison in Naples, Italy

- Interactive map of Secondigliano Prison
- Location: Via Roma verso Scampia, 350 Naples, Campania Italy; 40°54′36″N 14°14′41″E
- Status: Operational
- Security class: High Security / 41-bis
- Capacity: 1,112
- Population: 1,534 (18 September 2026)
- Opened: 1991
- Managed by: Ministry of Justice

Secondigliano Prison (Italian: Carcere di Secondigliano), officially the "Pasquale Mandato" Penitentiary Centre (Italian: Centro penitenziario "Pasquale Mandato"), is a prison in Naples, Italy, located in the Scampia district at via Roma verso Scampia, 350. With a state-owned area of roughly 40 hectares (about 384,000 m²), it is one of the largest penitentiary complexes in Italy, and it houses mostly prisoners held under the high-security circuit and the 41-bis regime of the Italian penitentiary system.

Although officially named after "Secondigliano", the prison actually stands within the territory of the Scampia district.

Since 16 May 2016 the prison has been named after Pasquale Mandato, a chief marshal of the Corps of Custodial Agents (Corpo degli agenti di custodia) who was killed in a Camorra ambush on 5 March 1983. While serving at the prison of Santa Maria Capua Vetere, where he was head of the registry office and deputy commander, Mandato was killed shortly before starting his shift; he had previously received threats connected to his work in a prison holding prominent members of organized crime. Michelangelo D'Agostino, the killer, was convicted for the murder. Mandato was posthumously awarded the Gold Medal of Civil Merit and recognized as a "victim of duty".

== History ==
The prison originated from a project that followed the 1975 reform of the Italian penitentiary system and was built using modern techniques; it was inaugurated and handed over to the penitentiary administration in 1991. Its opening came during the phase of maximum expansion of Italy's prison population in the 1990s, during which the number of inmates in the country doubled.

== Structure ==
The complex, among the largest in Italy, is arranged in several building units: two two-storey blocks with about 200 places each (named "Adriatico" and "Tirreno"), two three-storey blocks with about 300 places each ("Ionio" and "Ligure"), two sections linked by long corridors (T1 and T2), and an infirmary. A detached four-storey pavilion houses the Diagnostic and Therapeutic Centre (Centro Diagnostico Terapeutico, CDT), which includes a small section for inmates with physical disabilities; outside the perimeter wall is the section reserved for inmates on day release.

The institute also has a pavilion providing Intensified Assistance Service (Servizio di Assistenza Intensificata, SAI), which provides healthcare to inmates transferred from institutes throughout Italy, and a mental health unit (Articolazione per la Salute Mentale, ASM) for inmates with psychiatric conditions. The complex also includes a shooting range and the building of the Provincial Prisoner Transport and Escort Unit (Nucleo provinciale traduzioni e piantonamenti).

Secondigliano is one of Italy's main institutes for high-security detention: it includes sections for the 41-bis regime and sections for collaborators of justice, as well as a high-security pavilion and a reduced-custody facility. According to monitoring by the Antigone Association, it is the institute holding the largest number of inmates assigned to the AS3 sub-circuit (leading figures of organizations engaged in drug trafficking).

== Capacity and overcrowding ==
According to Ministry of Justice figures updated to 18 September 2026, the prison had 1,112 regulatory places, 16 of which were unavailable, and held 1,534 inmates. In the annual report he presented in Naples in May 2026, the Campania regional ombudsman for the rights of persons deprived of liberty, Samuele Ciambriello, put the occupancy rate of Secondigliano at more than 142 per cent, with 1,578 inmates for 1,111 places, against 8,016 inmates for 6,173 places across the region in April 2026. The same report recorded 3,265 prison officers in post across the region against an authorised strength of 3,706, and an average of 50 to 60 prisoner escorts a week not carried out between Poggioreale and Secondigliano for lack of staff.

== Education ==
The prison has various spaces dedicated to treatment, study, and work activities. A University Prison Programme (Polo Universitario Penitenziario) operates in cooperation with the University of Naples Federico II, allowing inmates to pursue university studies. Since the 1996–1997 school year, a satellite branch of the Enrico Caruso State Higher Education Institute has been active, offering courses in administration, finance and marketing and in food, wine, and hospitality services; with several hundred students enrolled each year, it is considered one of the largest prison education programmes in southern Italy and in the country as a whole.

The prison also has an Arts and Crafts Centre (Polo Arti e Mestieri), with woodworking, metalworking, and tailoring workshops and a mechatronics workshop responsible for maintaining the regional Polizia Penitenziaria vehicle fleet, as well as an agricultural estate, workshops (including lutherie and archive digitization), and numerous theatrical, sporting, and cultural activities.

== See also ==
- Poggioreale Prison
