= Località =

Types of minor population areas in Italy

A località is an inhabited place in Italy that is not accorded a more significant distinction in administrative law, such as a frazione, comune, municipio, circoscrizione, or quartiere. The word is cognate to English locality. The Italian National Institute of Statistics defines località abitata (lit. 'inhabited locality') as an "area of more or less size, normally known by its own name, in which are situated either grouped or scattered houses".

Three types of inhabited locality are distinguished:

- centro abitato – a group of houses with roads, squares or other small gaps between them, and public services or establishments where residents congregate for religious, educational or business purposes or for obtaining provisions
- nucleo abitato – a group of houses with at least five households, but without the type of place where residents gather, as in a centro abitato
- case sparse – houses spread over the countryside or along roads with such a distance between them that they do not form a residential nucleus

Most comuni or municipalities have several località, occasionally several dozens, while some have none. The subdivision is optional. In practice, most località are small habitations, hamlets, and occasionally a mere clump of houses.

== See also ==
- Circoscrizione
- Frazione
- Quartiere
- Rione
  - Rioni of Rome
- Sestiere
- Terziere
