= Sant'Angelo a Segno =

Church building in Naples, Italy

Coordinates: 40.8507°N 14.2562°E

Sant'Angelo a Segno, Naples Sant’Angelo a Segno or Sant’Archangelo a Segno is a Roman Catholic church in Naples, Italy, located on Via dei Tribunali number 45.

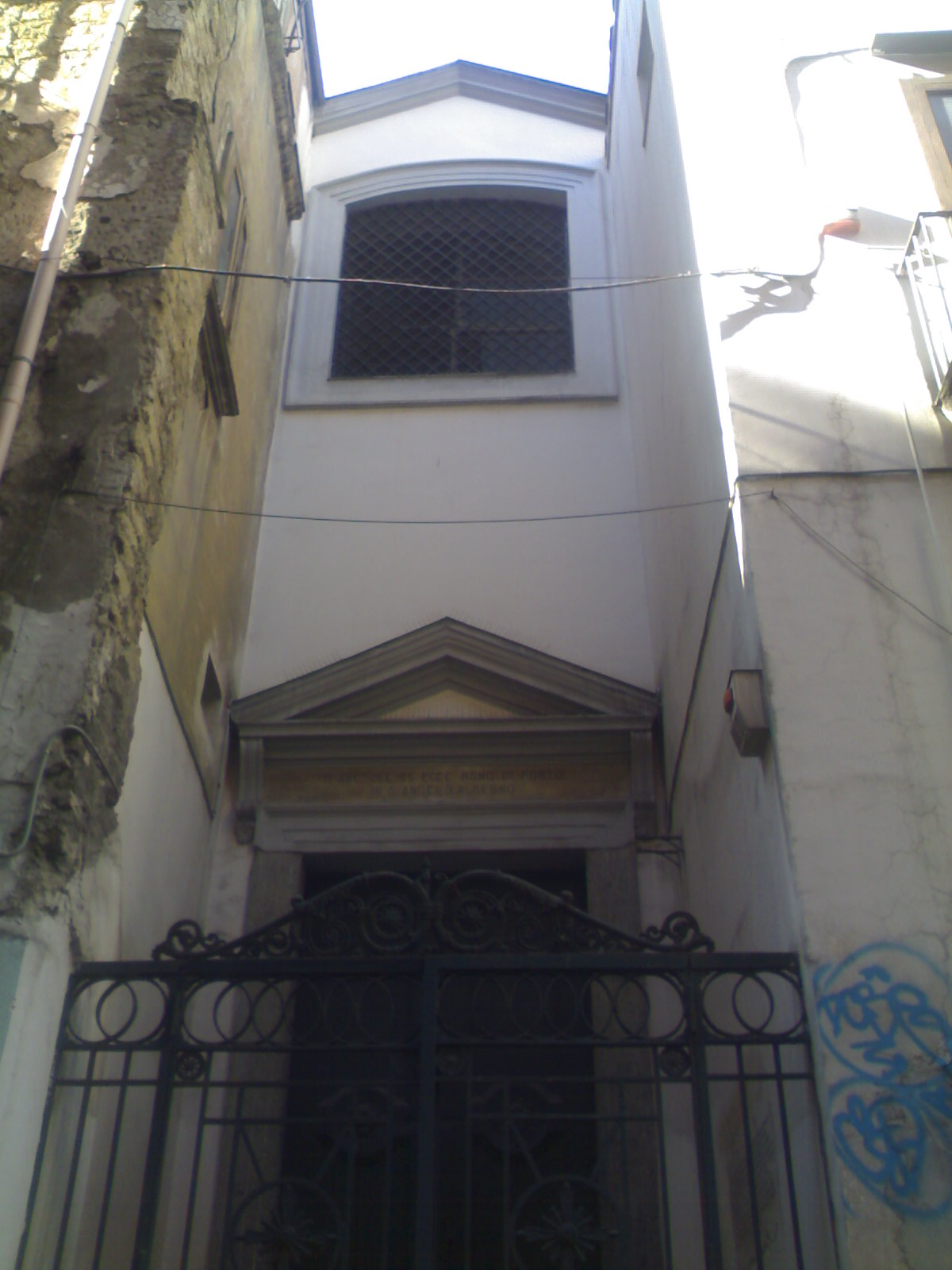
Entrance portal to church.

== History ==
This church recalls the apparition of St Michael, the church's patron, alongside the army of Giacomo di Marra and the bishop Sant'Agnello of Naples (also called Sant'Aniello Abate) during a 6th-century repulse of besieging Lombards. The church was called a Segno (a sign) because it putatively had a nail driven into the marble as a testament that here was the limit of Lombard penetration into Naples. Other sources anachronistically invoke battles against the Saracens.

A plaque at the front door still commemorates the victory of in Neapolitan forces over the Lombards. A church at the site likely dates to the 7th century, although the present structure dates to a reconstruction in 1825 by Luigi Malesi. The artworks once inside the church are now in the Museo di Capodimonte: including a Circumcision of Christ (1622) by Simon Vouet, St Thomas of Canterbury, a work by a member of the school of Giovanni Balducci, Santa Rosa, by Simonelli, a member of the school of Luca Giordano, and the main altarpiece of St Michael Archangel by Francesco Pagano. The church is closed for worship.

== See also ==
- Churches in Naples
