= 4th municipality of Naples =

Fourth Municipality of Naples Municipalità 4 Quarta Municipalità
- Borough
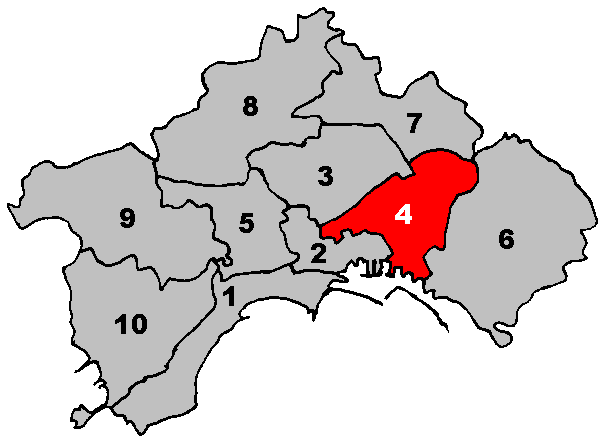
- Location within Naples
- Coordinates: 40°51′4.92″N 14°17′19.56″E
- Country: Italy
- Municipality: Naples
- Established: 2005
- Seat: Via Emanuele Gianturco, 91

Government
  - President: Giampiero Perrella

Area
  - Total: 9.27 km^{2} (3.58 sq mi)

Population (2007)
  - Total: 96,078
  - Density: 10,400/km^{2} (26,800/sq mi)
- Website: M4 on Naples site

The Fourth Municipality (In Italian: Quarta Municipalità or Municipalità 4) is one of the ten boroughs in which the Italian city of Naples is divided.

== Geography ==
The municipality is located in central-eastern area of the city and includes the eastern branch of the Port of Naples.

Its territory includes the zones of Decumani, Historic Centre of Naples (partly included), Porta San Gennaro, Port'Alba, Porta Capuana, Borgo Sant'Antonio Abate, Vasto, Arenaccia, Piazza Garibaldi (railway), Sant'Erasmo, Rione Luzzatti, Rione Ascarelli, Rione Sant'Alfonso, Zona Cimiteriale (cemetery of Poggioreale) and Stadera.

== Administrative division ==
The Fourth Municipality is divided into 4 quarters:

Quarter	Population	Area (km²)
Poggioreale	25,257	4.45
San Lorenzo	49,275	1.42
Vicaria	15,464	0.72
Zona Industriale	6,082	2.68
Total	96,078	9.27

== See also ==
- Centro Direzionale
