= Santa Caterina a Formiello =

Church of Santa Caterina a Formiello
- Chiesa di Santa Caterina a Formiello
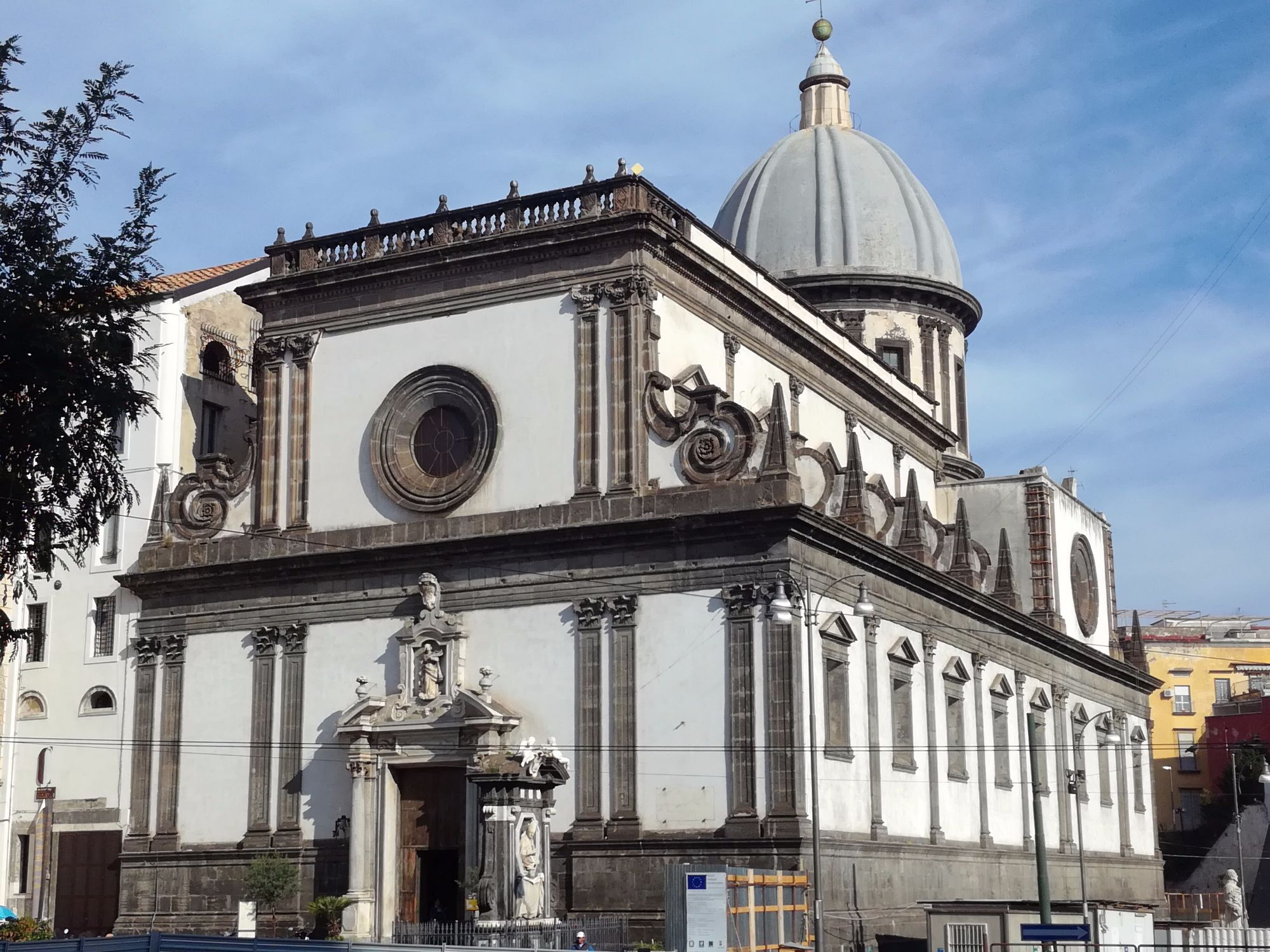
- Church of Santa Caterina a Formiello
- 40.8547°N 14.265°E
- Location: Naples, Campania
- Country: Italy
- Denomination: Roman Catholic

History
- Status: Active

Architecture
- Architectural type: Church
- Style: Renaissance architecture
- Groundbreaking: 1515
- Completed: 1593

Administration
- Diocese: Roman Catholic Archdiocese of Naples

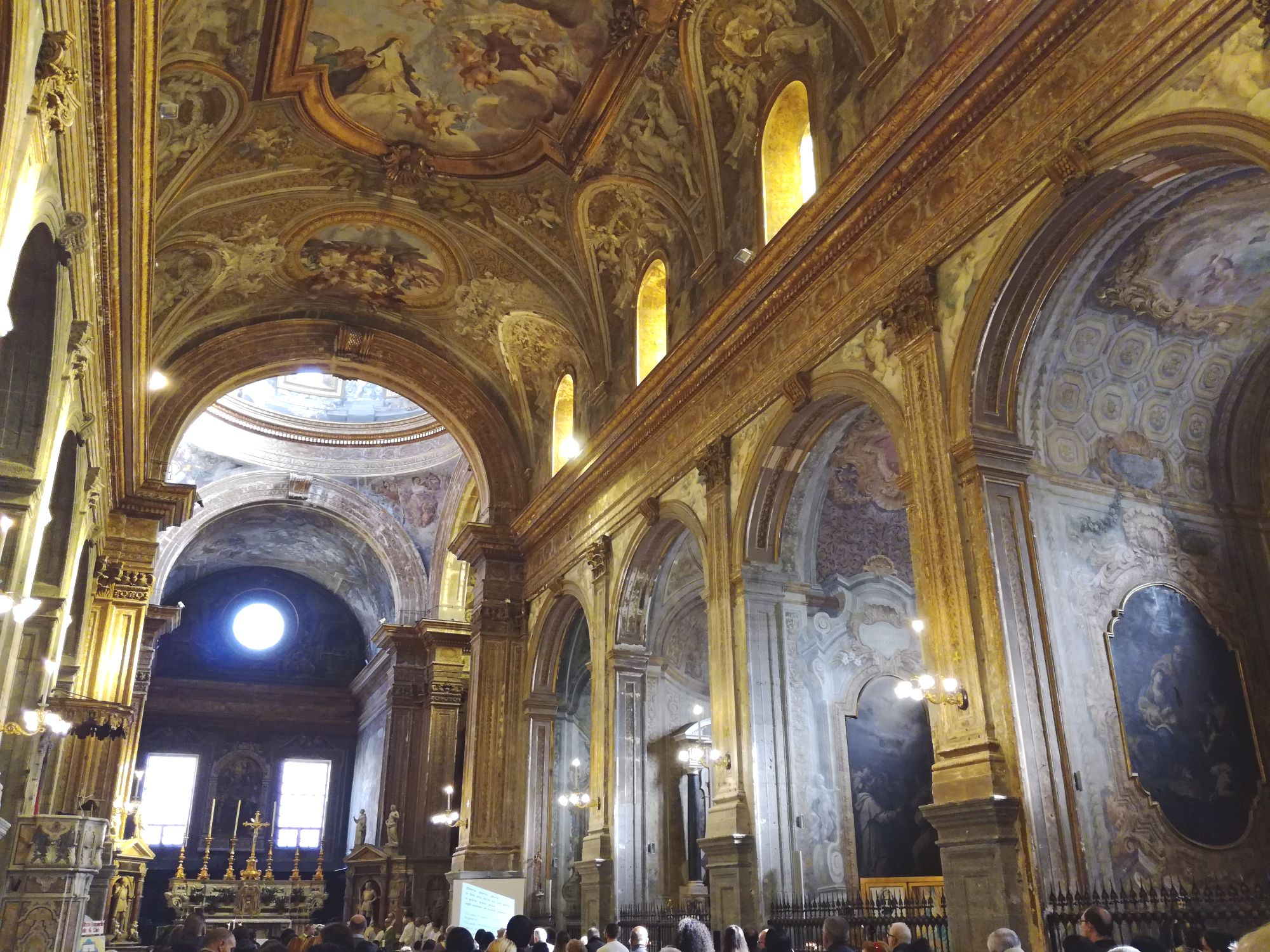
Interior.

Santa Caterina a Formiello is a church in Naples, in southern Italy, located at the extreme eastern end of the old historic center of the city, on Via Carbonara and Piazza Enrico de Nicola, near the gate called Porta Capuana. The term Formiello comes from the forms or containers for water spouts found in the convent. Diagonally across the street and South is the Fontana del Formiello against the rear wall of the imposing Castel Capuano.

== History ==
Construction of the church began about 1510, designed by the Florentine Antonio della Cava, and completed in 1593. The church was one of the first domes in Naples. It was funded by the noble families of Zurolo (or Zurlo) and Apriano and was dedicated to the virgin and martyred Saint of Alexandria. It was attached to an ancient convent originally linked to the Celestine order and which passed to the Dominican fathers after 1498. The convent hosted Dominicans until the 19th century, when it was expropriated, and ultimately became used as a wool factory.

== Architecture ==
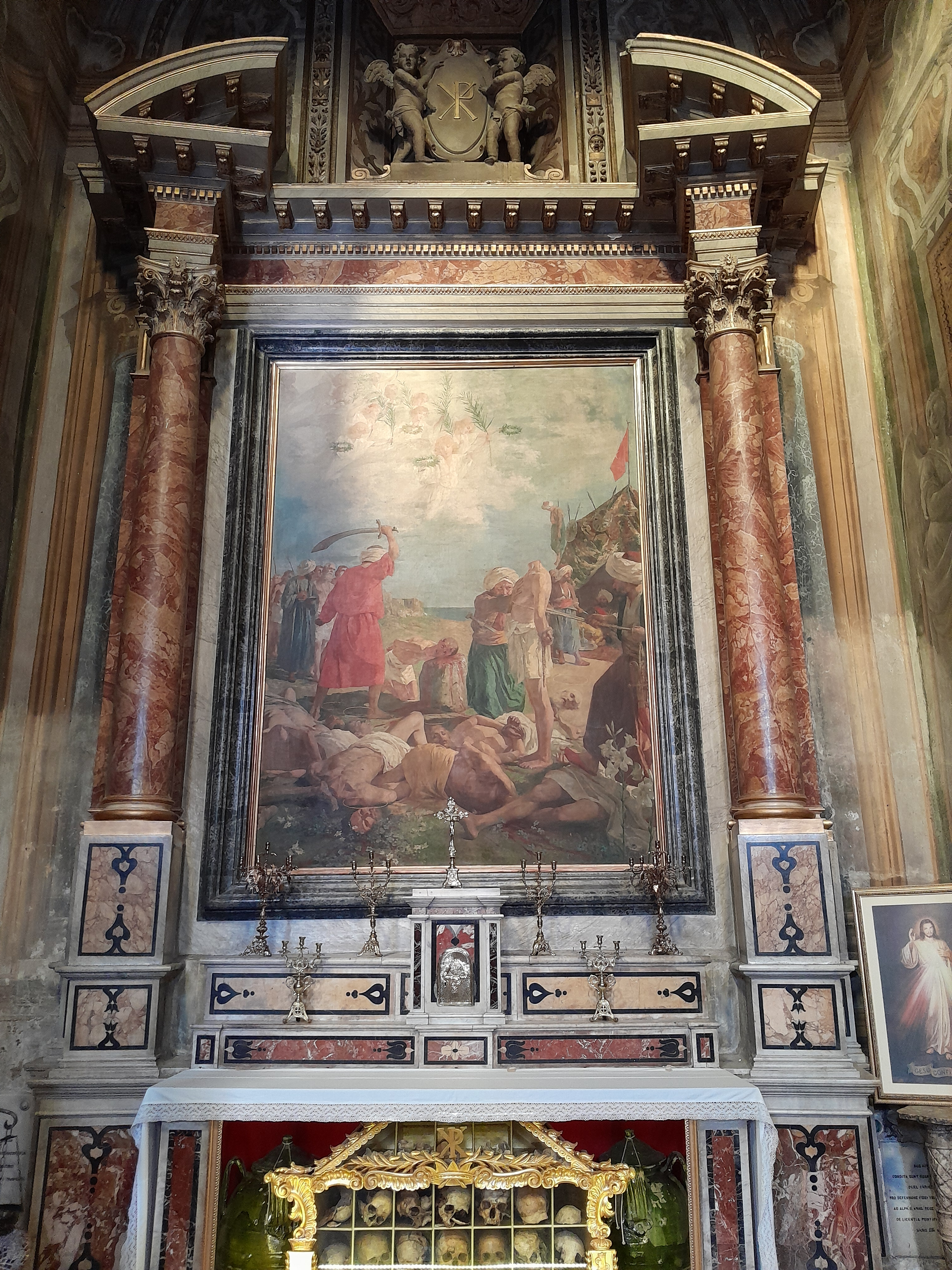
Interior

The church has a single-aisle Latin cross interior covered by a barrel vault with five chapels on either side. The Roman Mannerist painter, Luigi Garzi, painted the large picture on the counterfacade. He also painted the triangles above the arches of the chapels, the corbels of the dome, and the great vault of the nave. The dome was painted by Paolo de Matteis. The ceilings of the chapels have frescoes by Guglielmo Borremans; the choir decorations and painting were by Gaetano Brandi.

=== Altar ===
The main altar was commissioned by the Spinelli family of Cariati, to whom also belong the tombs that encircle it. The funereal monuments were completed by Scilla and Giannotto, two Milanese sculptors. On the wall, beside the altar is a Virgin with St Thomas Acquinas by Francesco Curia. A chapel on the other side has a canvas of St Dominic defeats the Albigensian Heretics by Giacomo del Po: the statues are by Columbo Napolitano.

=== Paintings ===
In the first chapel, all the paintings dedicated to St Catherine of Alessandria are by Giacomo del Po, the Visitation was painted by Garzi. In the next chapel, the chapel of St James, are collected the remains of 240 Martyrs of Otranto, that had been moved to Naples in 1574. The canvas of the Epiphany was painted by Silvestro Buono, and the Circumcision was completed by Paolo de Matteis. The Conversion of St. Paul was painted by Marco da Siena. The St Vincenzo Ferreri was painted by Santolo Cirillo.

== See also ==
- 16th-century Western domes
