= Column of the Vicariate =

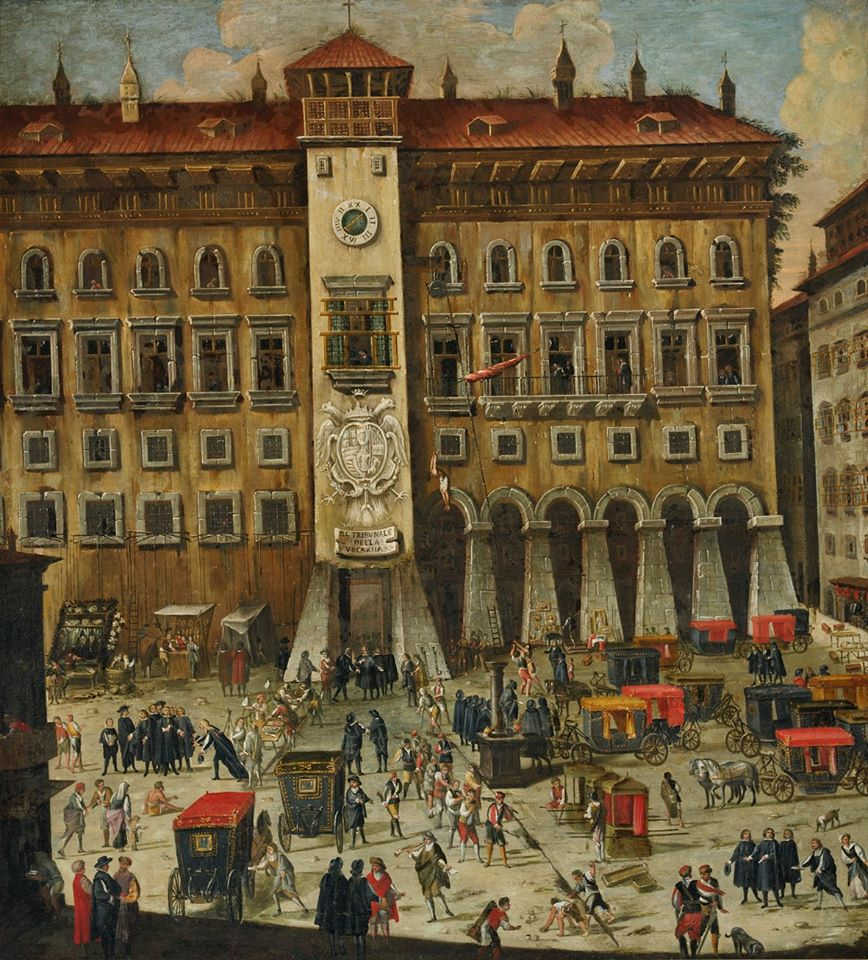
The column is visible to the right and front of the entrance of Castel Capuano, in this 17th century image.

The Column of the Vicariate or Colonna della Vicaria was a simple white marble column on a pedestal that formerly stood outside the Castel Capuano along Via dei Tribunali in Naples, Italy. It was used by the government first as a place for punishment of debtors.

Prior to the reign of the viceroy Don Pedro de Toledo, tradition holds that those unable to pay debts were either chained or approached the column on their knees, then exposed their backside to the public, stating his penance, and stating cedo bonis (I cede my goods). It has been described as the sacrificial altar of the debtor.

Don Pedro of Toledo modified the tradition. In 1546, he ordered that the debtor instead had to approach the pillar and state his name, that of the lender in a clear and loud voice, and he had to stay for an hour bareheaded, embracing the column. A plaque in 1553 commemorated abolition of the former tradition. Later decrees required those who were debtors to wear certain hats with ribbons; failure to comply meant service in the galleys.

In later centuries, the column was used as a site to exhibit unclaimed cadavers, and crowds came to rubberneck the bodies for spectacle. The column was taken down in 1856 and moved to the Museum of San Martino.
