= Charles Mellin =

French painter (1597–1649)

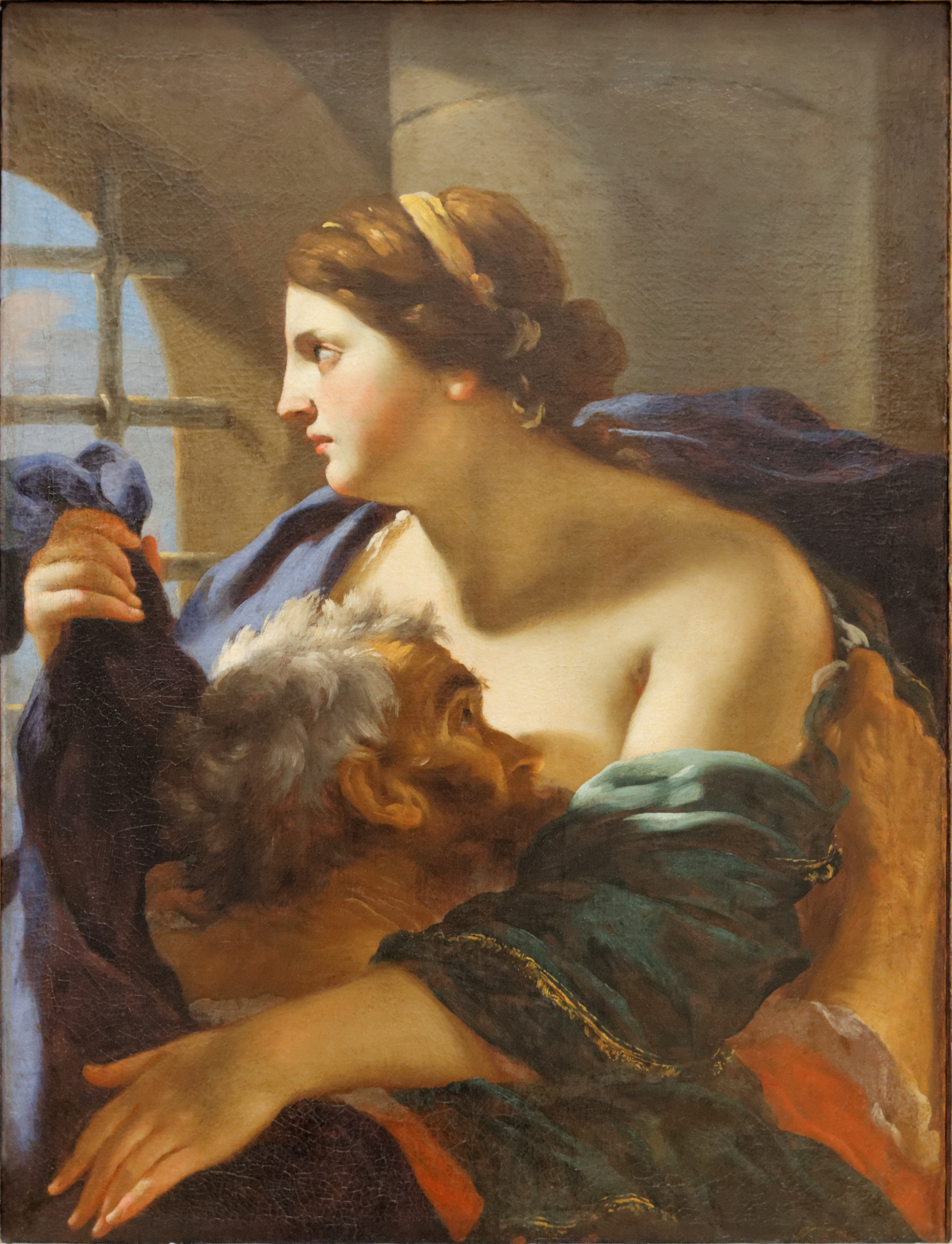
Cimon and Pero

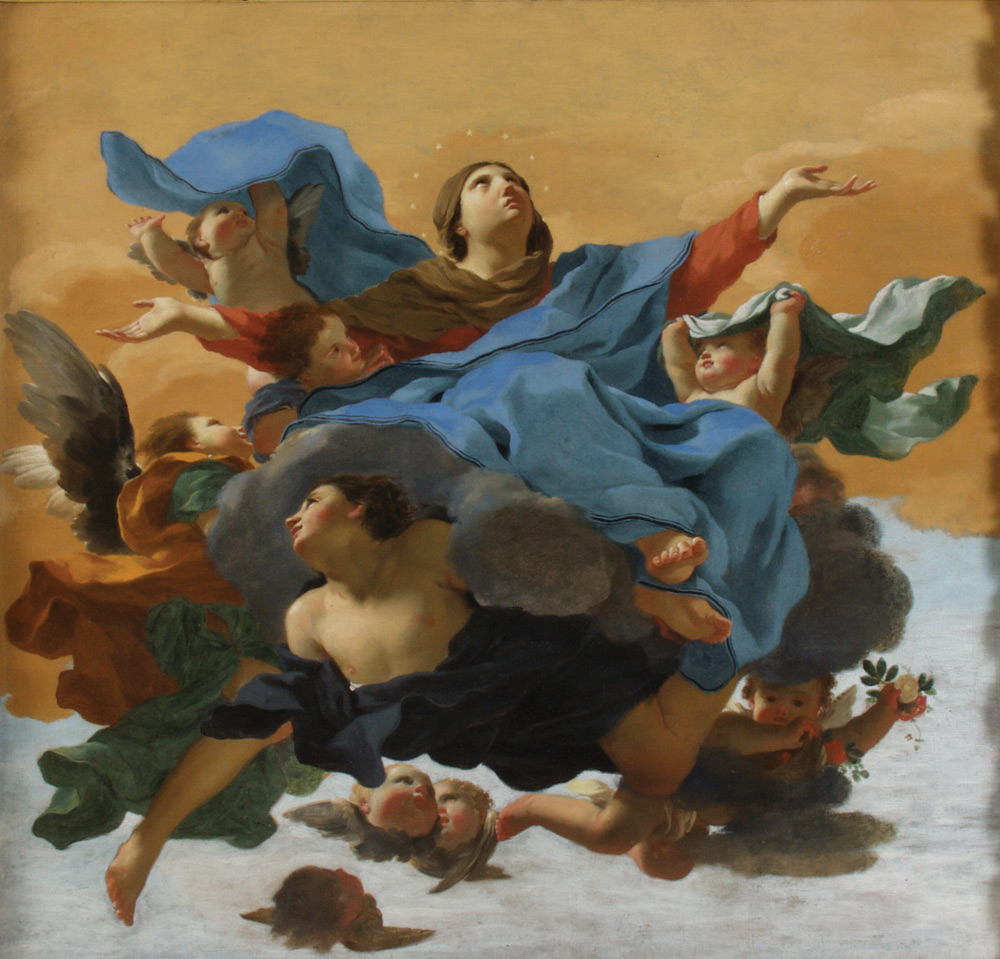
Asunción de la Virgen at Museo de Arte de Ponce, Ponce, Puerto Rico

Charles Mellin (French pronunciation: [ʃaʁl mɛlɛ̃]; 1597 – 21 September 1649) was a French painter of the Baroque era. He was from Nancy, Lorraine, but spent his artistic career in Italy, where he was nicknamed Carlo Lorenese ("Charles the Lorrainer").

== Life and work ==
Mellin was born in Nancy in 1597.

He worked on murals and decorated the Chapel of the Virgin at the church of San Luigi dei Francesi in Rome in 1631. He had competed with Nicolas Poussin and Giovanni Lanfranco for the job of decorating this chapel. During the early part of his career, Mellin collaborated with, and was influenced by, Simon Vouet, but Vouet's influence diminished after Vouet left Italy for Paris. He is also said to have been influenced by Domenichino.

After Vouet's departure, he worked for the Muti Papazzurri family as official painter. He decorated the Palazzo Muti between 1628 and 1631, painting the vaults of the Galleria, and remnants of his work there still survive. He also taught painting to the two sons of the Muti Papazzurri family.

In Rome, he painted a fresco, St. Francis de Paul before Sixtus V, for the church of Trinità dei Monti.

He also decorated the choir at the Abbey of Monte Cassino from 1636 until 1637 with a cycle of 15 paintings, which was destroyed during the Battle of Monte Cassino in World War II.

From 1643 to 1647 he worked in Naples. He created a Purification of the Virgin for the high altar of the church of the Santissima Annunziata Maggiore in the city, which was completed in 1645. This painting was lost in a 1757 fire, but there is an etched copy that survives. In Naples, he painted an Immaculate Conception (1646) and an Annunciation (1647) for the church of Santa Donna Regina Nuova. The revolt of Masaniello caused him to leave Naples for Rome.

He trained painters, such as Nicolas Labbé, but did not have a workshop per se.

He died in Rome in 1649.

== Works ==
- The Holy Family with the Infant St. John. Oil on canvas - 58,5 x 74,5 cm. Paris, private collection. Simon Vouet or his workshop - Ascribed to Charles Mellin.
- Angels with Instruments of Christ’s Passion. Oil on canvas - 102 x 78 cm. Naples, Museo Nazionale di Capodimonte.
- Apollo. Oil on canvas - 108 x 86 cm Paris, private collection.
- The Assumption of the Virgin. Oil on canvas - 98,1 x 103,1 cm. Puerto Rico, Museo de Arte de Ponce.
- The Stoning of Saint Stephen. Oil on canvas - 189 x 283 cm. Caen, église Saint-Etienne
- The Stoning of Saint Stephen. Oil on canvas - 48 x 66 cm. San Casciano, Bandini-Granelli Collection.
- Saint Stephen. Oil on canvas - 61 x 48,5 cm. Nantes, Musée des Beaux-Arts.
- The Sacrifice of Abel. Oil on canvas - 38 x 29,5 cm. Nancy, Musée Lorrain.
- The Annunciation. Pen, brown ink and wash - 20,6 x 21,2 cm. Montpellier, Musée Fabre.
- Saint Stephen. Attributed to the circle of Charles Mellin. Oil on canvas - 101 x 139 cm. Ajaccio, Musée Fesch.
- Portrait of a Gentleman. Attributed to Charles Mellin. Gemäldegalerie, Berlin. 1630. Oil on canvas. 121 cm (47.64 in). Height: 203 cm (79.92 in).

== Sources ==
- Philippe Malgouyres, Charles Mellin, un Lorrain entre Rome et Naples, Somogy Editions d’Art. ISBN 978-2-7572-0078-0.
