= Santolo Cirillo =

Italian painter

Fresco by Cirillo for San Paolo Maggiore, Naples

Santolo Cirillo (active first half of 18th century, died 1742) was an Italian painter, engraver, and stucco artist, active in Naples, Kingdom of Naples. He was born in Grumo Nevano, a town near Naples. He contributed frescoes and paintings the Cathedral of San Gennaro, the Basilica of Santa Restituta, and Santa Donna Regina Nuova in Naples. He also painted for the Basilica di San Tammaro in his home town of Grumo Nevano. He frescoed in 1733 a Miracle of San Domenico and a San Pio in Prayer for Santa Caterina a Formiello, painted in the style of Paolo de Matteis.
