= Fontana del Formiello =

Fountain in Naples, Italy

Coordinates: 40°51′14″N 14°15′53″E

The Fontana del Formiello (Fountain of Formiello) is a historic public fountain located at the rear exterior of the Castel Capuano, facing Piazza Enrico de Nicola, and across the street from the church and convent of Santa Caterina a Formiello in Naples, Italy. The term Formiello comes from the forms or containers for water spouts found in the convent. The fountain had been placed in storage during the late 19th century, and reconstructed at this site in 1930.

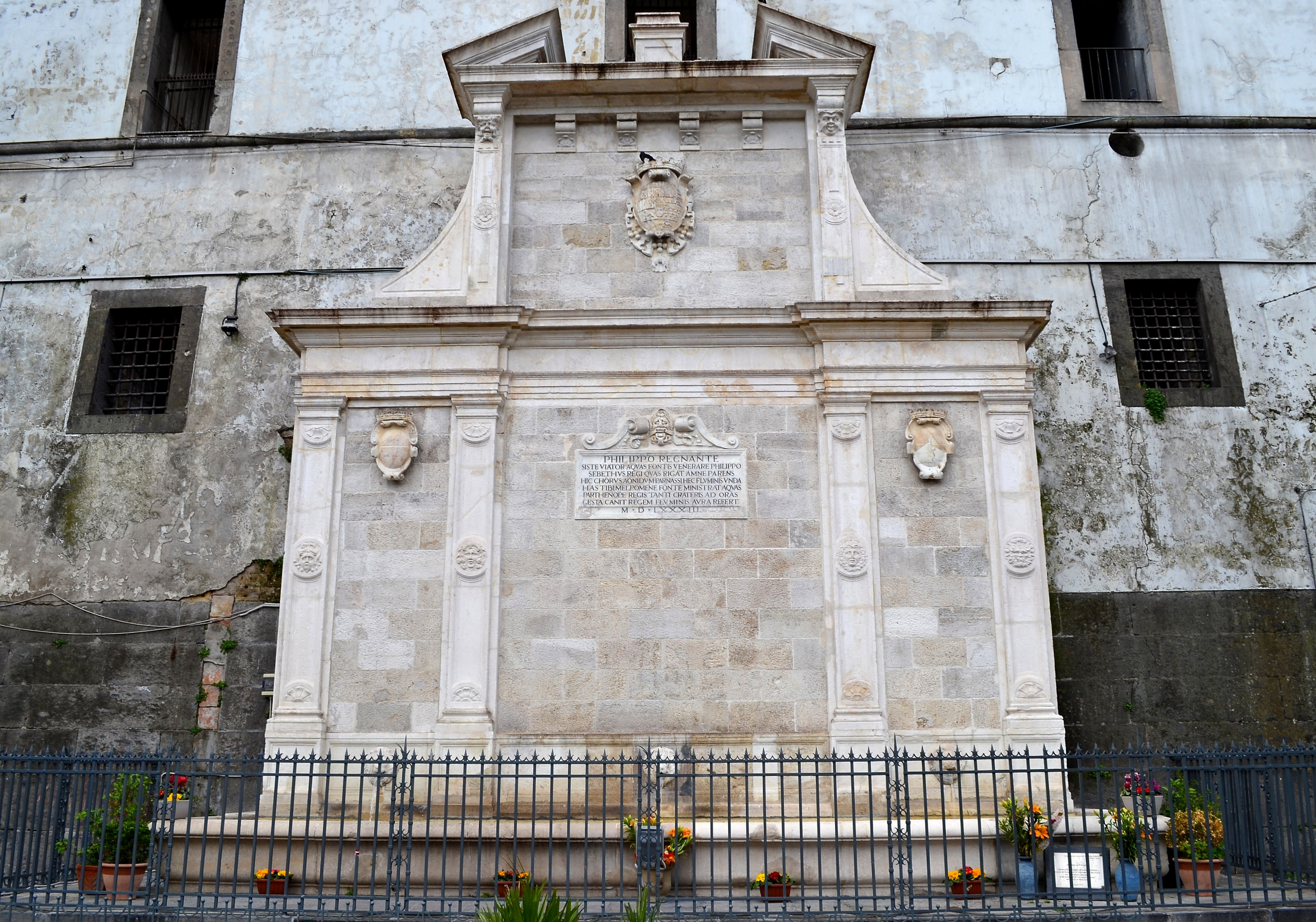
Fountain of Formiello

Mastro Joseppe and Michel De Guido were commissioned in 1573 to reconstruct a medieval fountain, originally called Fontana Reale con Abeveratoio, suggesting it was a watering station for horses. Three lion masks disgorge water, while the superior structure has a heraldic shield of the viceroy. The Shield is that of Don Pedro Tellez Giron, Duke of Osuna. A plaque in Latin states that: "While Philip II (of Spain) governed, here stopped travelers to venerate the waters of the Sebeto River, that the choirs of the Aonidi, and the waves of Parnassus, here provide you the source of Melpomene, who sings the aria of the works of the king."

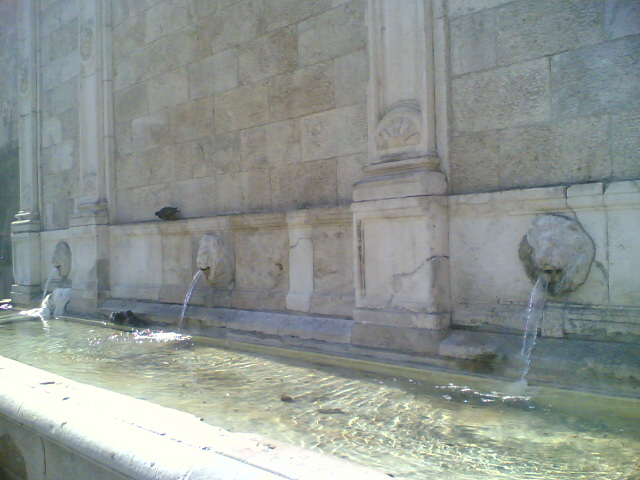
Detail

It is rumored that in the 17th century the viceroy Don Pedro Antonio of Aragon added a statue of Philip IV of Spain, but the placement was rebuffed by the people of Naples.
