= Santissima Trinità alla Cesarea =

Coordinates: 40.852170°N 14.240500°E

- Chiesa della Santissima Trinità alla Cesarea
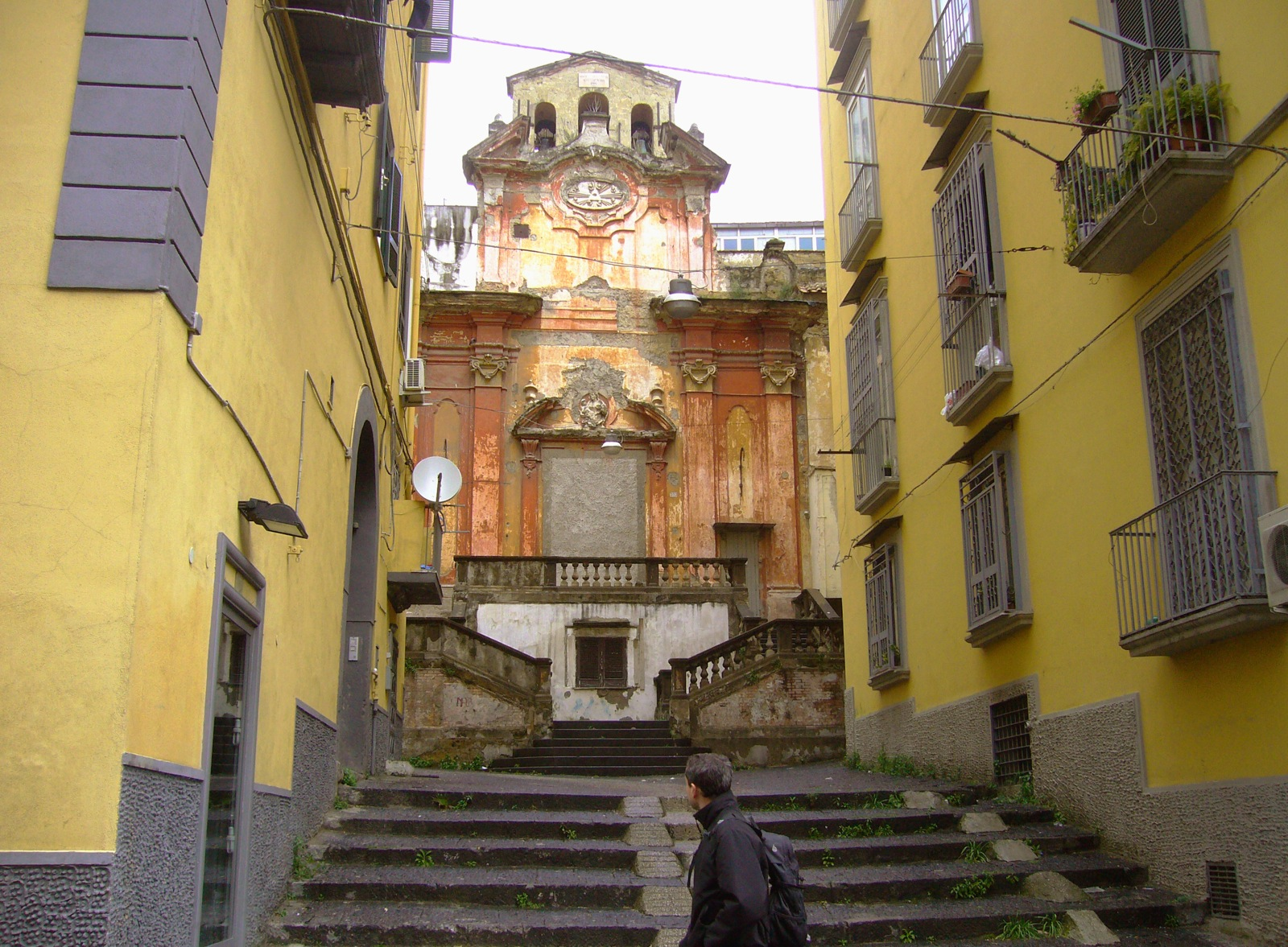
- The façade.
- Santissima Trinità alla Cesarea
- Location: Naples
- Country: Italy
- Denomination: Roman Catholic

Architecture
- Architectural type: Church

Administration
- Diocese: Roman Catholic Archdiocese of Naples

The church of the Santissima Trinità alla Cesarea (or Santa Maria del Rimedio a Salvator Rosa) is a Baroque-style church, located in Piazetta Trinità alla Cesarea, in central Naples, Italy.

== History ==
The church and the convent were built by friars for the Redemption of Captives of the Order of the Blessed Virgin Mary of Mercy. They sited it at the site by buying in the 17th century the palace of the Belmosto brothers. In this era, noble families were abandoning the low-lying neighborhoods of Naples for higher ground. The monastery later passed on to the Trinitarians, giving its present name. In 1809, the monastery was suppressed. The 1980 Irpinia earthquake, caused the church to be closed. Only in 2008 was the ceiling resealed. The facade is in a dilapidated state. The interior has a frescoed ceiling.

== Bibliography ==
- C. Celano, G.B. Chiarini, Notizie del bello, dell'antico e del curioso della Città di Napoli, Vol. VII, Naples, 1856–1860.
- G.A. Galante, Guida Sacra della Città di Napoli, Naples, 1872.
