= San Giuseppe Maggiore dei Falegnami =

Coordinates: 40.85775°N 14.29008°E

- Chiesa di San Giuseppe Maggiore dei Falegnami
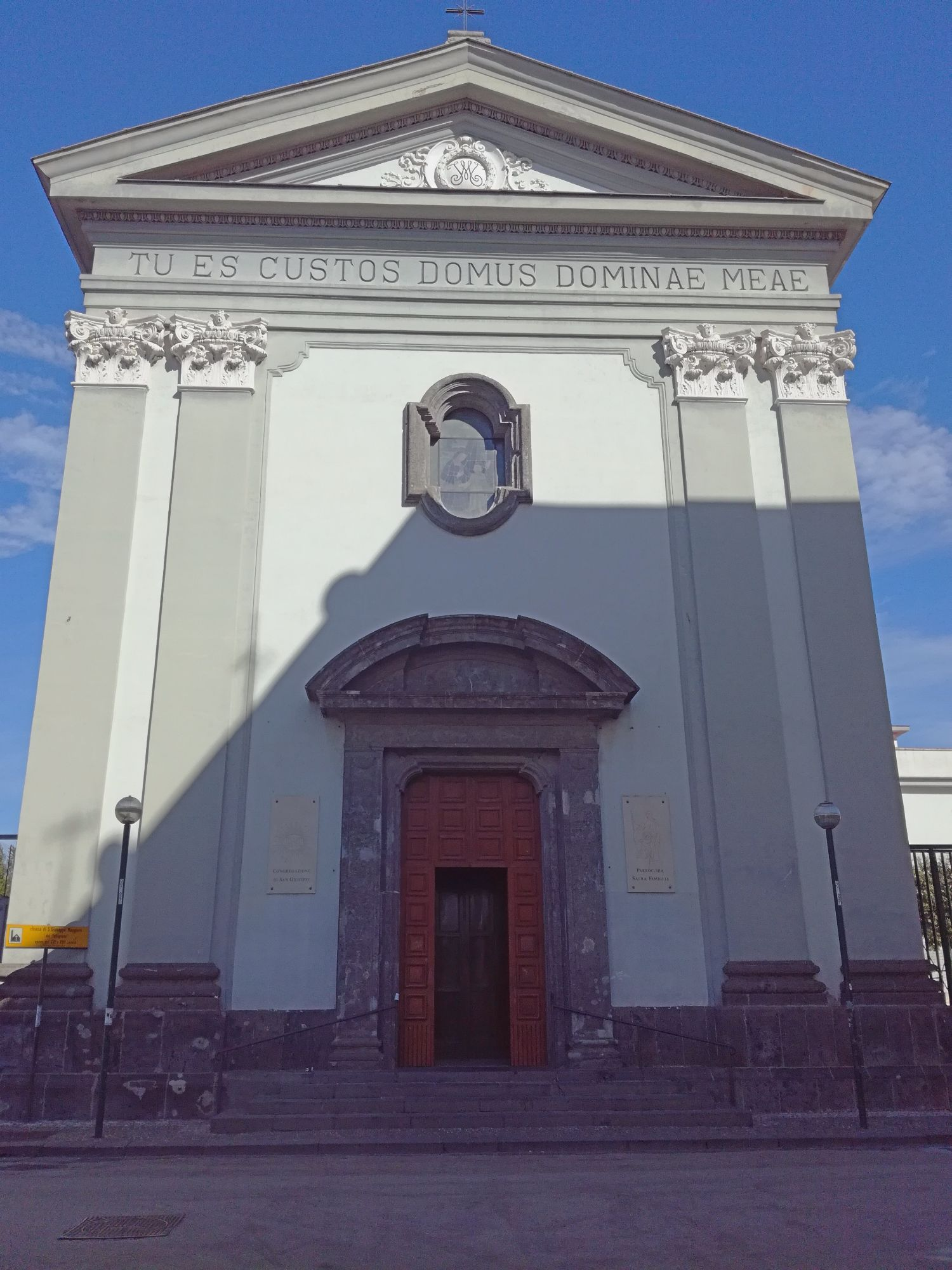
- The façade.
- San Giuseppe Maggiore dei Falegnami
- Location: Naples
- Country: Italy
- Denomination: Roman Catholic

Architecture
- Architectural type: Church

Administration
- Diocese: Roman Catholic Archdiocese of Naples

San Giuseppe Maggiore dei Falegnami is a historic church in via Carlo Bussola in the quartiere of Poggioreale, in the rione of Luzzatti in Naples, Italy.

Originally built in the 15th century; and dedicated to the Sacra Famiglia. In 1934 cardinal Alessio Ascalesi transferred the church to the jurisdiction of San Giuseppe Maggiore, and rededicated the church to St Joseph, patron of carpenters. The subterranean oratory is commonly flooded due to the low nature of central Naples and the presence of former river bed.

The interior still has works from the earliest church, for example, the Angels by Angelo Viva, the Eternal Father by Giuseppe Sanmartino, the main altar by Gaetano Barba, and two wooden statues by Giovanni da Nola (now in Museo di Capodimonte for security purposes). Other works include the Madonna and the Carmine by Girolamo Imparato and canvases of the 17th and 18th centuries. The dome is decorated with majolica tiles.

== Bibliography ==
- Touring Ed., Napoli, Guide rosse 2007, Codice ISBN 9788836543441.
