= San Lorenzo, Naples =

Coordinates: 40.851°N 14.257°E

San Lorenzo
- Quarter of Naples
- Location of San Lorenzo within Naples
- Country: Italy
- Region: Campania
- City: Naples
- Municipalità: 4th

Area
  - Total: 1.42 km^{2} (0.55 sq mi)

Population
  - Total: 48,078
  - Density: 33,900/km^{2} (87,700/sq mi)
- Postal codes: 80139, 80134, 80135, 80137, 80138, 80141 and 80142

San Lorenzo is a district of Naples, Italy. It incorporates the precise geographical center of the ancient Greco-Roman city, centered on the intersection of Via San Gregorio Armeno and Via dei Tribunali.

It also includes the area at the extreme east end of the historic center of the city and includes the church and street of San Giovanni a Carbonara as well as the eastern section of via dei Tribunali (the "street of the courthouses") once known as "via della Vicaria", since the Vicaria (the still prominent Palazzo Ricca at the east end of the street) housed the main tribunal under the Spanish vicerealm.

The modern area is situated over archaeological ruins, some of which may be visited beneath the church of San Lorenzo Maggiore. With 49,275 inhabitants on 1.42 km^{2} (2001 census), 34,701 inhabitants per km^{2}, it is the most densely populated neighbourhood of Naples and all Italy.
