= Santa Maria Donnaregina Nuova =

Church in Naples, Italy

Coordinates: 40.854000°N 14.258690°E

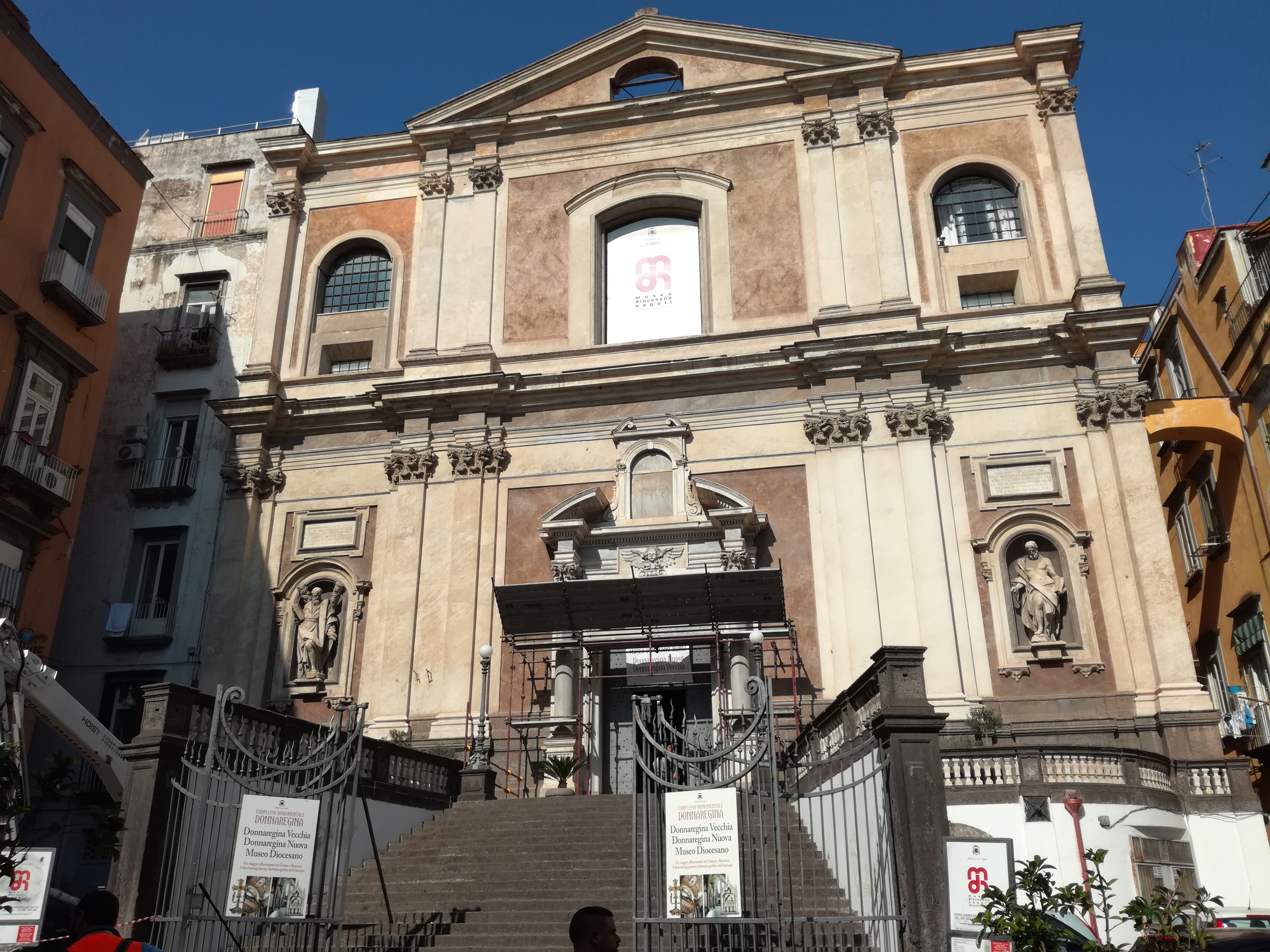
The façade of Santa Maria Donnaregina Nuova in Naples.

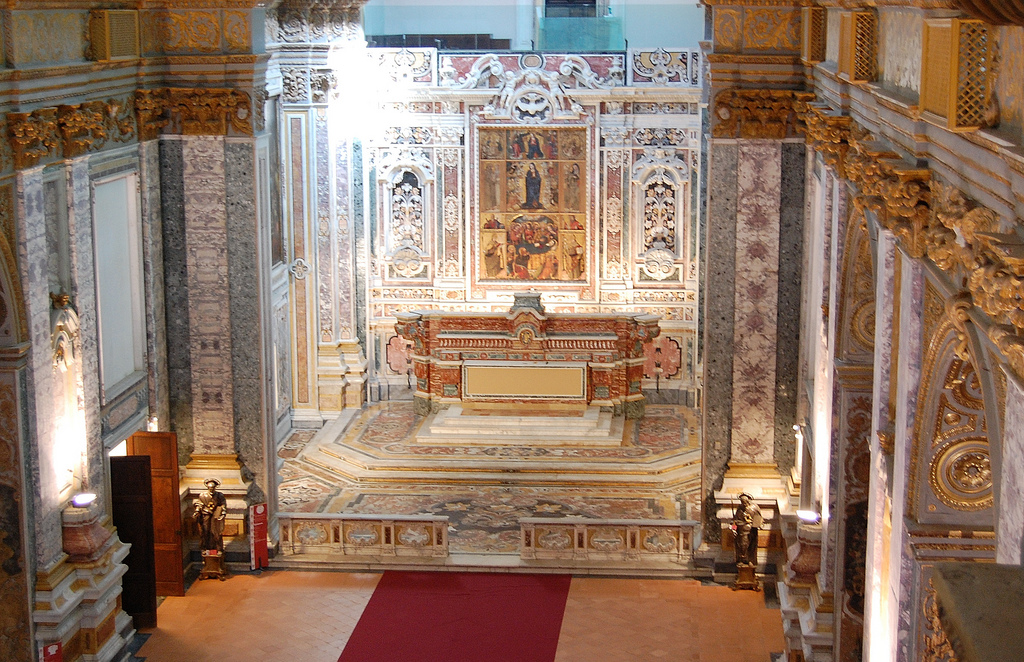
Interior.

Santa Maria Donnregina Nuova is a church in central Naples, Italy. It is called Nuova ("new") to distinguish it from the older Angevin church of Santa Maria Donna Regina Vecchia.

== History ==
The earliest church was built on this location in the 14th century. The nuns from the adjacent monastery commissioned the new structure. While traditionally the architect Giovanni Guarino, a pupil of Francesco Grimaldi was cited as the architect of the present Baroque church, more recent documentation cites Giovan Giacomo Di Conforto. The first documented payments for design were from 1626, which is also when the facade was completed. The marble portal was completed by Bernardino Landini in 1634, and the cupola in 1654. The church was consecrated in 1669. Among the architects that over the next century worked designs for parts of the structure include Arcangelo Guglielmelli and Ferdinando Sanfelice. The convent was shut down in the 1861, and the Clarisse nuns moved to the monastery of Santa Chiara. Since 2007 the church has housed the Diocesan Museum.

Originally the monastery and the church were connected by a passage between the tribune of the new church and the apse of the old one, but this was eliminated by the 1928-1934 restoration.

The façade presents a wide 17th-century staircase, and houses two stucco statues portraying Saints Andrew and Bartholomew. The interior has a single nave with six side chapels and a rich Baroque marble decoration. The ceiling has a large fresco (1654) by Francesco de Benedictis. The sides of the apse have frescoes by Francesco Solimena portraying histories of St Francis.

In the first chapel on the right are frescoes by Antonio Guastaferro; the second chapel has frescoes on the wall and ceiling by Tommaso Fasano; the third chapel has marble decoration by Gaetano Sacco based on a design by Giovan Domenico Vinaccia and frescoes by Fasano and Solimena. In the first chapel on the left are canvases by Charles Mellin; In the other chapels are the left are more paintings by Fasano.

The altar was built by Giovanni Ragozzino based on a design by Solimena; it is flanked by an altarpiece by Luca Giordano. The dome was frescoed by Agostino Beltrano.

The ante-sacristy was decorated with stucco and frescoes by Santolo Cirillo. The sacristy has paintings by Massimo Stanzione and Charles Mellin, and two still-lifes from the 16th century.

== Sources ==
- Regina, Vincenzo (2004). Le chiese di Napoli. Viaggio indimenticabile attraverso la storia artistica, architettonica, letteraria, civile e spiriturale della Napoli sacra. Rome: Newton & Compton.
