= Castel Capuano =

Castle in Naples, Italy

- Naples, Italy
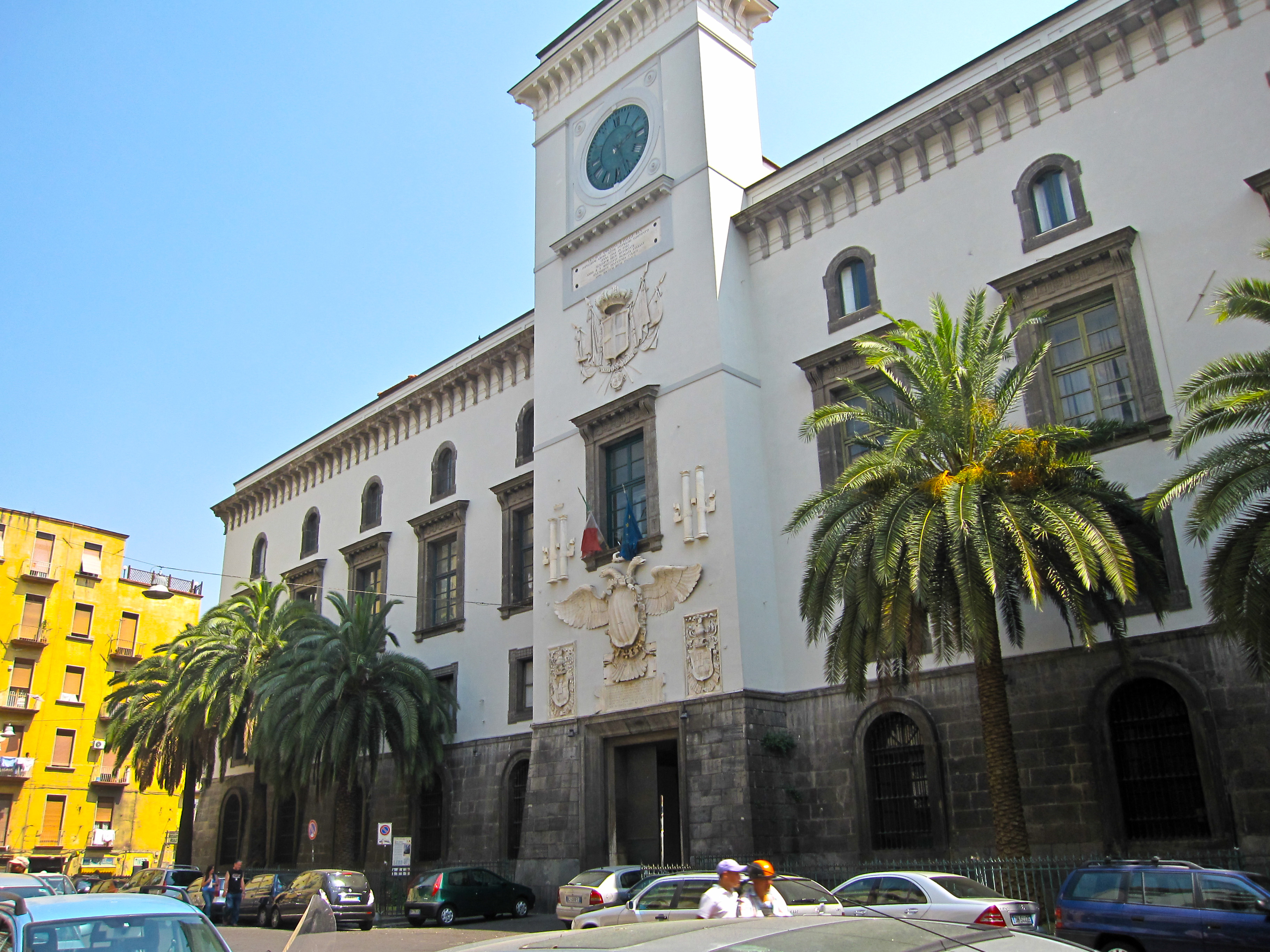
- Castel Capuano from northeast

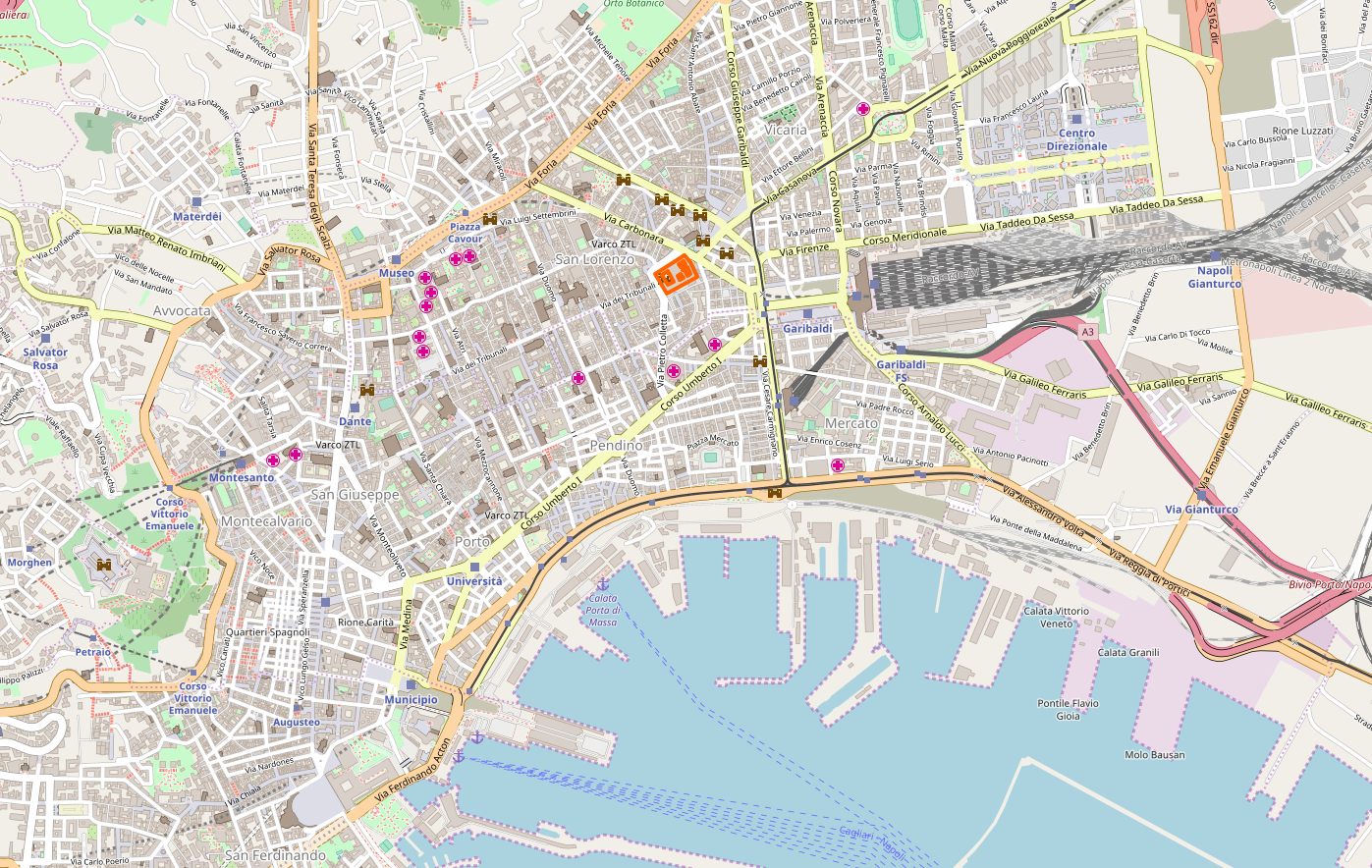

Site information
- Owner: Naples Comune
- Open to the public: Limited access, In the process of becoming a museum.

Location
- Coordinates: 40.853270°N 14.264190°E

Site history
- Built: 12th century
- Built by: William I, Frederick II
- In use: Still in use today

Castel Capuano is a castle in Naples, southern Italy. It takes its name from the fact that it was at that point in the city walls where the road led out to the city of Capua. The castle is at the southwest end of via dei Tribunali, and until recently housed the Naples Hall of Justice, which has now moved to the new Civic Center, the Centro Direzionale.

The structure was built in the 12th century by William I, the son of Roger II of Sicily, the first monarch of the Kingdom of Naples. It was expanded by Frederick II of Hohenstaufen and became one of his royal palaces. On 19 August 1432, Sergianni Caracciolo was stabbed by four knights in the service of the Queen in his room in Castel Capuano.

In the 16th century, under the Spanish viceroyship of Pedro Álvarez de Toledo, all of the city's various legal offices and departments were consolidated here and it became the Hall of Justice - known as the "Vicaria" - the basements of which served as a prison. Over the entrance to the castle, the arms of Emperor Charles V, who visited Naples in 1535, are still visible.

The castle has undergone many restorations, one as recent as 1860, and no longer retains much of its original appearance. The Colonna della Vicaria, a simple column on a pillar, once stood in front of the entrance; it was used to disgrace and punish debtors. At the rear exterior of the building, facing Piazza Enrico de Nicola, is the Fontana del Formiello.

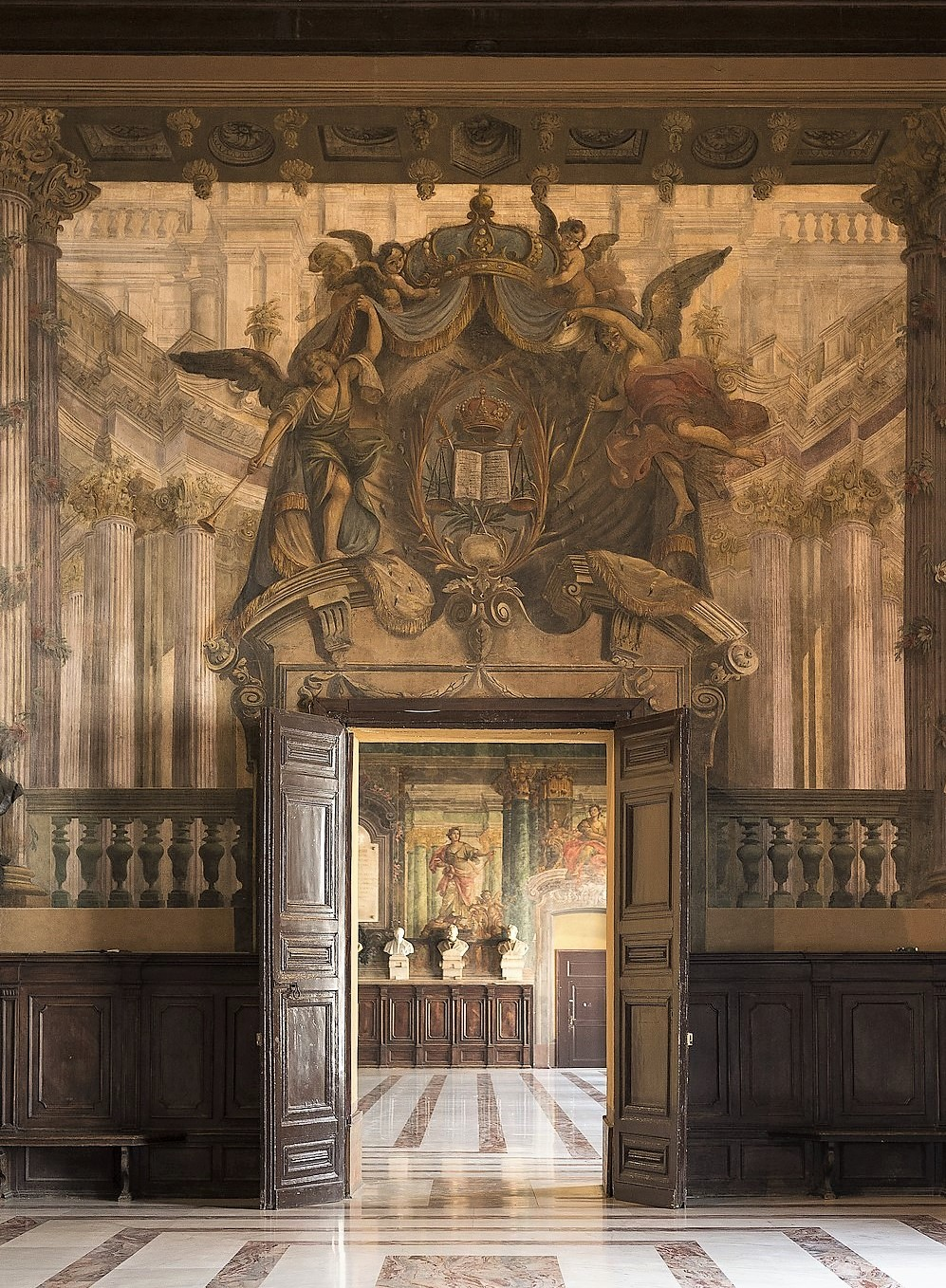
Sala dei Busti

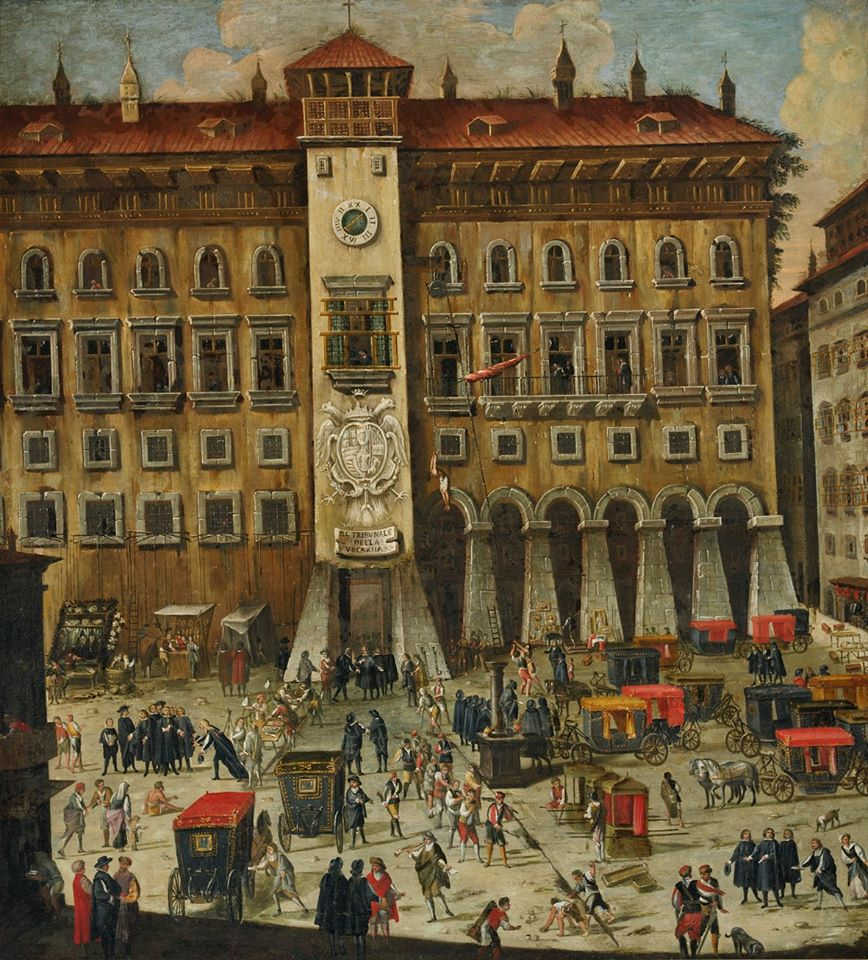
Castel Capuano in the 17th century
