= Circoscrizione =

Two different administrative units of Italy

Circoscrizione (Italian: [tʃirkoskritˈtsjoːne]; lit. 'circumscription' pl.: circoscrizioni) can refer to two different administrative units of Italy. One is an electoral district approximating to the English constituency, but typically the size of a province or region, depending on the election. The other is a subdivision of city comuni, roughly equivalent to the municipal arrondissements of Paris or the London boroughs.

== Electoral district ==
For Senate elections, there are 20 circoscrizioni corresponding to the regions of Italy.

For elections to the Chamber of Deputies, some of the regions are split in two, and Lombardy in three, to make 26 circoscrizioni.

For elections to the European Parliament, Italy is split into 5 circoscrizioni, typically of 4–5 regions joined.

Until the electoral reforms in 2005, circoscrizioni for national elections were divided into collegi uninominali which elected one deputy or Senator and thus were directly equivalent to a constituency in the British sense.

== Municipal district ==
District councils started to appear in the 1960s, but municipal circoscrizioni were formally recognised in law in 1976, and their powers extended in 1990. From 2010 they are allowed only in cities with a population of at least 250,000. Each circoscrizione now needs to have at least 30,000 residents, and typically corresponds to historic divisions of a city, but could contain multiple frazioni, località or quartieri.

The comune delegates functions to the circoscrizioni. These vary from city to city, but may include schools, social services and waste collection.

== See also ==
- Frazione
- Località
- Quartiere
- Rione
  - Rioni of Rome
- Sestiere
- Terziere
