= Castellammare Cathedral =

Coordinates: 40°41′41.5″N 14°28′49.5″E

Co-Cathedral of Saint Mary of the Assumption and Saint Catellus
- Concattedrale di Santissima Maria Assunta e San Catello (Italian)
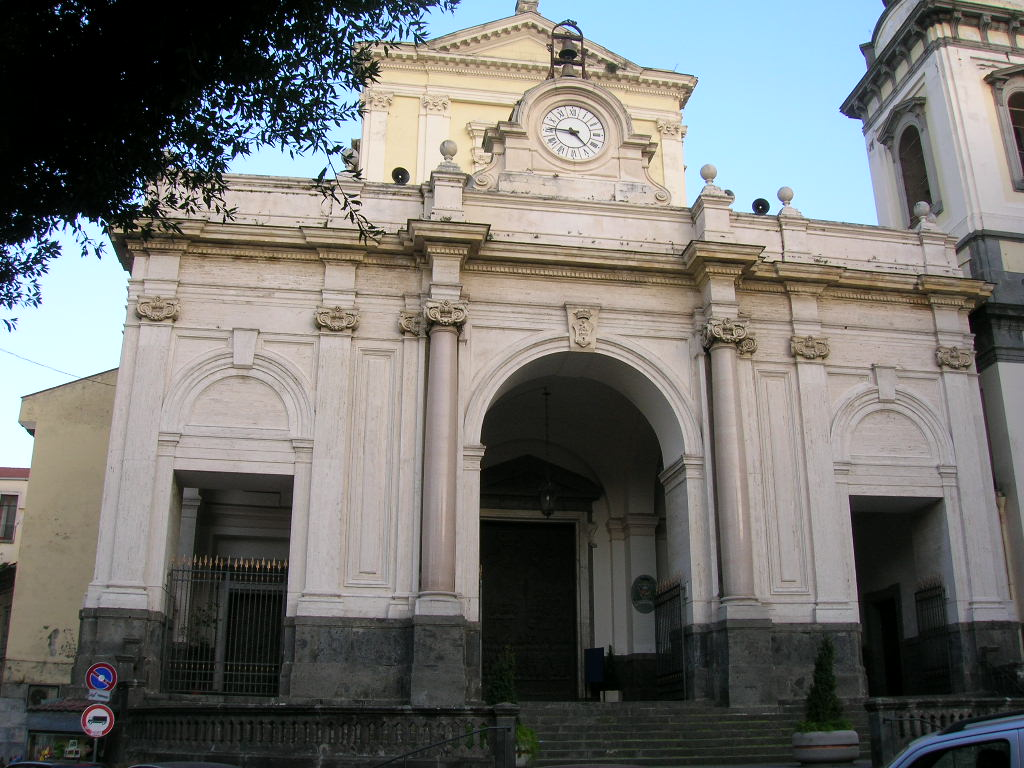
- Co-Cathedral of Saint Mary of the Assumption and Saint Catellus
- Location: Castellammare di Stabia, Campania
- Country: Italy
- Denomination: Catholic

History
- Status: Co-cathedral
- Dedication: Assumption of Mary & Catellus of Castellammare

Architecture
- Groundbreaking: 1587
- Completed: 1893

Administration
- Archdiocese: Sorrento-Castellammare di Stabia

The Co-Cathedral of Saint Mary of the Assumption and Saint Catellus (Italian: Concattedral di Maria Santissima Assunta e San Catello) is the Roman Catholic duomo or cathedral of Castellammare di Stabia in the metropolitan city of Naples, in the region of Campania, Italy. It is the main church in Castellammare di Stabia and it is co-cathedral of the Archdiocese of Sorrento-Castellammare. It was built in 1587 and was consecrated in 1893. Inside on display for worship is the statue of Saint Catello, the patron saint of the city.

== History ==
The cathedral was erected near the site of a Christian cemetery which had arisen beside the Roman road between the Ancient Roman towns of Nocera and Stabiae. The first cathedral in Castellammare was placed near the Varano hill; later it was moved near the Castle and then nearby Quartuccio square. After an earthquake in 1436, the building suffered many damages which led to the decision of building a new cathedral. There was a first attempt in 1517 when a committee of citizens assigned the task of projecting the new building to the architect Giovanni Donadio, but for unknown reasons, the plan failed. The same happened in 1569 with a second attempt by the bishop Antonio Laureo.

In 1581 the bishop Ludovico Maiorano sold the co-cathedral, henceforth fallen into ruin, and earned a fair amount of money to invest into the construction of the new cathedral. Six years later, the city administration gave its permission subsidizing the project with a tax that every citizen had to pay for every kilogram of meat, oil, cheese and every other foodstuff bought in the city shops or in the Royal Customs. The new co-cathedral stood on the ruins of the former in Quartuccio zone, and the construction works were assigned to Pietro Antonio De Sanctis, Santoro Cortolano, and Paolo Fasano (the cornerstone laying ceremony is told in one of the books kept in the cathedral's historic archive). The construction was quite difficult and slow; the economic funds were not enough despite the taxes imposed on the citizens. Finally, in 1643, the building was partially opened to the public thanks to the private chapels that were granted to some noble families of the city. The cathedral was not complete in that period, and important elements were absent such as the organ (completely placed in 1774), the hall (built in 1713), and the main altar (consecrated in 1760). The bell tower was absent too, and in 1774 it was proposed to renovate the tower still existing. The bishop strongly opposed this because he would have had to give about 2 meters of his land, so in 1782 the king intervened and a new bell tower was built with an expense of 7,323 ducats.

=== 19th century additions ===
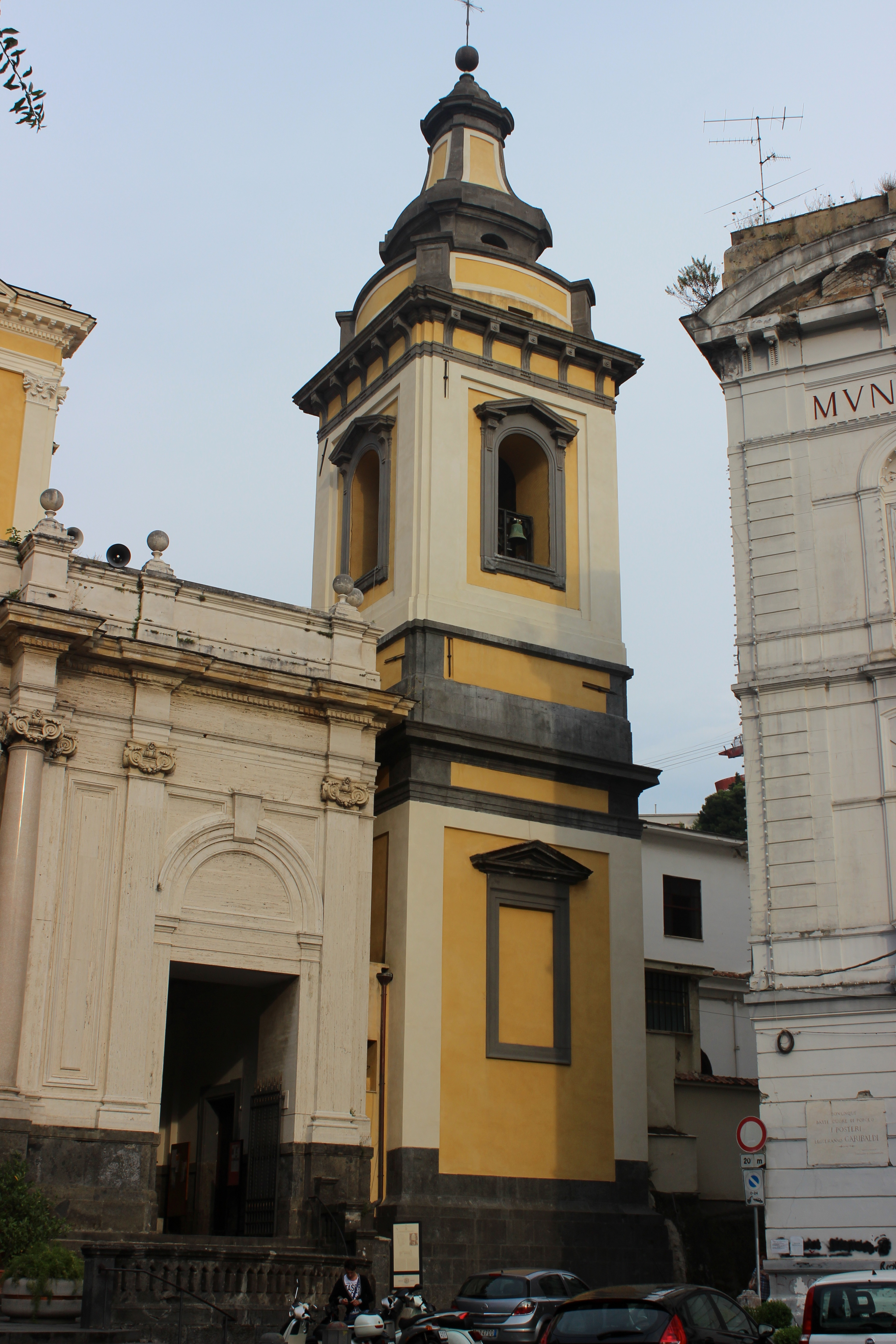
Bell tower attached to the church

Between 1875 and 1893 the cathedral was completely transformed because of the Bishop Petagna. The plan took the shape of a Latin cross, and the transept and presbytery were built together with the chapel for San Catello. During the excavations of the patron saint's chapel, workers discovered the rest of a Paleochristian necropolis, segments of streets, and doors belonging to ancient Roman homes. This place was named Area Christianorum. The chapel contains a statue (1609) of the patron saint and a 3rd-4th-century sarcophagus from the Paleochristian cemetery. In 1893 the building was solemnly consecrated by Bishop Sarnelli and dedicated to Maria Santissima Assunta.

The Chapel of San Catello, dedicated to the patron of the town, was begun in 1875 and completed in 1893 when Bishop Vincenzo Sarnelli reconsecrated the cathedral. The chapel contains a statue (1609) of the patron saint and a 3rd-4th century sarcophagus from the paleo-Christian cemetery. During Christmas, it houses a life-size presepe, or nativity scene, completed during the 19th and 20th centuries. It consists of nearly 80 elements, including painted and clothed wooden statues. Assembly of the presepe statues began circa 1840, with statues by the studio of Giuseppe and Francesco Verzella made for the church of San Ferdinando, Naples. Some of those statues were moved with the bishop to this church; others were made locally.

Further refurbishments to the church occurred in the 19th century. A wooden choir structure from the Monastery once attached to the Chiesa della Pace was introduced. The bronze entrance doors were sculpted in 1983 by Antonio Berti.

Inside the church are paintings by the studio of Giuseppe Ribera, a copy of a Caravaggio altarpiece, and paintings by Vincenzo da Forli, Giovanni Battista Spinelli, Nunzio Rossi, Giuseppe Marullo, Giuseppe Bonito, and Giacinto Diano. The church has a marble ciborium (1518), attributed to Andrea da Fiesole, and a statue of the Archangel St. Michael attributed to the studio of Francesco Laurana.

== Architecture ==
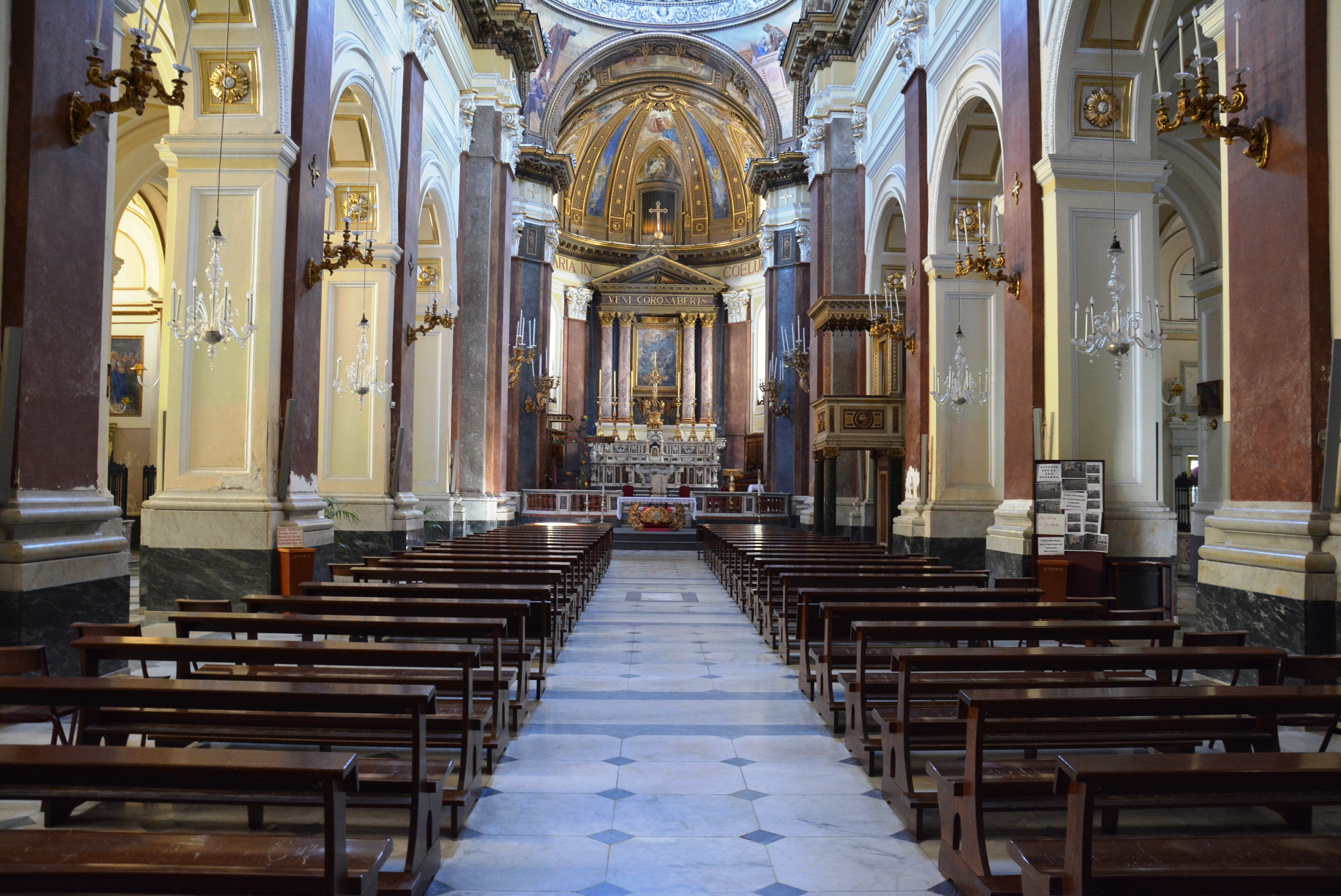
View of the nave toward the altar

The co-cathedral's facade, decorated with marbles, is opened by three arches leaning on four pillars creating a small entrance hall that you can reach from a large staircase made of a rock called “piperno of Soccavo”. The central arch is bigger than the others, and it is inset between two columns with capitals with the municipal coat of arms on its top. On the facade, there is also a clock with two small bells. The entrance to the church is enabled by three bronze doors created by the Florentine sculptor Antonio Berti, which were given as a present in 1985 by the Bank of Stabia. The central door is bigger and has more decorative elements than the other two.

The church of Maria Santissima Assunta is a basilica with a Latin cross shape. The inside is divided into three aisles, a nave, and two smaller side aisles on which five chapels open up. The pavement is made of black and grey marbles, squared and octagonal, and in the center of the nave there is the ancient stabian priests' grave. The nave is separated from the side aisles by five arcades for each side, leaning on ten pillars made of piperno and decorated with plasters, medallions, and gilding. The vault is painted with three frescoes by Vincenzo Paliotti, dating 1983, portraying scenes of Saint Catello's life: 1) In Rome's prisons where the saint received Saint Gregorio Magno's visit, 2) Saint Catello freed from prison, 3) His return to Castellammare (the biggest painting). Ten lunettes representing the virtues of the patron saint's life surround the paintings: Reliability, Constancy, Zeal, Long-suffering, Forgiveness, Charity, Prayer, Faith, Love, and Hope.

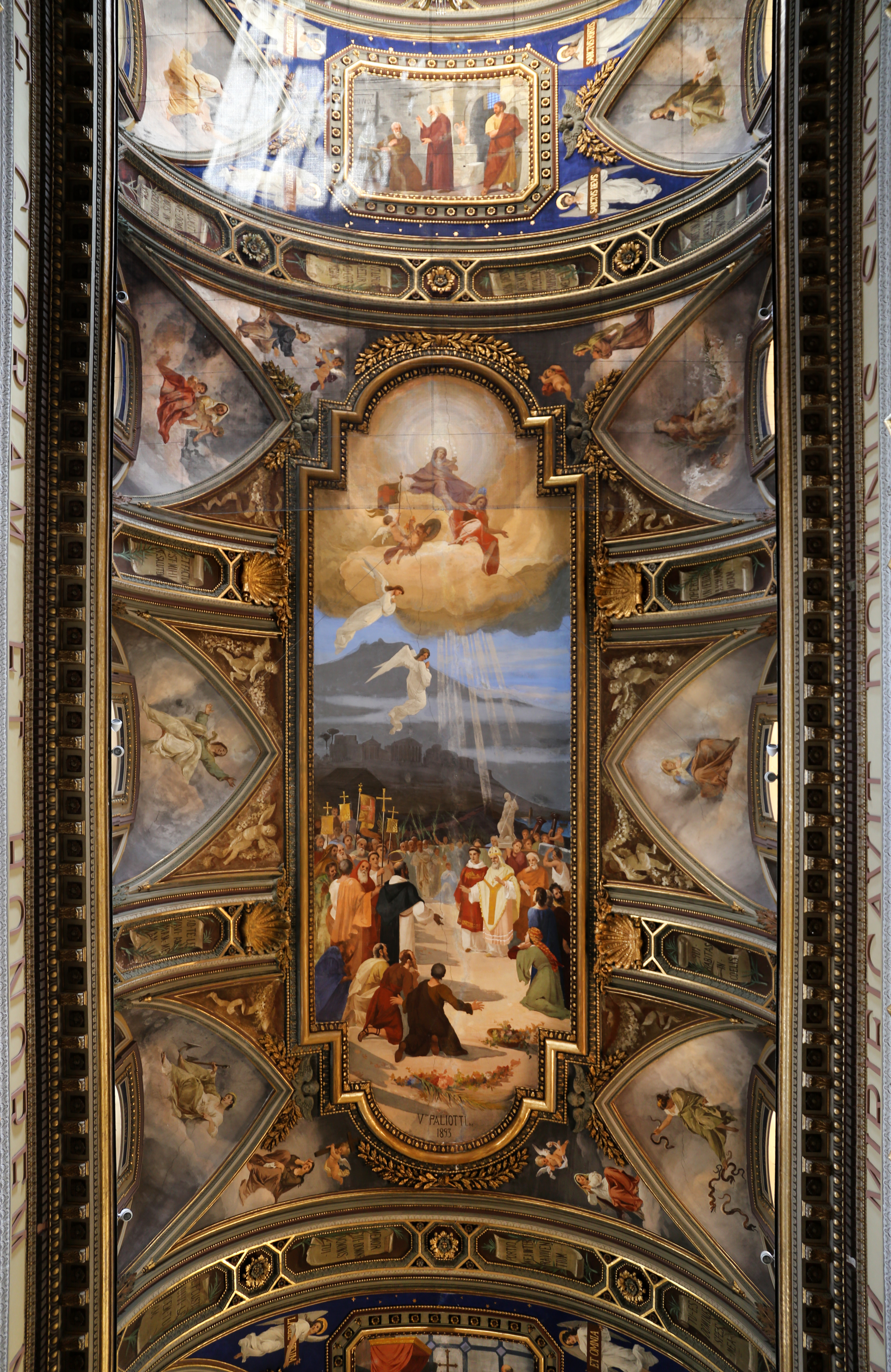
Ceiling above the nave

In the left aisle, there are five chapels. First, there is the chapel of Baptism, named after the marble baptismal font there placed. In this chapel, there is a paleo-Christian marble pillar found during the excavation for Saint Catello's chapel. Second, there is the chapel of the Blessed Virgin from Lourdes, formerly dedicated to Saint Gaetano and now dedicated to the Blessed Virgin of Lourdes. On the main altar is displayed a reproduction in stucco and cork of the Grotto of Apparitions with the statues of Virgin Mary and Saint Bernadette in prayer. Third, there is the chapel of Madonna del Carmine, formerly dedicated to Saint Michael the Archangel. On the main altar, there is a painting by Angelo Mozzillo, dating 1793, of the Virgin freeing the souls from Purgatory. Fourth, there is the Saint Francesco of Sales' chapel with the saint's wooden statue and portraits. Fifth, there is the Holy Crucifix's chapel, named after a wooden crucifix dating back the XVII century. In this chapel, there is the door that leads to the sacristy.

In the right aisle, there are also five chapels. First, there is the chapel of Saint Nicola where a statue of Saint Nicola of Mira is displayed. Second, there is the chapel of the Rosary, where a portrait of the Virgin of the Rosary (painted by an anonymous artist) is displayed. Third, there is the Holy Family chapel where there is a composition, dating back to the 18th century, of three statues portraying Saint Anna, Saint Gioacchino, and the child Mary. There is also a portrait of Saint Filippo Neri. Fourth, there is the chapel of the Immaculate Conception, named after the wooden statue portraying the Immaculate Conception. There are several works portraying the Virgin Mary's life. Fifth, there is the chapel of Saint Catello, which is bigger than the other four. It was built in 1789 and it replaced the chapel of the Crucifix. There are two bronze tombstones commemorating the eruption of the Vesuvius in 1906 and a flood that hit the city in 1764. The chapel is decorated with frescoes by Paolo Amato.

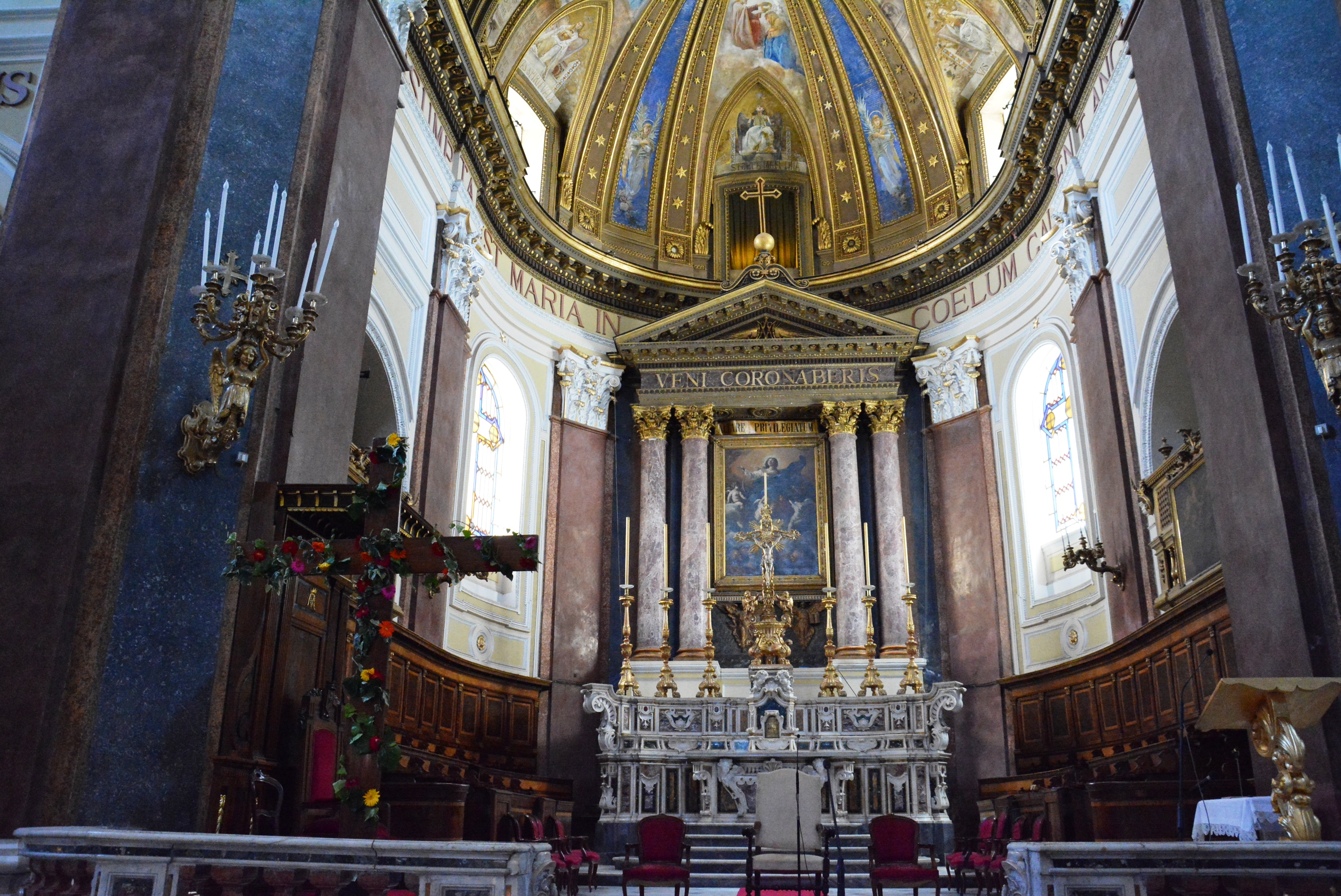
View of the chancel

The cathedral's crossing is divided into right side and left side, each with two chapels. The left side is dedicated to Jesus' Sacred Heart and there is a wooden statue, dating back the end of 19th century, where Jesus wears a blue robe and a light blue cloak. On his chest, there is the Sacred Heart enfolded in flames. On the left side there are the Blessed Sacrament chapel and the Ara Pacis chapel. The first has an octagonal shape and it was completely renovated in 1996. The second was built between 1924 and 1928 and it was originally dedicated to the Immaculate Conception. The main theme in this chapel is the memory of those who died in World War I. There are six marble memorial stones engraved with all the names of the soldiers from Stabia fallen during the war. Four helmets, six muskets, two cartridges, and one cannon from World War I lie near the altar. The chapel also has a votive lamp made by the shipyard workers hanging from the ceiling.

The crossing's right side is dedicated to Saint Joseph. Its two chapels are dedicated to Saint Michael the Archangel and to the Virgin of the Plagues. The first has an octagonal shape and on its main altar is the marble statue of the Saint Archangel (the one previously positioned in the church on Mount Faito). The statue appears to be of medieval origins, but according to the traditional story, Pope Gregorio Magno gave it to Saint Catello in the 6th century. The main altar is made of bronze and colored marbles, and below there is the sarcophagus of the Good Shepherd of Early Christian origin (also found during the excavation). On the sidewalls, there are two cross-shaped reliquaries created in 1882. On its top is the painting of the Assumption of the Virgin by Nunzio Rossi, dating back to the 18th century. On the canvas seven apostles are portrayed, four looking into the empty tomb and three looking at the Virgin on her cloud, surrounded by putti and cherubs. On the wall at the cathedral's end, there is a funerary monument with a sculpture of Tommaso Angelo d'Arco's face and three marble graves. The first commemorates the visit of Pope Pio IX to the city on 22 October 1849, the second is dedicated to the renovation works endowed by the Bishop Giuseppe Coppola in 1760, and the third is dedicated to the expansion works done between 1887 and 1893. On the same wall, on a loft held by four columns, there is the organ. On its sides, there are two paintings, one portraying Abraham, the other Noah. The cupola leans on four pillars creating four huge arches; on it, the sixteen major prophets are portrayed. On the inside of the cupola, there is an image of the Apocalypse with the four evangelists: Saint Matteo with the angel, Saint Luca with the ox, Saint Giovanni with the eagle, and Saint Marco with the lion. There are also the portraits of the bishops who have celebrated the Glory of the Virgin Mary during their lives.
