= El Gesù, Castellammare di Stabia =

Church building in Castellammare di Stabia, Italy

Coordinates: 41.895951°N 12.479854°E

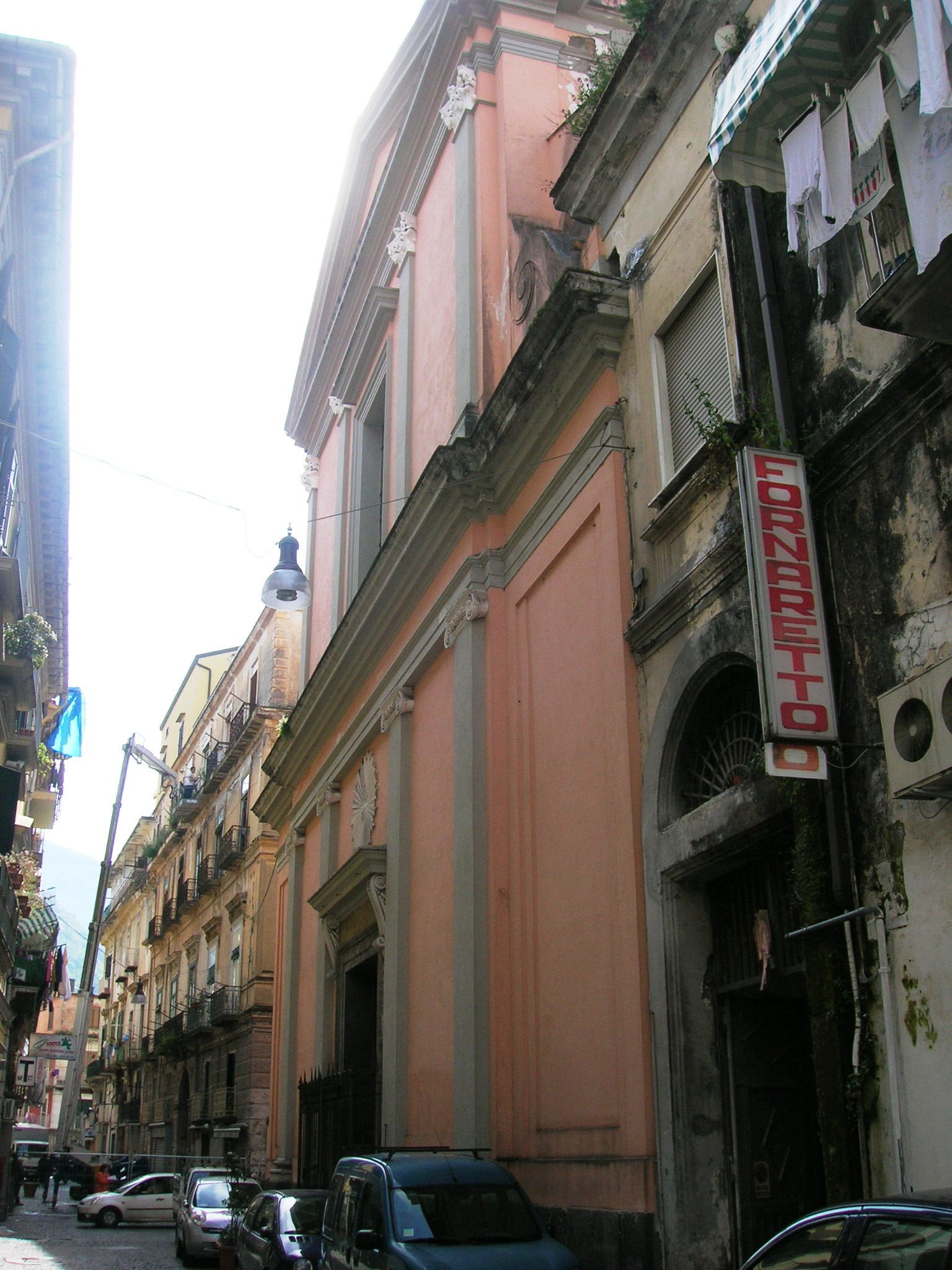
Chiesa di Gesù e Maria 1.jpg

The Chiesa del Gesù (Church of the Jesus) is a baroque-style, Roman Catholic church located on Strada Gesù #11 in Castellammare di Stabia, in the metropolitan city of Naples, region of Campania, Italy.

== History ==
Construction of the church was commissioned by the Jesuit order in 1609. The order had arrived in town the year before to open a school. Construction began on the church in 1614, and was completed by 1615 with the patronage of the town and the aristocratic family of Pier Giovanni di Nocera. The design was by the Jesuits Pietro Provedi and later Agazio Stoia.

When the Jesuits were expelled from the Kingdom of Naples in 1767, the church and school were assigned to the Order of the Clero dei Preti Semplici. In 1785, an image of the Madonna del Carmelo from a church of the Carmelite order was moved to the church.

The façade has two coats of arms, sculpted by Giuseppe Filosa: that of the city and of the order of the clerics.

The interior houses an altarpiece depicting St Ignatius and St Francis Xavier receiving orders of their mission from Pope Paul III by Paolo de Matteis. To the right of the entrance is another Matteis work depicting the Holy Family and Saints Aloysius Gonzaga and Stanislaus Kostka. The main altarpiece is a Beata Vergine del Rifugio (also called the Vergine del Soccorso or Virgin of the Succor), by Luca Giordano. The main altar, made of polychrome marble and attributed to the studio of Giuseppe Sanmartino, was originally made for the church of the Annunziata of Angri, and moved here in 1812.

The ceiling is painted with a depiction of the Triumph of the Name of Jesus (1899) by Vincenzo Galloppi. He also painted the Sermon of the Mount and Supper of the Angels (1895) found in the apse.

The church also has six 18th-century canvases depicting angels by Angelo Mozzillo. The church also houses a processional Macchina da festa, used during the feast of the Santissimo Sacramento (Holy Sacrament).

The library of the church was donated to the Biblioteca dell'Istituto Superiore di Scienze Religiose Monsignor Raffaele Pellecchia of the town.
