= San Bartolomeo, Castellammare di Stabia =

Church building in Castellammare di Stabia, Italy

Coordinates: 40°41′36.1″N 14°28′41.79″E

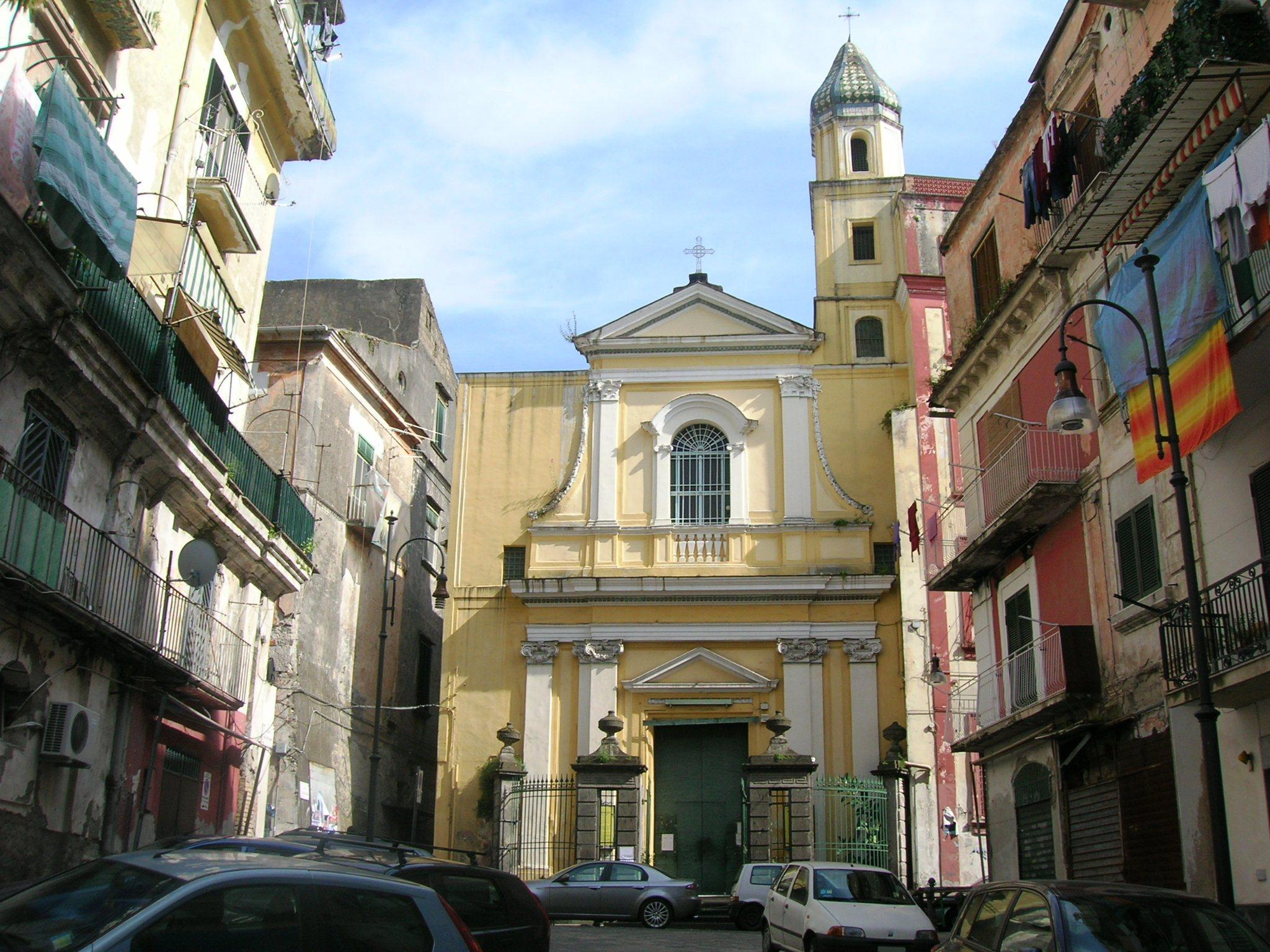
The facade of the church

San Bartolomeo (St Bartholemew) is a baroque-style, Roman Catholic church located on Strada del Gesù in Castellammare di Stabia, in the metropolitan city of Naples, region of Campania, Italy.

== History ==
A Clarissan convent, dedicated to St Bartholemew, once was located where today stands the Santuario della Sanità and the Villa Pellicano. The convent dated to prior to 1189. However, in the mid-16th century, the conclusions of the Council of Trent demanded for female convents to be located within city walls. Thus in 1583, the nuns moved to this new location. Construction was dilatory, and the church was not completed until 1673. It was refurbished in the 18th century. An atrium and chancel were added to the front, designed by Catello Troiano, with work completed in 1821.

The convent was suppressed during the 19th century; and in 1924, the convent was ceded to the order of Suore Adoratrici perpetue.

The church was restored in the 1970s, and has a single nave with cupola. Among the altarpieces is a canvas depicting the Torture of St Bartholemew (1782) by Francesco Landini, donated by the Queen Maria Carolina of Bourbon. There is an Immaculate Conception by Giuseppe Bonito, a Madonna and Child with San Ludovico by followers of Francesco Solimena; a Redeemer with Virgin with Franciscan Saints. The church has a 14th-century crucifix in the second chapel on the left.
