= Santa Caterina, Castellammare di Stabia =

Church building in Castellammare di Stabia, Italy

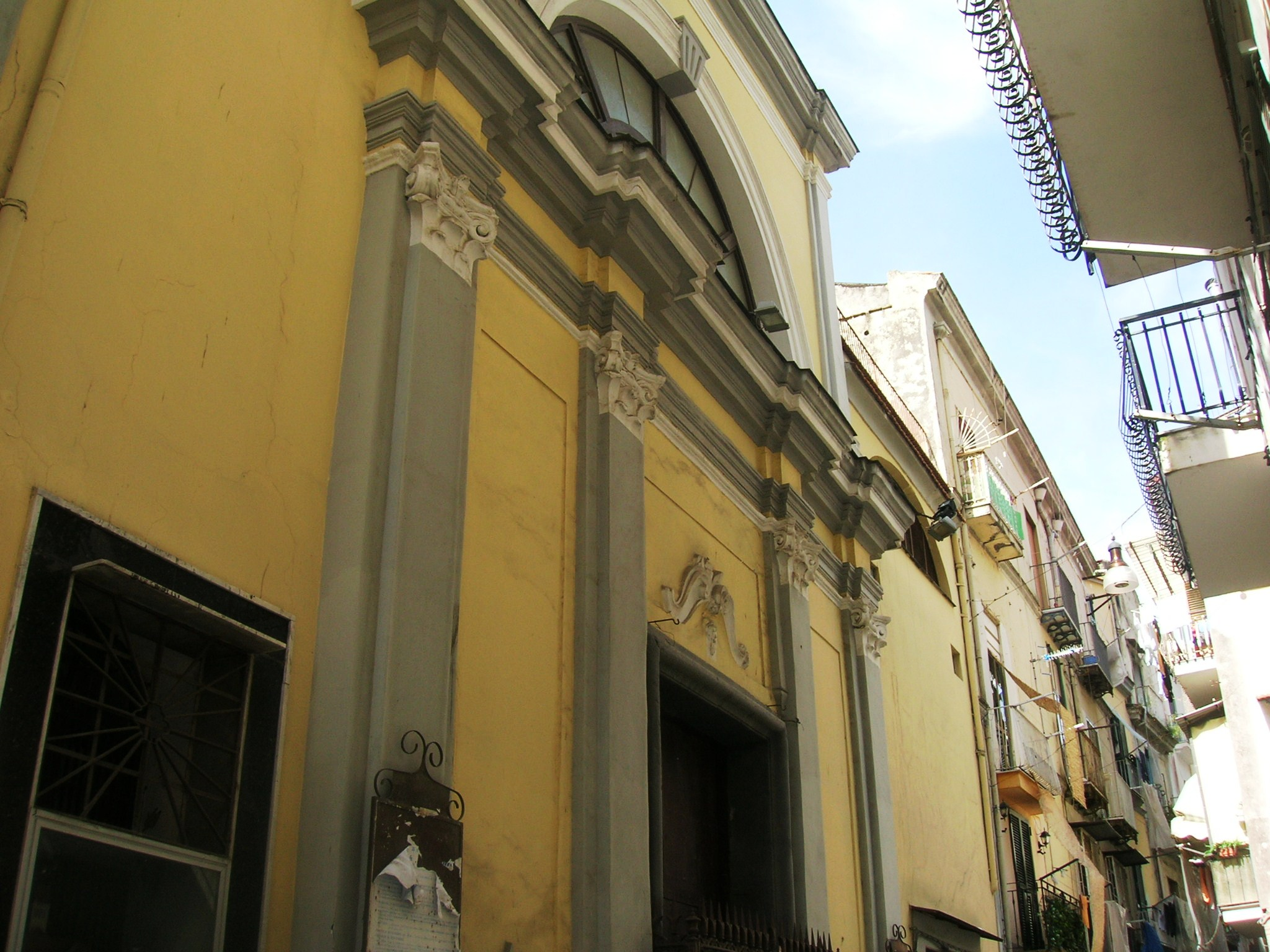
Chiesa di Santa Caterina d'Alessandria 1.jpg

Santa Caterina is a Roman Catholic church located on Via Santa Caterina #38 in Castellammare di Stabia, in the metropolitan city of Naples, region of Campania, Italy.

== History ==
A church or oratory of the same name is documented by 1447 in Scanzano, in what is now via Carmine Apuzzo. The building at this site, home of the confraternity above, was linked to the city hospital. By 1585, it was linked to a Monte della Pietà, or bank, raising funds to ransom Christians captured by Saracens. The present church at the site was only consecrated in 1809. It contains a Romanesque-style crypt dating to 1385, rebuilt in 1754.

The interiors are decorated with 18th-century wooden statues depicting St Catherine of Alexandria, St Joseph, and St Judas Thaddeus, carved by the studio of the brothers Giuseppe and Francesco Verzella. The Chapel of the Resurrection (1725) has two 18th-century canvases, one depicting St Catherine saved by Archangel Michael from the martyrdom of the wheel by Ludovico Mazzanti; and the other, a Pietà by Giuseppe Bonito. The church until 1931 was used to celebrate a mass for each new naval ship, to invoke the patronage and protection of St Joseph. The façade has symbols of the dead, from when the church was used as a funeral chapel.
