= Giuseppe Astarita =

Italian architect and engineer

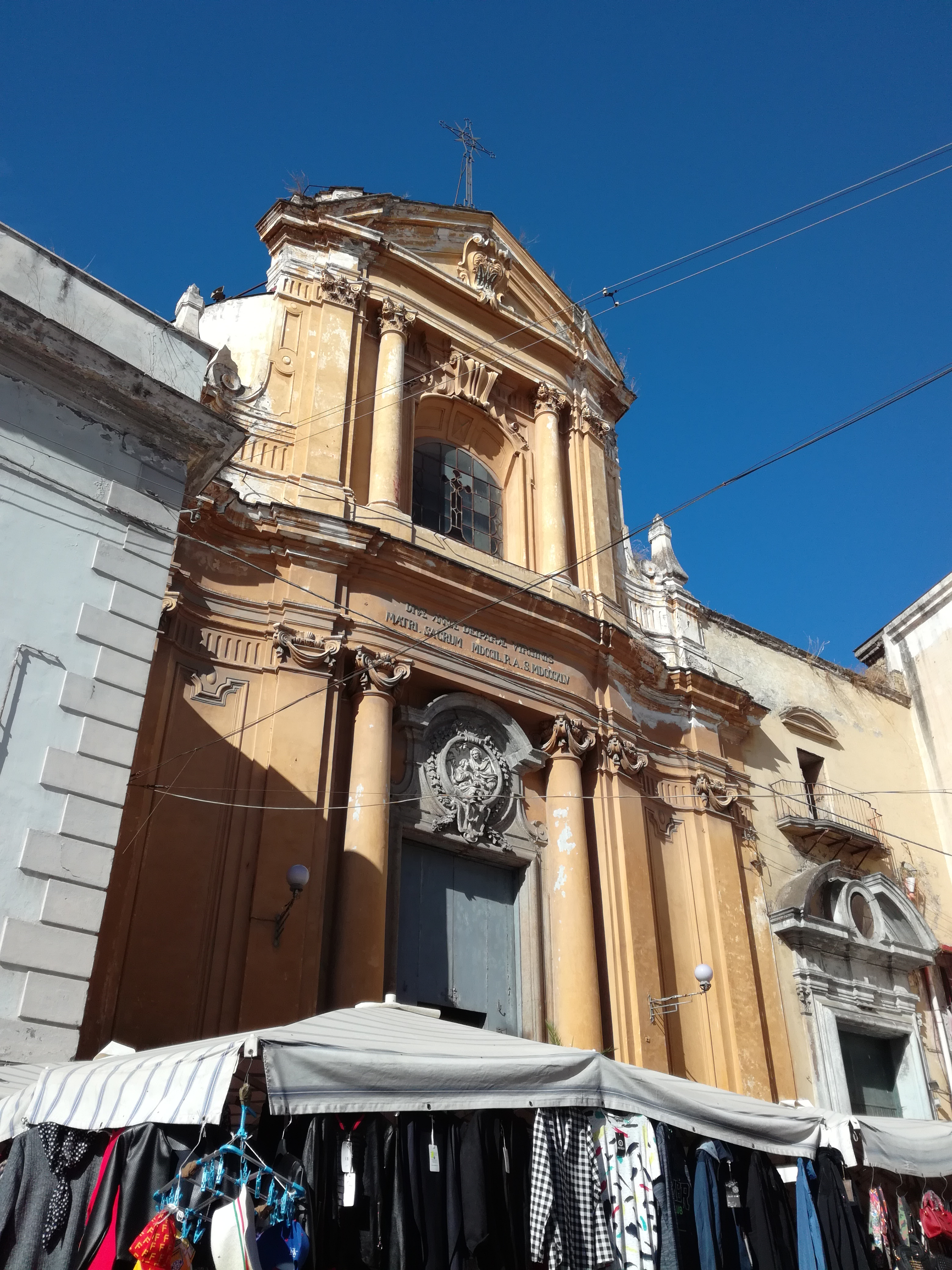
Church of Sant'Anna a Capuana

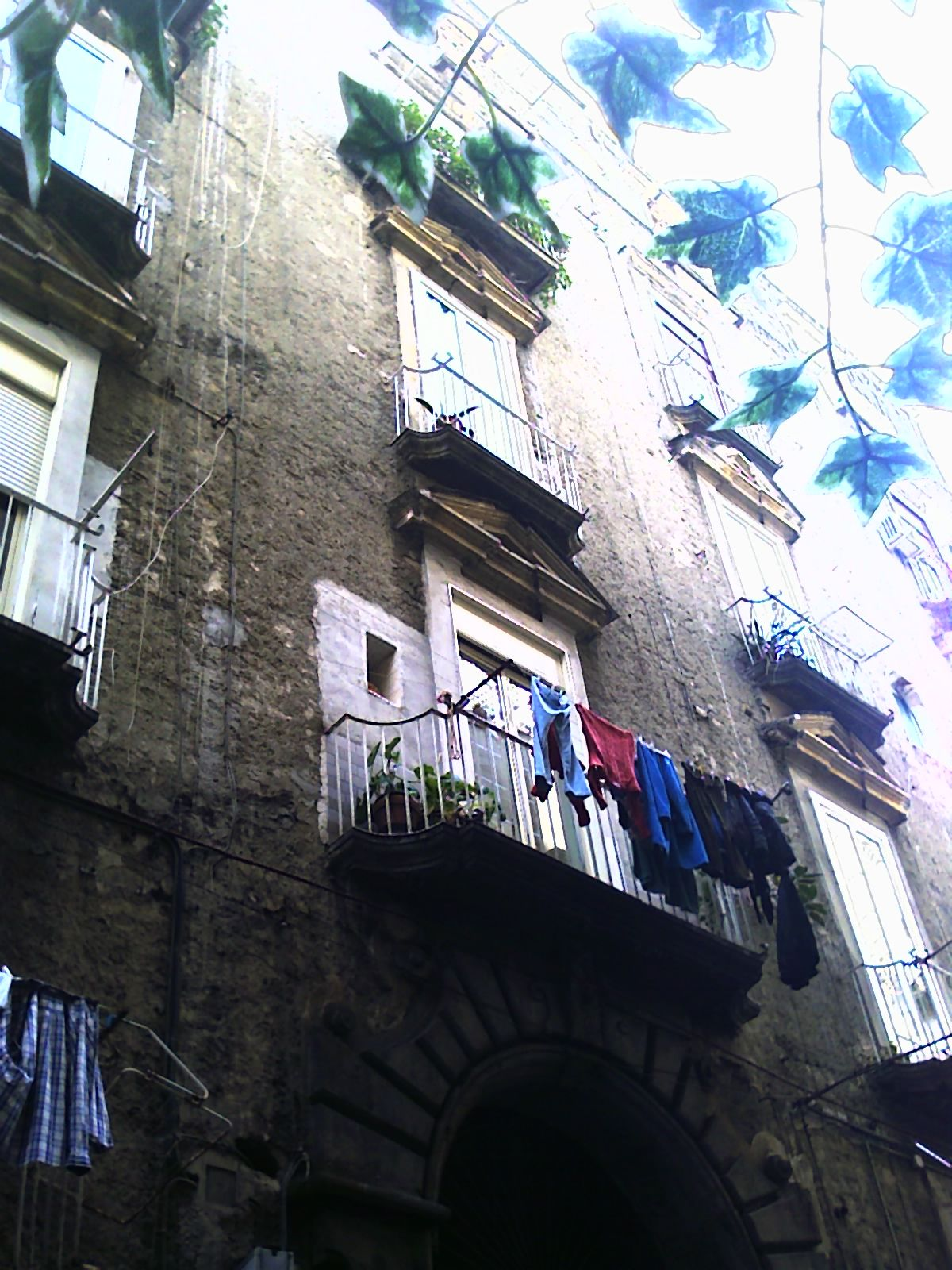
Palace on via Materdei n. 20

Giuseppe Astarita (Naples, 1707 – Naples, 1775) was an Italian architect and engineer of the late-Baroque or Rococo period. He was a pupil of Domenico Antonio Vaccaro and collaborated with Ferdinando Sanfelice; his style is influenced by Guarino Guarini. He worked on the following buildings, sometimes in work of reconstruction.

== Works ==
- Church of San Lorenzo delle Benedettine in Foggia
- Church of San Pietro Martire
- Church of Sant'Anna a Capuana
- Church of San Raffaele
- Palazzo di Sangro di Casacalenda, Naples
- Church of Sant'Eustachio (Chiesa dell'Annunziata) and Church of Cappucini, Sessa Aurunca
- Church of Santa Maria delle Graziedi di Melito, Province of Naples
- Restoration of Torre Annunziata, Naples
- Restorations of Church of Gesù Nuovo, Naples
- Facade of Basilica of San Paolo Maggiore
- Palazzo in via Materdei (number 20).

== Bibliography ==
- Boni, Filippo de' (1840). Biografia degli artisti ovvero dizionario della vita e delle opere dei pittori, degli scultori, degli intagliatori, dei tipografi e dei musici di ogni nazione che fiorirono da'tempi più remoti sino á nostri giorni. Seconda Edizione. Venice; Googlebooks: Presso Andrea Santini e Figlio. p. 43.
