= Catellus of Castellammare =

9th-century Italian bishop

Saint Catellus of Castellammare
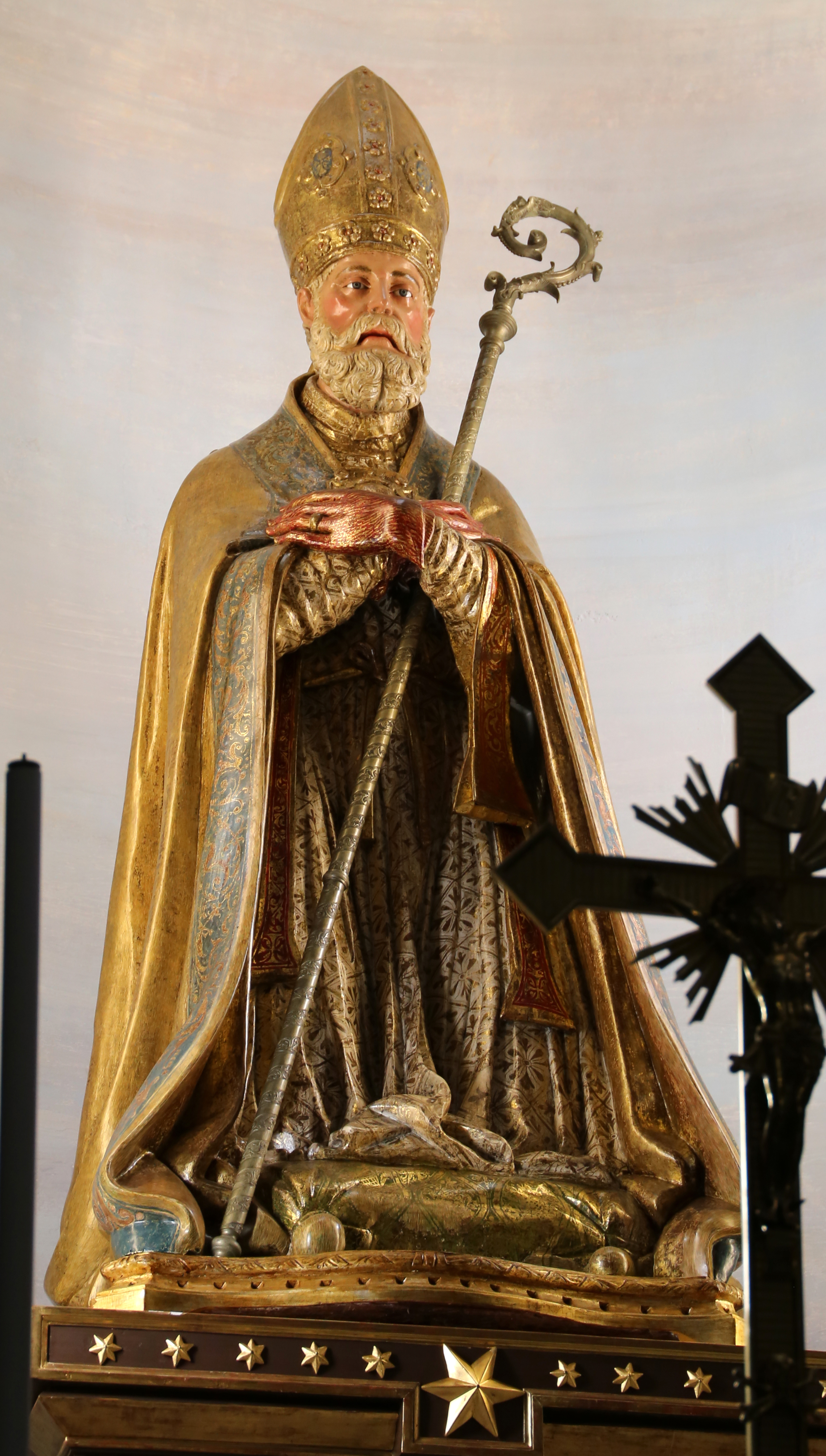
- Died: 9th century
- Venerated in: Roman Catholic Church; Eastern Orthodox Church
- Canonized: cultus confirmed in 1729 (C)
- Feast: January 19
- Patronage: city and diocese of Castellamare di Stabia

Saint Catellus of Castellamare (Italian: San Catello) (9th century) was a bishop of Castellamare di Stabia. He was a close friend of Saint Antoninus of Sorrento. Tradition states that Antoninus, fleeing the Lombard invasions, headed for Campania where he ended up at Castellammare di Stabia. Here Catellus was bishop but wishing to become a hermit, gave up his office as bishop and entrusted Antoninus with the task of serving as the town's bishop. Catellus withdrew to Monte Aureo.

The desire to remain a hermit himself led Antoninus to convince Catellus to return to his see. Antoninus retired to Monte Aureo himself and lived in a natural grotto. However, Catellus again decided to withdraw to this mountain and dedicate himself only sporadically to the cares of his diocese.

An apparition of Saint Michael is said to have convinced the two to construct the stone oratory now known as Monte San Angelo or Punta San Michele.

Subsequently, Catellus was accused of witchcraft by a priest named Tibeius (Tibeio) of Stabia and was held captive at Rome until a new pope released him. Catellus returned to Stabia and dedicated himself to expanding the church that he had helped found.

Inhabitants of Sorrento, meanwhile, convinced Antoninus to settle at Sorrento. Antoninus became an abbot of the Benedictine monastery of San Agrippino, succeeding Boniface (Bonifacio) in this capacity.

== Veneration ==
Details of his life are based on an account written towards the end of the ninth century by an anonymous chronicler. His life is also mentioned in those sources describing that of his friend Antoninus. The Theatine father Antonio Caracciolo edited one of these in 1626.

The cult of this saint was confirmed by the Sacred Congregation on September 13, 1729.

A Chapel of San Catello is found in the Castellammare Cathedral.
