= Chiesa del Purgatorio, Castellammare di Stabia =

Roman Catholic Church in Naples, Italy

Coordinates: 40.69416°N 14.47928°E

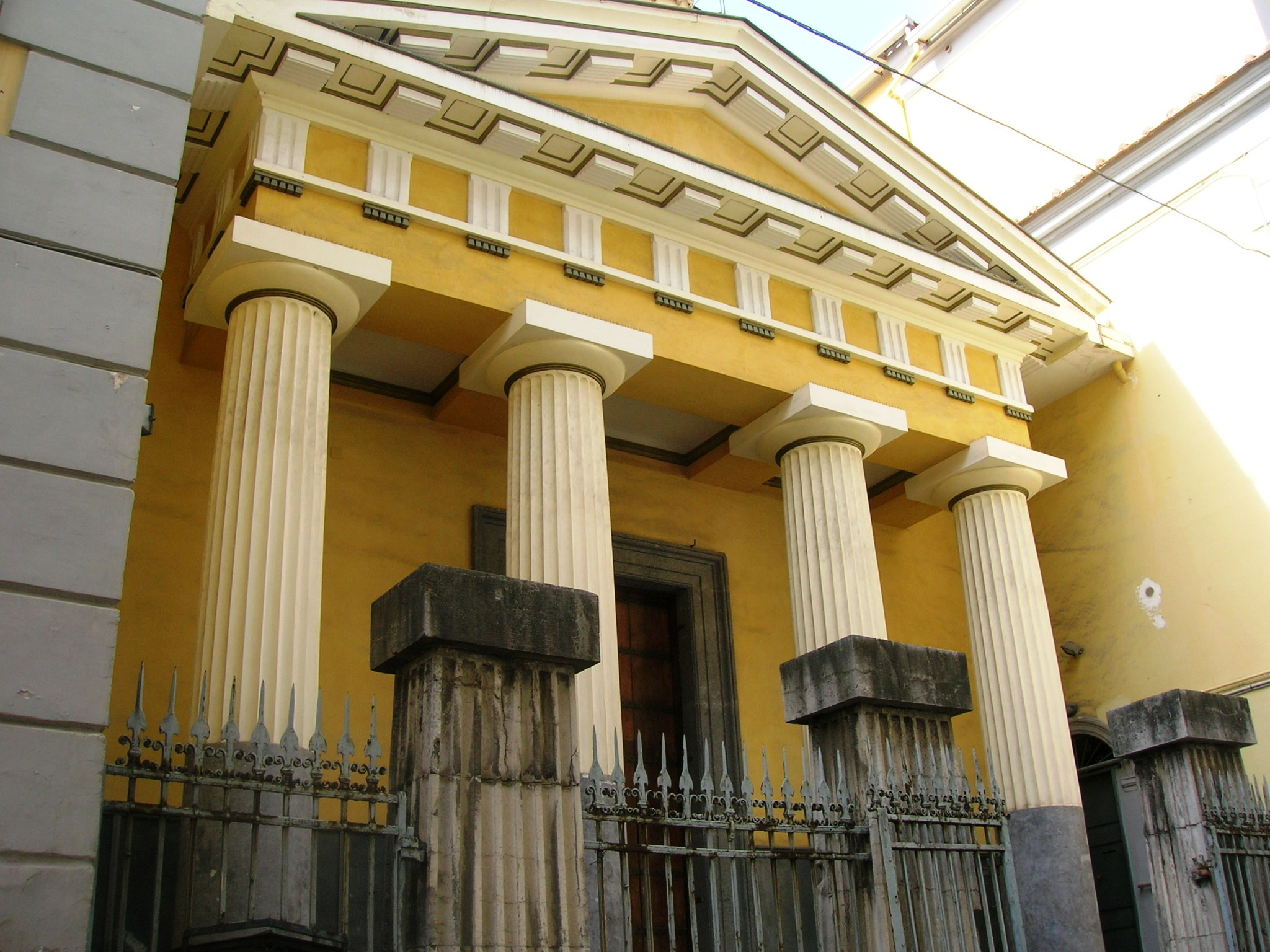

The Chiesa del Santissimo Crocifisso e Anime Sante del Purgatorio (Church of the Very Holy Crucifix and Holy Souls of Purgatory), known in general as the Chiesa del Purgatorio, is a neoclassical-style, Roman Catholic church located on Strada Gesù #20 in Castellammare di Stabia, in the metropolitan city of Naples, region of Campania, Italy.

== History ==
The church was built between 1795 and 1802 by design of the architect Antonio Ciofi, with a Greek cross layout, and a façade with a portico of ionic columns. The church was commissioned by a local confraternity. The crossing has a small dome, whose exterior is decorated with yellow and green maiolica tiles.

The nave is separated by 12 columns from the two aisles. Two lateral altars have canvases depicting the Madonna del Carmelo and the Archangel Raphael. The main altar is meant to represent the empty tomb of the Virgin of the Assumption, and is surmounted by a wooden statue (prior to 1823) of that Marian icon. The work is attributed to the studio of Francesco and Giuseppe Verzella. Another icon in the church, depicting St. Anne and the child Mary is also attributed to the same artists.

In the oratory of the confraternity, is a canvas depicting Madonna del Buon Consiglio, Santa Lucia, and an Immaculate Conception (circa 1835) by Lorenzo Giusti.
