= Sant'Anna a Capuana =

Church of Sant'Anna a Capuana
- Chiesa di Sant'Anna a Capuana
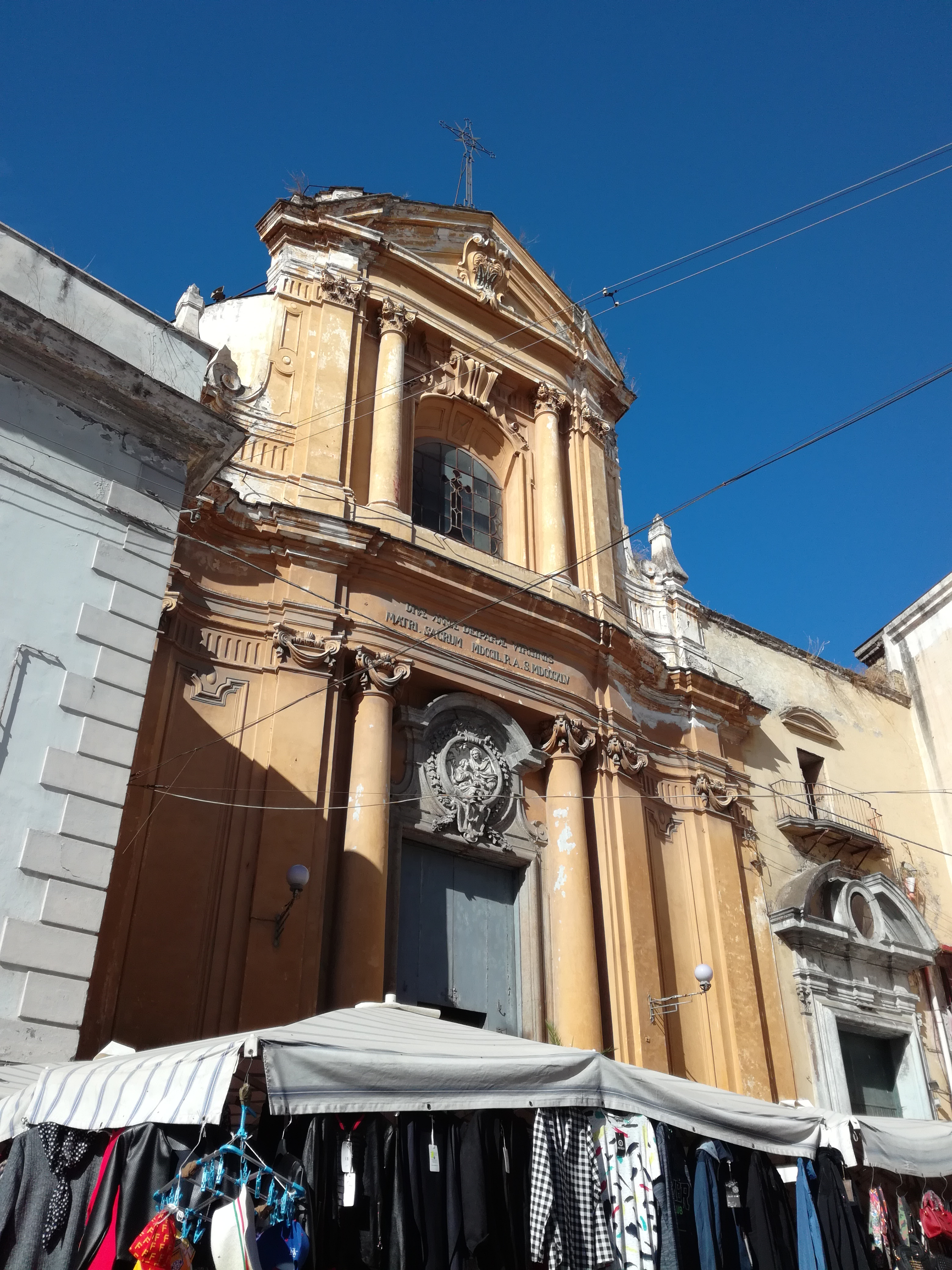
- Façade of Sant'Anna a Capuana.
- Church of Sant'Anna a Capuana
- 40.855741°N 14.265420°E
- Location: Naples; Province of Naples, Campania
- Country: Italy
- Denomination: Roman Catholic

History
- Status: Active

Architecture
- Architectural type: Church
- Style: Baroque architecture

Administration
- Diocese: Roman Catholic Archdiocese of Naples

Sant'Anna a Capuana is a church located on the piazza of the same name in Naples, Italy.

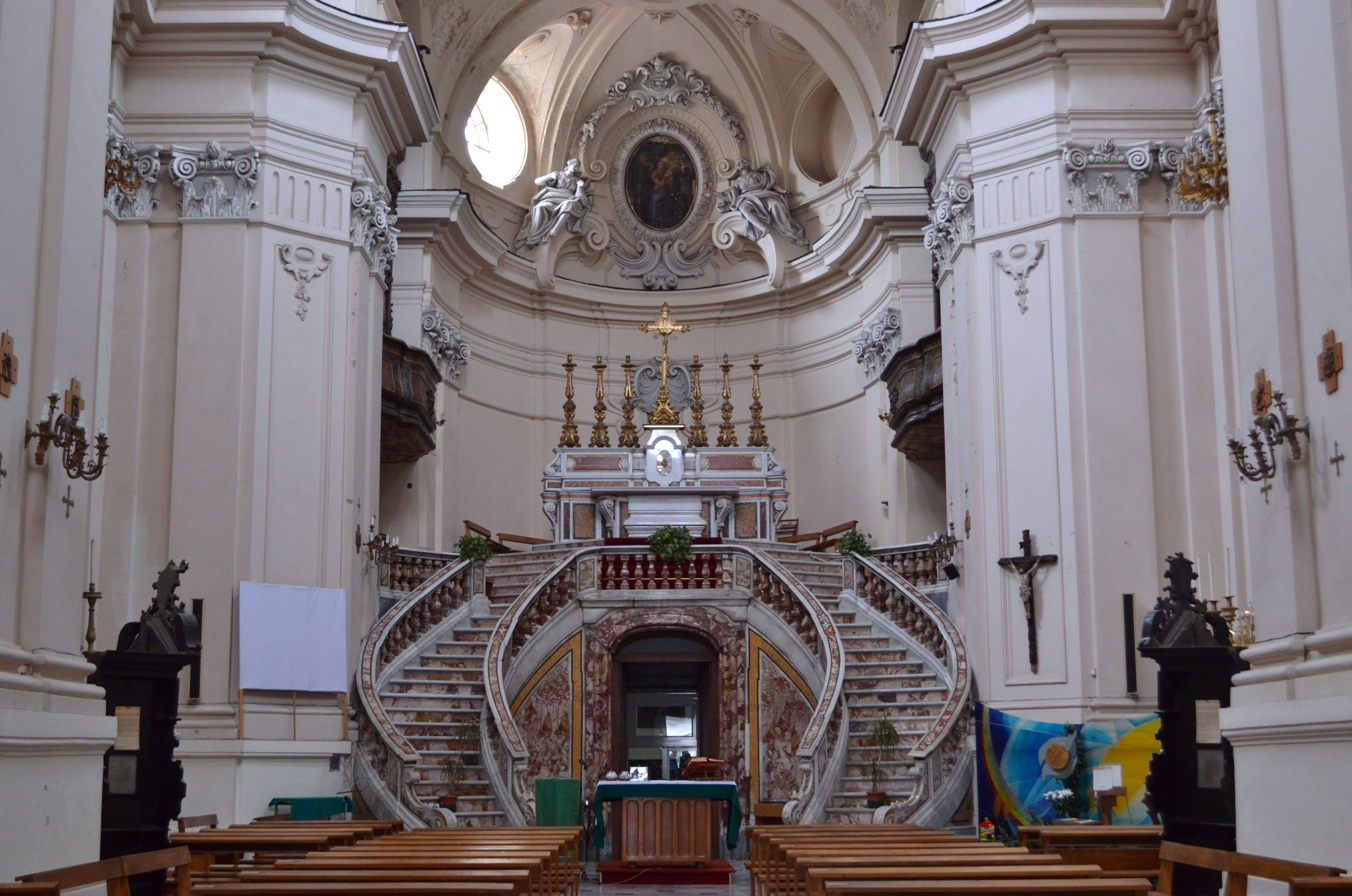
Interior

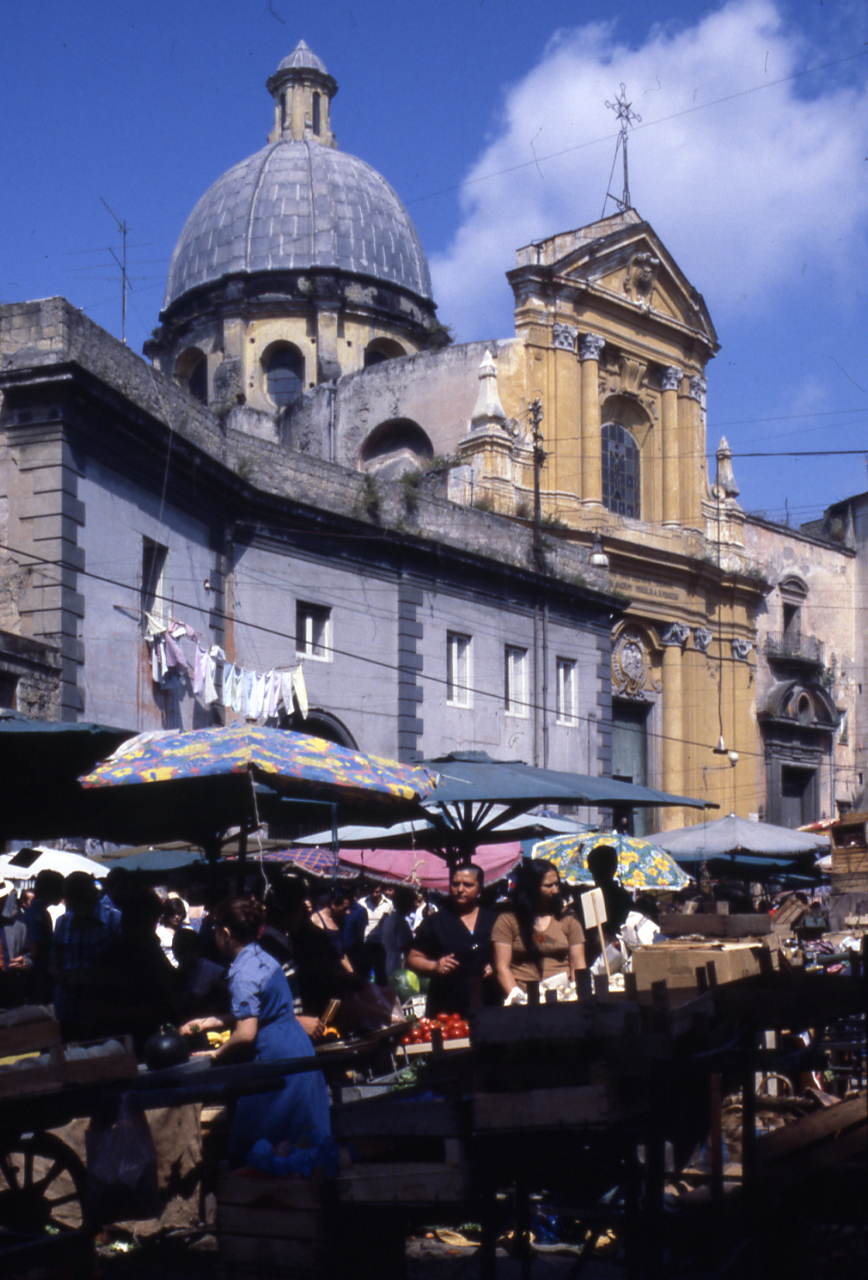
The church with the dome in a 1978 photo by Paolo Monti

The church was founded in the 16th century near the former city gate at Porta Capuana, as a small chapel for the monks of the Convent of San Francesco di Paola. Construction of the present structure dates from 1751, a design by Giuseppe Astarita. The interior has a raised altar reached by a double ramp stairwell. The canvas in the cupola depicts the Holy Family with St Anne by Marco Cardisco. The organ was made in 1753, by Nicola and Carlo Mancini. The chapels were painted in the 18th century by Francesco Narici and Giovanni Cosenza.

== Bibliography ==
- Vincenzo Regina, Le chiese di Napoli. Viaggio indimenticabile attraverso la storia artistica, architettonica, letteraria, civile e spirituale della Napoli sacra, Newton and Compton editor, Naples 2004.
