= San Raffaele, Naples =

Church of San Raffaele
- Chiesa di San Raffaele
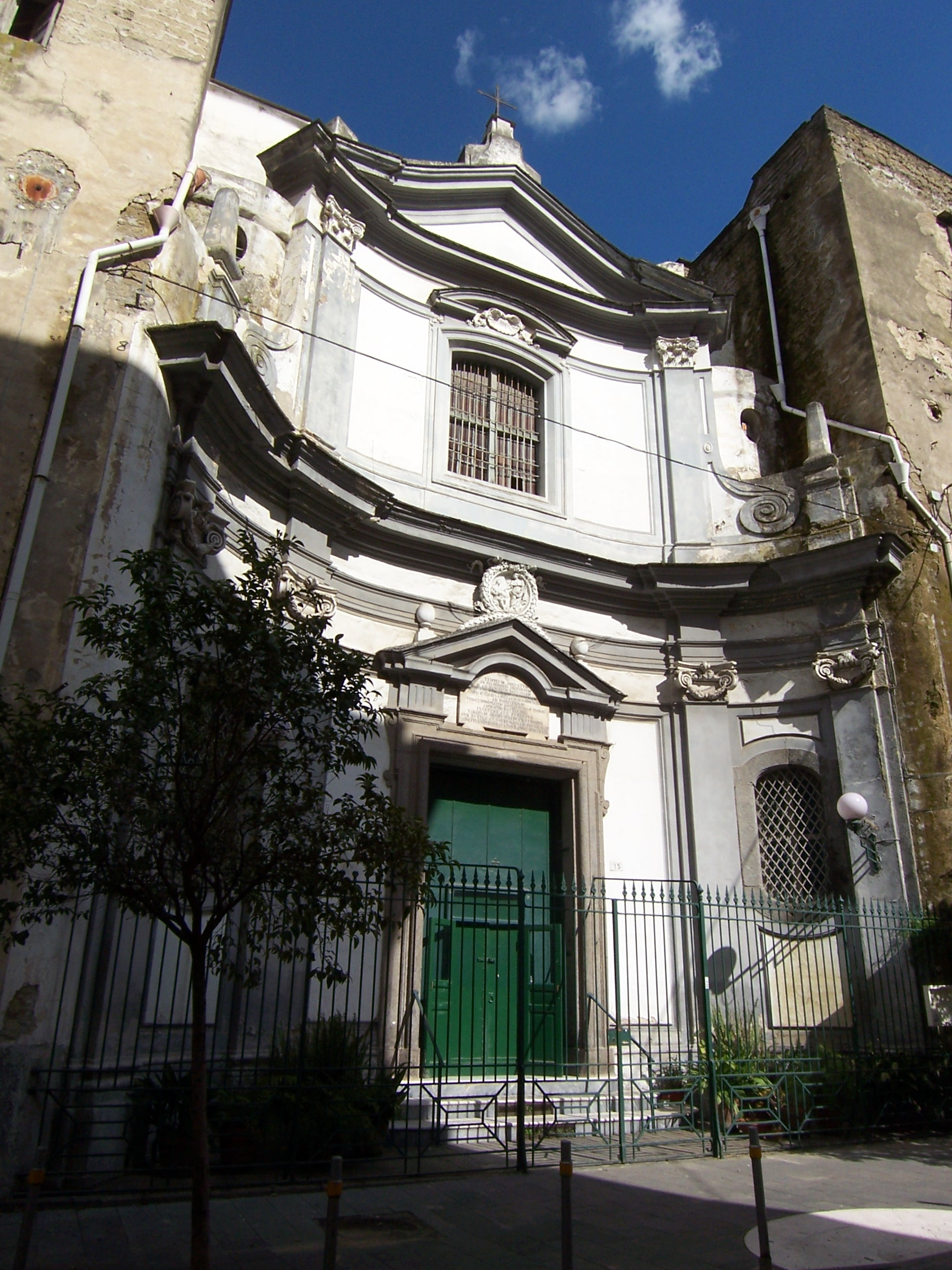
- The façade of church.
- Church of San Raffaele
- 40.855150°N 14.244000°E
- Location: Via Amato di Montecassino; Naples; Province of Naples, Campania
- Country: Italy
- Denomination: Roman Catholic

History
- Status: Active

Architecture
- Architectural type: Church
- Style: Baroque architecture

Administration
- Diocese: Roman Catholic Archdiocese of Naples

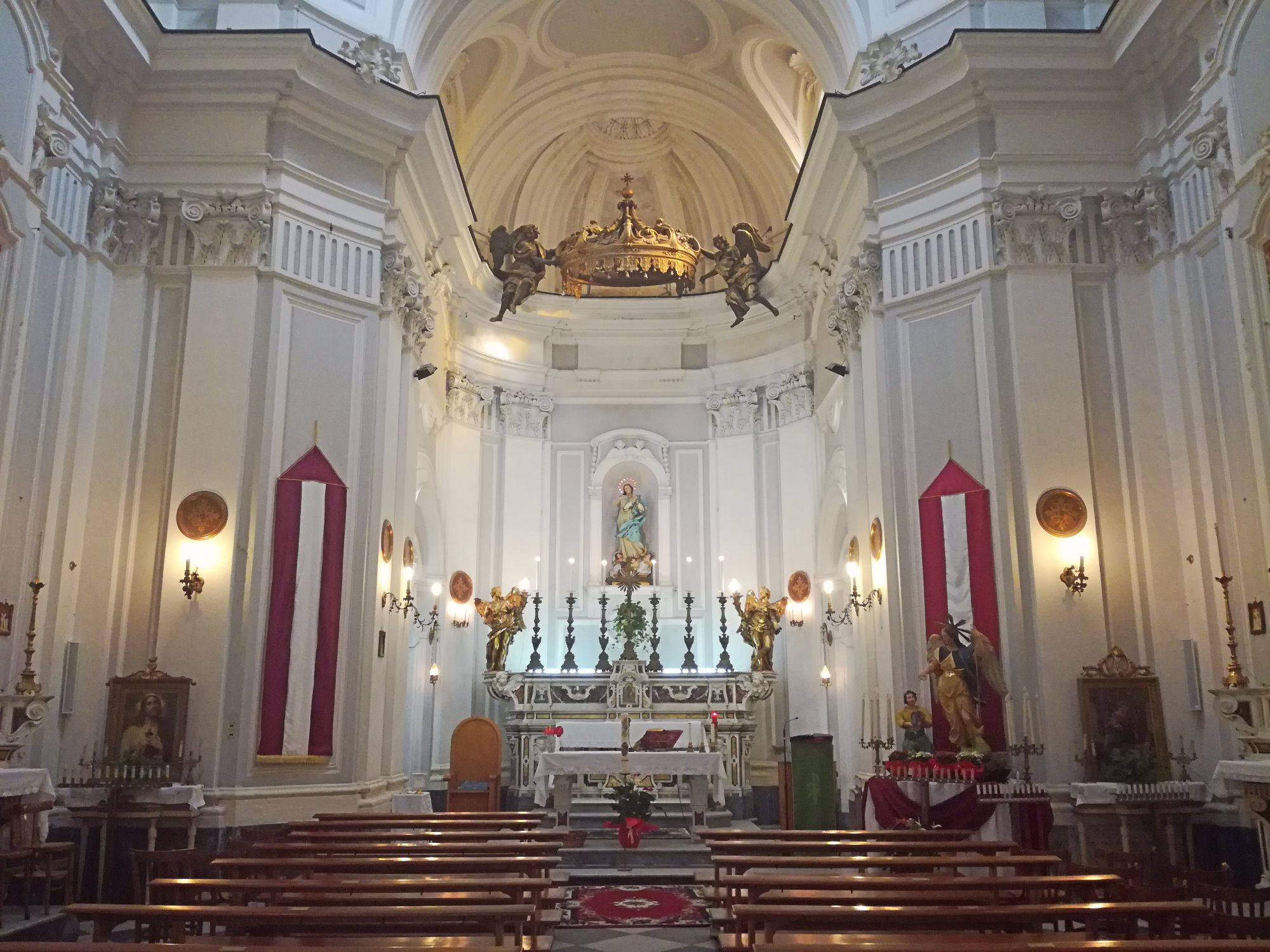
Interior towards the altar

San Raffaele (also known as San Raffaele a Materdei or properly, Santi Raffaele e Margherita da Cortona) is a church on Via Amato di Montecassino, in the quartiere of Materdei in Naples, Italy.

The church was founded in 1759 built on designs of Giuseppe Astarita, adjacent to a hospice for women called a Ritiro delle Pentite, or hospice for prostitutes. The interior has a Greek cross layout. The interior has a highly decorated polychrome altar surmounted by a baldacchino of gilded wood with angels and a crown. The frescoes were completed by Angelo Mozzillo. San Raffaele (St Raphael), the patron of fishermen, and often represented in paintings with fish. The saint of this church was often revered by infertile couples.

== Bibliography ==
- Antonio Terraciano, Andrea Russo, Le chiese di Napoli. Censimento e brevi recensioni delle 448 chiese storiche della città di Napoli, Lorenzo Giunta Editore, 1999.
