= Reggia di Quisisana =

Royal villa near Castellammare di Stabia, Campania, Italy

Coordinates: 40.6849°N 14.4886°E

The Reggia di Quisisana is a former royal residence located in the frazione of Quisisana, outside of Castellammare di Stabia, in the Metropolitan City of Naples, region of Campania, Italy.

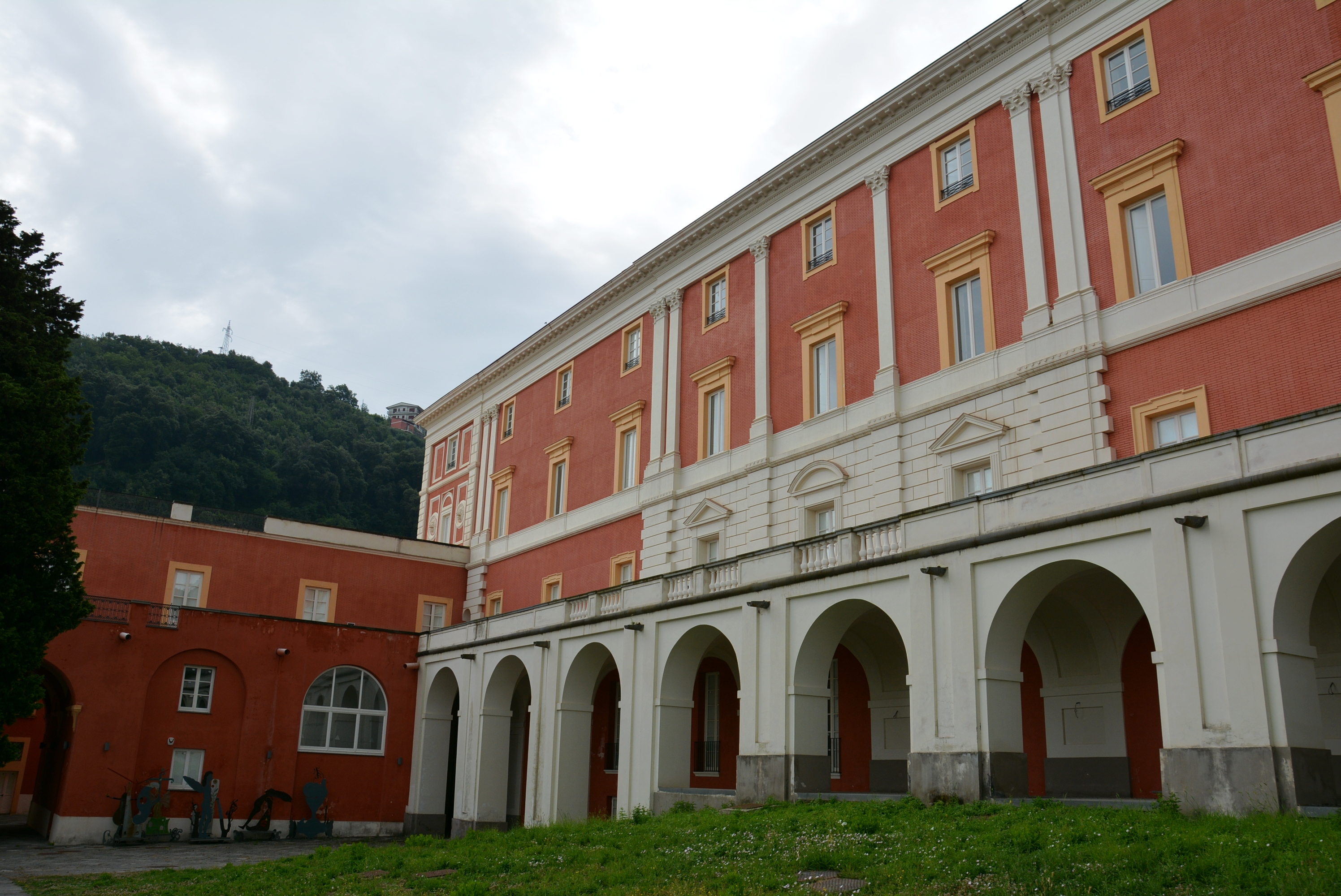
Facade of one of the structures

== History ==
A structure at the site is documented prior to 1200, but buildings have been modified over the centuries. Over the past century, it moved from royal summer residence to becoming a school, then a hotel, and finally falling into near ruin in the 21st century.

The term Quisisana is attributed to the term Domus de loco sano, or place of healing. The Villa is mentioned in 1280 relation to Charles I d'Anjou and mentioned in the Decameron. It was at the time part of a fortified town. In the following centuries it became property of the Farnese family. But the villa was refurbished under the House of Bourbon including in 1758 Ferdinand IV of Naples, and later, Ferdinand II of Naples. In 1878, the House of Savoy ceded the property to the commune, and it became the elegant Hotel Margherita and later in 1923, Royal Hotel Quisisana until the 1960s. The layout is a jumble of wings. The surroundings are Italian Gardens. In 2016, the property is still under restoration.
