= Giovanni Battista Spinelli =

Italian painter

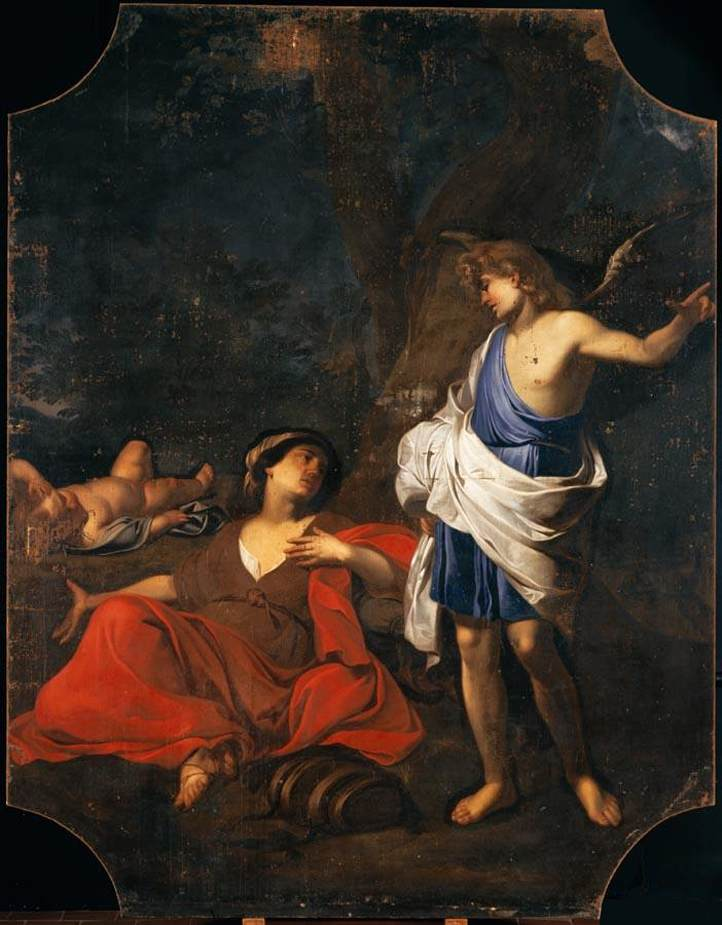
Hagar and the Angel

Giovanni Battista Spinelli (c.1597, Chieti - 20 November 1647 (?), Ortona) was an Italian painter.

== Biography ==
He was born to a wealthy family. His father, Sante, was originally from Bergamo and had moved to Chieti to be a grain merchant. His sister, Caterina, was married to Baron Ludovico de Pizzis of Ortona; known for his numerous feuds. His earliest art lessons may have come from Domenico Carpinoni in the 1620s.

Spinelli established himself throughout Abruzzo, At the Chiesa della Santissima Trinità there is a Coronation of Mary, done around 1630. He also painted at churches in Chieti and Penne.

After 1630, he moved to Naples, where he worked with Massimo Stanzione and Battistello Caracciolo. He is believed to have been the latter's last student. Both of them had a great influence on his compositional style. His is also known to have been an avid collector of prints from Northern Europe; including Lucas van Leyden, Hendrik Goltzius, Jacob Matham and Heinrich Aldegrever. Their influence is often obvious, especially in his mythological and historical portraits.

In recent years, his works have been studied by many art historians, including Roberto Longhi, and his reputation has been somewhat rehabilitated. He has been especially praised for the physical and physiognomic characteristics of his figures. Many of his works can be found at Castellammare di Stabia and in private collections in Naples. Other works are at the Uffizi gallery and an "Adoration of the Shepherds" is in the collection of the National Gallery in London. His individual canvases are difficult to date and of uneven quality; having been painted to the specifications of private clients.

According to his biographer, Bernardo De Dominici, Spinelli gave up painting for alchemy and died while conducting an experiment in 1647, at the approximate age of fifty. More recent studies suggest that he lived until at least 1658.

== References/Sources ==
- Bernardo de Domenici, Vite dei Pittori, Scultori, ed Architetti Napolitani, Vol.III, 1742. Listing online @ Google Books
