= Angelo Mozzillo =

Italian painter

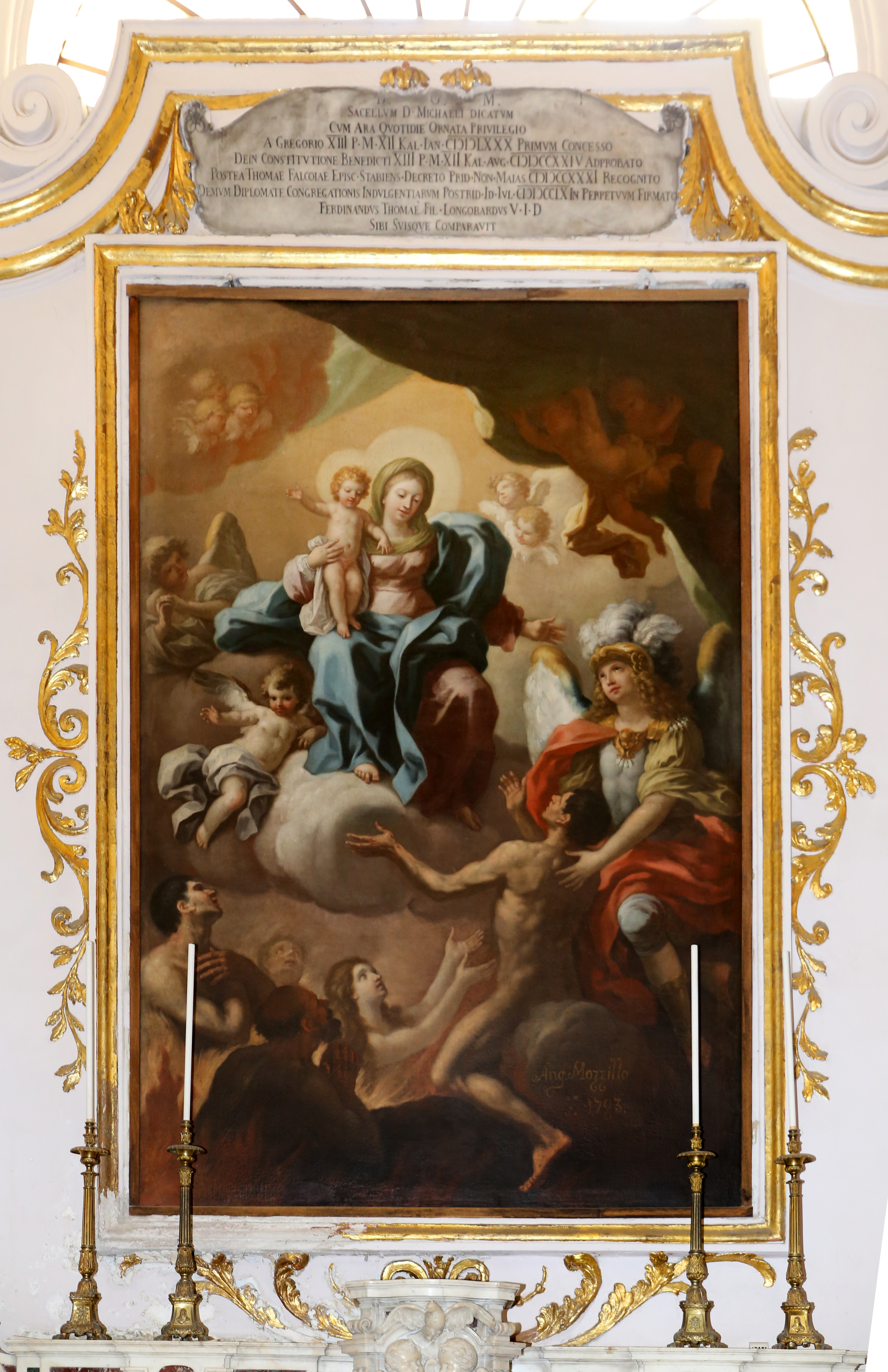
The Virgin saves the Souls of Purgatory, Castellammare di Stabia

Angelo Mozzillo (24 October 1736 in Afragola – May 1810, in Nola) was an Italian painter of the late Baroque, active near Naples, Italy.

He initially trained with a Giuseppe Bonito (Peppariello). After 1758, he left Afragola and moved to Nola. He then moved to study in the Academy of Fine Arts of Naples under Giuseppe Bonito and Paolo de Maio. In Nola, he painted several painting: an Immaculate Conception for the Cappella Nuova; a San Nicola di Bari, and a St Francesco di Paola. He also painted for the church of San Raffaele, Naples.
