= Castellammare di Stabia =

Castellammare di Stabia Castiellammare 'e Stabbia (Neapolitan)
- Comune
- Comune di Castellammare di Stabia
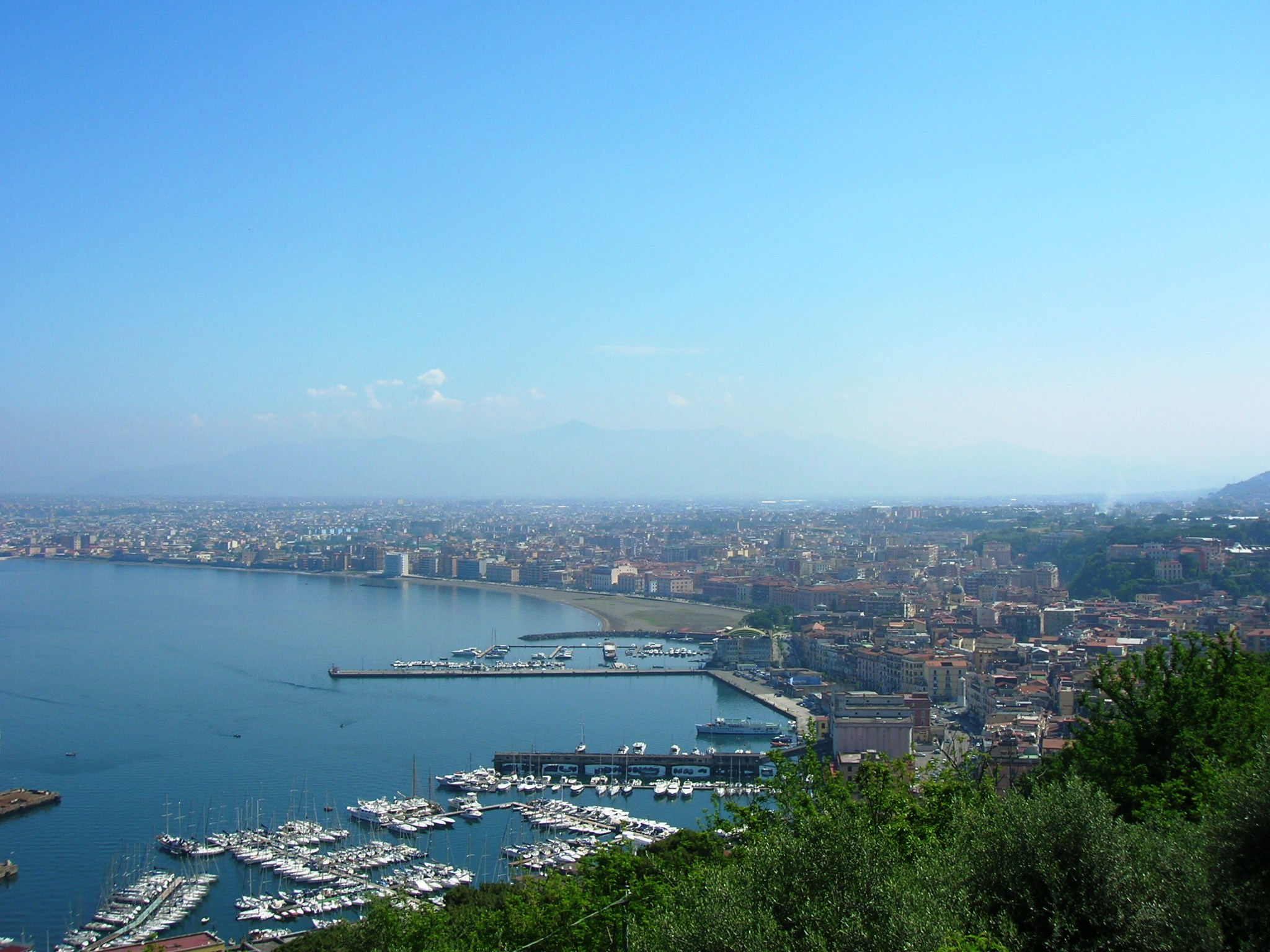
- Castellammare di Stabia with the Gulf of Naples and the Vesuvio

- Flag Coat of arms

- Castellammare within the Metropolitan City of Naples

- Location within Italy Location within Campania
- Coordinates: 40°41′41″N 14°28′49″E
- Country: Italy
- Region: Campania
- Metropolitan city: Naples (NA)
- Frazioni: Fratte, Madonna della Libera, Pioppaino, Ponte Persica, Pozzano, Privati, Quisisana, Scanzano, Varano

Government
  - Mayor: Luigi Vicinanza

Area
  - Total: 17.81 km^{2} (6.88 sq mi)
- Elevation: 6 m (20 ft)

Population (2026)
  - Total: 61,937
  - Density: 3,478/km^{2} (9,007/sq mi)
- Demonym: Stabiesi
- Time zone: UTC+1 (CET)
  - Summer (DST): UTC+2 (CEST)
- Postal code: 80053
- Dialing code: 081
- Patron saint: Saint Catellus
- Saint day: 19 January
- Website: Official website

Castellammare di Stabia (Italian: [kaˌstɛllamˈmaːre di ˈstaːbja]; Neapolitan: Castiellammare 'e Stabbia) is a city and comune (municipality) in the Metropolitan City of Naples in the region of Campania in southern Italy. It is situated on the Bay of Naples about 30 km (19 mi) southeast of Naples, on the route to Sorrento. It has 61,937 inhabitants.

== History ==
=== Antiquity ===
Castellammare di Stabia lies next to the ancient Roman city of Stabiae, which functioned as a seaport for the inland city of Nuceria. The city's importance was diminished after it was razed in 90 BC during the Social War, a setback from which it never fully recovered. Nevertheless, it remained inhabited, with a center with a rectangular grid plan, shops, and a temple precinct that was active until the eruption of Vesuvius in 79 AD.

During the late 1st century BC, the surrounding escarpment attracted the construction of luxurious villas, which were expanded and elaborated upon in subsequent years. The villas were damaged in an earthquake in 62–63 AD. While many of these structures were still in the process of being rebuilt, they were ultimately buried under several meters of pumice during the eruption of 79 AD. The same eruption also killed the prominent Roman military commander and writer Pliny the Elder, who died at a local villa after succumbing to poisonous fumes.

=== Middle Ages ===
The castle, from which the modern city takes its name, was erected around the 9th century on a hill commanding the southern side of the Gulf of Naples. It was restored during the reign of Frederick II of Hohenstaufen and enlarged by King Charles I of Anjou.

The Castle After the destruction of Stabiae by Vesuvius, some local inhabitants who had survived the eruption returned to their old, now destroyed homes to recover objects and money. It was these inhabitants who established a village along the coast, which, as a result of the eruption, had become much further into the sea than in the past.

This new village, which lived primarily from fishing and agriculture, became part of the Duchy of Sorrento. It was the Sorrentines who built a castle on the hill near Pozzano to defend the duchy from barbarian incursions.

During this period, in 1086 to be precise, the name of the village, Castrum ad Mare, is found for the first time in a document, most likely deriving from the fact that the castle was located nearby, overlooking the sea. During the Middle Ages it was equipped with a city wall, like other cities.

The city of Castellammare asked Queen Giovanna I of Naples (also known as Giovanna I) for a loan for the construction of a new defensive tower called the Quartuccio Tower. The decree for its construction was made official on July 28, 1364.

Castellammare di Stabia passed first under the Swabians, and subsequently under the control of the Aragonese, who, in addition to the enlargement of the port and the construction of mighty surrounding walls, completed the construction of a royal palace on the Quisisana hill, used by the royals for their summer stays.

The importance of the palace was such that Giovanni Boccaccio made it the setting for a story of the Decameron, precisely the sixth of the tenth day.

=== From the 20th century to today ===
The comune, previously called "Castellamare", assumed the name "Castellammare" on 22 January 1863, and the current name on 31 May 1912.

== Geography ==
Castellammare borders with the municipalities of Gragnano, Pimonte, Pompei, Santa Maria la Carità, Torre Annunziata and Vico Equense.

It comprises the hamlets (frazioni) of Fratte, Madonna della Libera, Pioppaino, Ponte Persica, Pozzano, Privati, Quisisana, Scanzano and Varano.

=== Climate ===
Climate data for Castellammare di Stabia (1961-1990)
| Month | Jan | Feb | Mar | Apr | May | Jun | Jul | Aug | Sep | Oct | Nov | Dec | Year |
|---|---|---|---|---|---|---|---|---|---|---|---|---|---|
| Mean daily maximum °C (°F) | 12.5 (54.5) | 13.9 (57.0) | 16.6 (61.9) | 21.0 (69.8) | 24.9 (76.8) | 29.7 (85.5) | 32.2 (90.0) | 31.8 (89.2) | 28.9 (84.0) | 23.3 (73.9) | 18.0 (64.4) | 14.5 (58.1) | 22.3 (72.1) |
| Mean daily minimum °C (°F) | 6.2 (43.2) | 6.3 (43.3) | 8.3 (46.9) | 11.3 (52.3) | 14.5 (58.1) | 18.3 (64.9) | 20.3 (68.5) | 20.5 (68.9) | 17.9 (64.2) | 14.6 (58.3) | 10.9 (51.6) | 8.5 (47.3) | 13.1 (55.6) |

== Demographics ==
As of 2026, the population is 61,937, of which 47.8% are male, and 52.2% are female. Minors make up 16.4% of the population, and seniors make up 22.6%.

Historical population

| Year | Pop. | ±% |
|---|---|---|
| 1861 | 21,973 | — |
| 1871 | 26,072 | +18.7% |
| 1881 | 32,553 | +24.9% |
| 1901 | 32,589 | +0.1% |
| 1911 | 33,579 | +3.0% |
| 1921 | 38,860 | +15.7% |
| 1931 | 43,045 | +10.8% |
| 1936 | 46,469 | +8.0% |
| 1951 | 56,254 | +21.1% |

| Year | Pop. | ±% |
|---|---|---|
| 1961 | 64,618 | +14.9% |
| 1971 | 68,629 | +6.2% |
| 1981 | 70,685 | +3.0% |
| 1991 | 68,733 | −2.8% |
| 2001 | 66,929 | −2.6% |
| 2011 | 65,944 | −1.5% |
| 2021 | 63,330 | −4.0% |
| 2026 | 61,937 | −2.2% |

Source: ISTAT

=== Immigration ===
As of 2025, immigrants make up 2.8% of the population. The 5 largest foreign countries of birth are Ukraine, Bulgaria, Bangladesh, Romania, and Brazil.

== Religious buildings ==
- Castellammare Cathedral
- San Bartolomeo
- Santa Caterina
- Chiesa del Gesù
- Chiesa del Purgatorio

== Archaeology ==
Archaeological works at Castellammare di Stabia began with Bourbon excavations in 1749, which revealed an urban center with a rectangular street grid, shops, and a temple precinct. These works were documented by travelers such as the English travel writer Henry Swinburne, who saw rooms being uncovered in 1777. Excavations were renewed in 1951 through the efforts of local schoolmaster Libero D'Orsi.

Among the most notable remains at Castellammare di Stabia is a series of ancient seaside villas located on the Collina di Varano, including Villa Arianna and Villa San Marco. Villa Arianna features decorated sea-facing rooms and summer triclinia. Excavations near the villa's farm buildings uncovered parts of two ancient wooden carts. Villa San Marco features a monumental portico with a large swimming pool once bordered by plane trees. A significant artifact recovered from this villa was a bronze water-tank; however, after being acquired by the British diplomat William Hamilton, it was lost during the 1798 shipwreck of HMS Colossus. Another villa located nearby, the Villa del Pastore is thought to have functioned as a health spa, comparable to those found at Baiae.

The site is also significant for its frescoes, depicting mythological scenes such as Perseus with the head of Medusa and Iphigenia, daughter of Agamemnon. Many of these artworks were moved to Naples by Bourbon excavators, leaving marks where they were chiselled from the walls. Archaeological evidence also includes tile-stamps mentioning Narcissus, the freedman secretary of Emperor Claudius, though it remains unclear if he was the villa's owner or just the supplier of roof tiles.

== Thermal baths ==
Castellammare is known as the "Metropole of the waters" for its hydrological heritage of 28 different kinds of waters, divided in sulphurous, calcic bicarbonate and mineral water, each one with a particular healthy property. The thermal bath has been a huge part of the economic life as well as of the tourism of Castellammare since the 19th century. To take advantage of the waters' property there are two different thermal baths, one in the historical centre of the town and the other on the hill. Besides, the two most important waters of Castellammare, Acqua della Madonna and Acetosella, have been known since the time of Pliny the Elder, who suggested to drink them in case of calculosis, today they are sold as far away as America.

=== Ancient Thermal Baths ===
The Ancient Thermal Baths were inaugurated in 1836 and since the beginning had a very important role for the citizens and also for the tourists coming in summer for the thermal cure, making the city very crowded. Because of this overcrowding the building was enlarged with new pavilions and pools for the thermal cures of the body, like a real spa but it was also a cultural centre where many art exhibitions, cultural events and concerts were held. The destruction of the ancient building began on 26 February 1956, to make way for today's building. At the end of the 1980s the thermal building was in crisis because most of its offered treatments were closed, even if today they are offered in the New Thermal Baths. Today the Ancient Baths opens only few hours a day for bathing. In summer there are some cultural events. In the summer of 2007 the renovation of the building began to enable services to resume, but the ancient thermal baths remained closed as of 2024.

=== New Thermal Baths ===
The New Thermal Baths, located on the hill of the Solaro, near the district of Scanzano, was inaugurated on 26 July 1964. This building has two zones: one zone is the building dedicated to the thermal cure and then there is the park for the hydroponic cure. The building for the thermal cure offers the chance of practicing physiotherapy, hyperbaric medicine, massages, mud baths, inhalation of the sulphurous waters, rehabilitating, dermatological, aesthetic and gynaecological cures. Instead the hydroponic park allows practicing hydrotherapy, that is drinking the specific kind of water to cure specific pathologies, while walking through the park. Moreover, in summer in the park there are many events, during mornings and evenings, such as concerts, open cinema, exhibitions and conventions. Because of lack of demand and political turmoil, the new thermal baths remain closed as of 2024.

== Sport ==
The local football team, Società Sportiva Juve Stabia is an Italian football club based in Castellammare di Stabia, Campania. Juve Stabia will play in Serie B, the second tier of Italian football system, following their promotion ahead of the 2024-25 season.

== Notable people ==
- Pliny the Elder, born Gaius Plinius Secundus (AD 23 – 25 August, AD 79), adoptive citizen and resident of Stabiae (ancient name of Castellammare di Stabia), where he died during the 25 August, AD 79 Mt. Vesuvius eruption. Roman author, naturalist, and natural philosopher, as well as naval and army commander of the early Roman Empire, and personal friend of the emperor Vespasian.
- Catello, Saint (9th century), Patron of the city
- Giuseppe Bonito (1707–1789), painter
- Nikolai Gogol (1809–1852) worked here on his Dead Souls in 1838, while living at the count Repnin's summer house.
- Luigi Denza (1846–1922), composer of the most famous Italian traditional song Funiculì, Funiculà
- Michele Esposito (1855–1929), influential composer, pianist, and conductor, who worked mostly in Ireland
- Ettore Tito (1859–1941), painter
- Raffaele Viviani (1888–1950), author, playwright, actor, musician
- John Serry, Sr. (1915–2003; aka Giovanni Serrapica), American musician, composer, arranger, educator
- Gabriele De Rosa (1917–2009), historian and politician
- Marcel Jovine (1921–2003), sculptor and toy designer
- Enzo Cannavale (1928-2011), actor
- Pupetta Maresca (1935-2021), 86, Italian mobster convicted murderer, and beauty queen
- Mario Merola (1934–2006), Neapolitan-style singer
- Giuseppe (born 1959) and Carmine Abbagnale (born 1962), Olympic gold medal rowers, grown up and trained at the Castellammare Yachting Club
- Francesco Schettino (born 1960), captain of the Costa Concordia ship which ran aground and sank in 2012
- Aldo Arcangioli (born 1969), entrepreneur
- Antonio Filosa (born 1973), business executive
- Gennaro Iezzo (born 1973), football goalkeeper
- Raffaele Imperiale (born 1974), Italian mobster, high-ranking member of Camorra
- Bruno Cirillo (born 1977), footballer
- Antonio Mirante (born 1983), goalkeeper for AC Milan
- Fabio Quagliarella (born 1983), striker and captain for Sampdoria
- Luigi Vitale (born 1987), footballer
- Antonio Donnarumma (born 1990), Padova goalkeeper, older brother of Gianluigi Donnarumma
- Ciro Immobile (born 1990), forward for SS Lazio
- Alessio Lapice (born 1991), actor
- Gianluigi Donnarumma (born 1999), goalkeeper for Manchester City and the Italy national team, second-youngest goalkeeper to play in Serie A
- Gaia De Martino (born 2001), dancer from Amici di Maria De Filippi
- Salvatore Esposito (born 2000), midfielder for Sampdoria and the Italy national team
- Sebastiano Esposito (born 2002), forward for Sassuolo and the Italy national team
- Pio Esposito (born 2005), forward for Inter Milan and the Italy national team

== Bibliography ==
=== Historical sources ===
- Giovanni Celoro Parascandolo (1965). Antonio Cortese's typography (ed.). Castellammare di Stabia [Castellammare di Stabia] (in Italian). Naples (NA).
- Gennaro Zurolo (2014). Signa et insignia, fonti per la storia del notariato a Castellammare di Stabia (secoli XIII-XIX) [Signa et insignia, sources for the history of the notary office in Castellammare di Stabia (13th-19th centuries)] (in Italian). Rende (PZ): Universal Book s.r.l.

== See also ==
- Bay of Naples
- Juve Stabia
- Gragnano
- Metropolitan City of Naples
- Pimonte
- Pompei
- Province of Naples
- Regio Cantiere di Castellammare di Stabia
- Reggia di Quisisana
- Santa Maria la Carità,
- Stabiae
- Torre Annunziata
- Vesuvius
- Vico Equense
