= Giuseppe Bonito =

Italian painter (1707–1789)

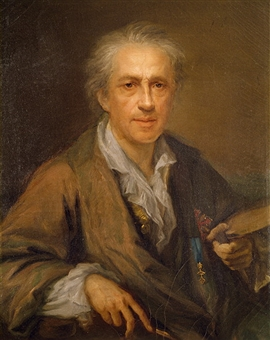
- Self-portrait
- Born: 11 January 1707; Castellammare di Stabia
- Died: 9 May 1789 (aged 82); Naples
- Education: Francesco Solimena
- Known for: Painting
- Movement: Rococo or late-Baroque
- Patrons: Neapolitan House of Borbon

Giuseppe Bonito (11 January 1707 – 9 May 1789) was a Neapolitan painter of the Rococo period. Giuseppe Bonito is known for genre depictions on canvas. Many of Gaspare Traversi's paintings had previously been attributed to Bonito.

== Biography ==
=== Early life and education ===
Bonito was born at Castellammare di Stabia, and, like Traversi, was a student at the large studio of Francesco Solimena. One of his contemporaries there was Gaspare Traversi. Bonito represented urban scenes with folklore details and figures of commedia dell'arte.

=== Court painter ===
Between the 1736 and 1742 Bonito worked for the House of Borbon in the royal Palace of Portici. The Turkish Ambassador in Naples in 1741 (1742; Madrid, Museo del Prado), probably his first royal portrait commission, exhibits the intense realism, carefully modelled light and naturalistic detail that thereafter distinguished his portraiture from that of his court predecessors, notably Pompeo Batoni. Portraits from this period include the series of nine paintings representing the Children of Charles III (1748; Madrid, Museo del Prado). He also painted portraits of the wife of Charles III, Maria Amalia of Saxony, wife of the Charles VII.

Throughout the 1750s Bonito was also active as a designer and adviser on artistic matters to the Bourbon court. He was appointed pittore di camera in 1751, elected to the Accademia di San Luca, Rome, in 1752 and from 1755 onwards was director of the Accademia di Belle Arti di Napoli. He executed a variety of royal commissions, including designs for commemorative medals and tapestries; among the latter are episodes from the Story of Don Quixote (designed 1758; tapestries, Royal Palace of Naples). He also continued to produce portraits, including the Portrait of a Neapolitan Gentlewoman (c. 1754–5; Bergamo, priv. col.) and the beguiling double portrait of Prince Ferdinand and Prince Gabriel (c. 1759; Naples, National Museum of San Martino).

His most acclaimed painting of the 1750s was the di sotto in sù vault fresco of the Dedication of Solomon’s Temple (1752–8; Naples, Santa Chiara), which exhibited the rich colours and deeply shaded contours characteristic of his style throughout the middle part of the century.

=== Later work ===
In the late 1750s Bonito’s religious paintings became more Rococo in style and spirit. The Crucifixion and the Holy Family (both c. 1757; Naples, Santi Giovanni e Teresa) incorporated paler tones and more diffused contours than he had used previously. A further, late transition in Bonito’s style is evident in the badly damaged Immaculate Conception of the 1780s (Royal Palace of Caserta), which has the languid rhythms, pale luminosity and rich surface textures typical of the 18th-century Rococo style elsewhere in Europe. A late Self-portrait (1785–9) is also preserved (Florence, Uffizi).

Bonito died in Naples on 9 May 1789. One of his pupils was Angelo Mozzillo. Bonito is also thought to have executed a great number of genre pictures, but this aspect of his career remains uncertain and controversial.

== Gallery ==
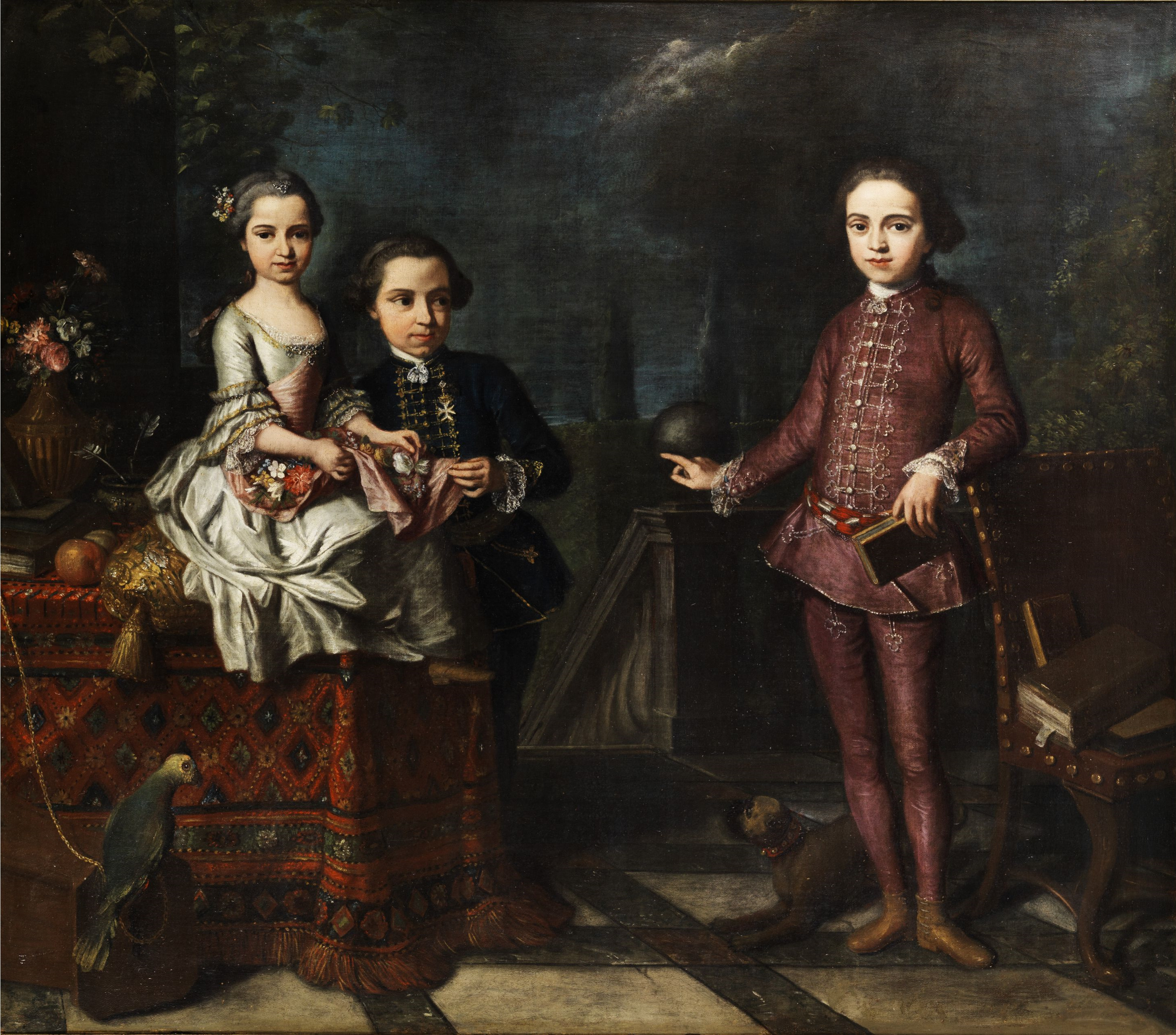
Family Portrait

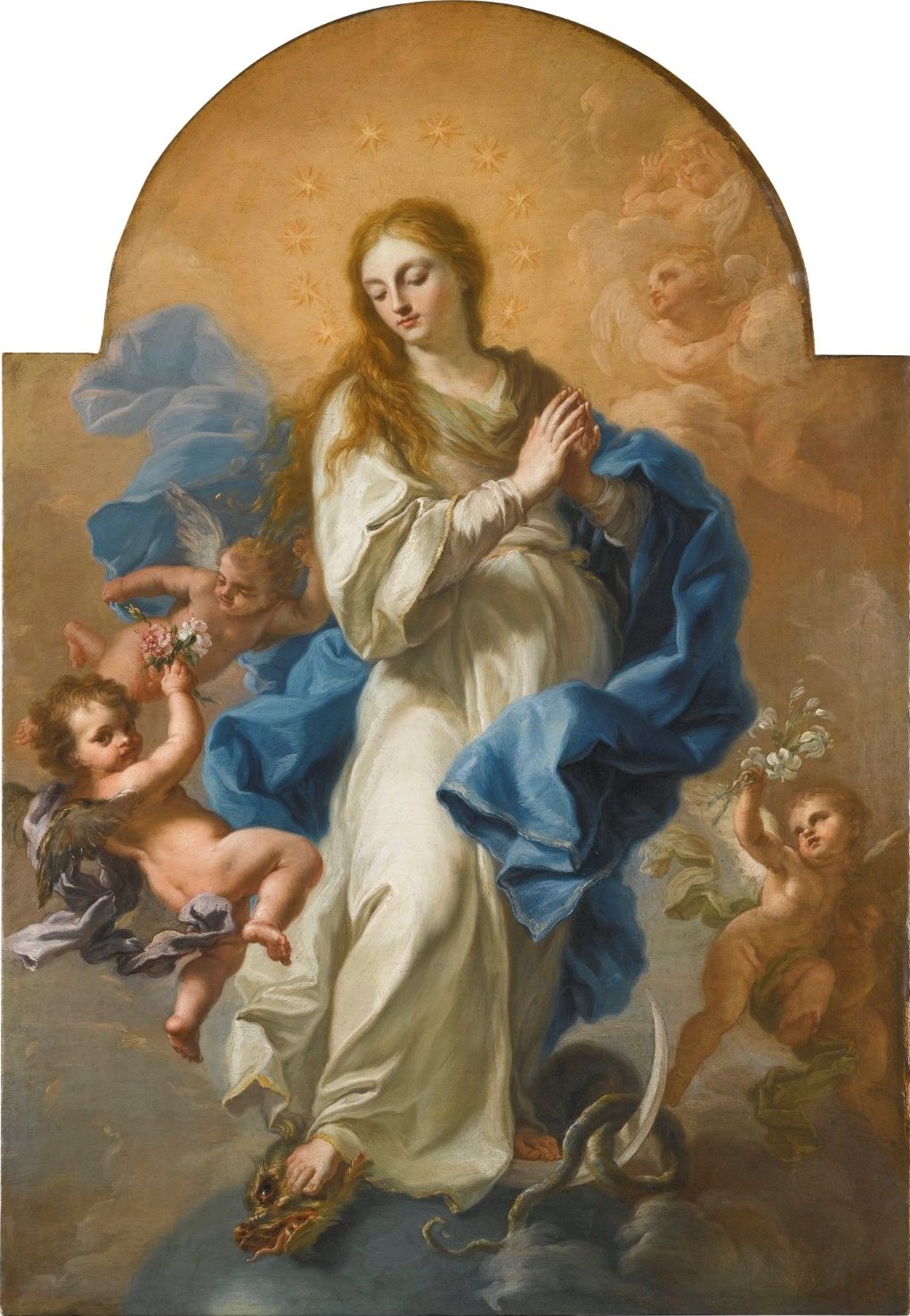
The Immaculate Conception

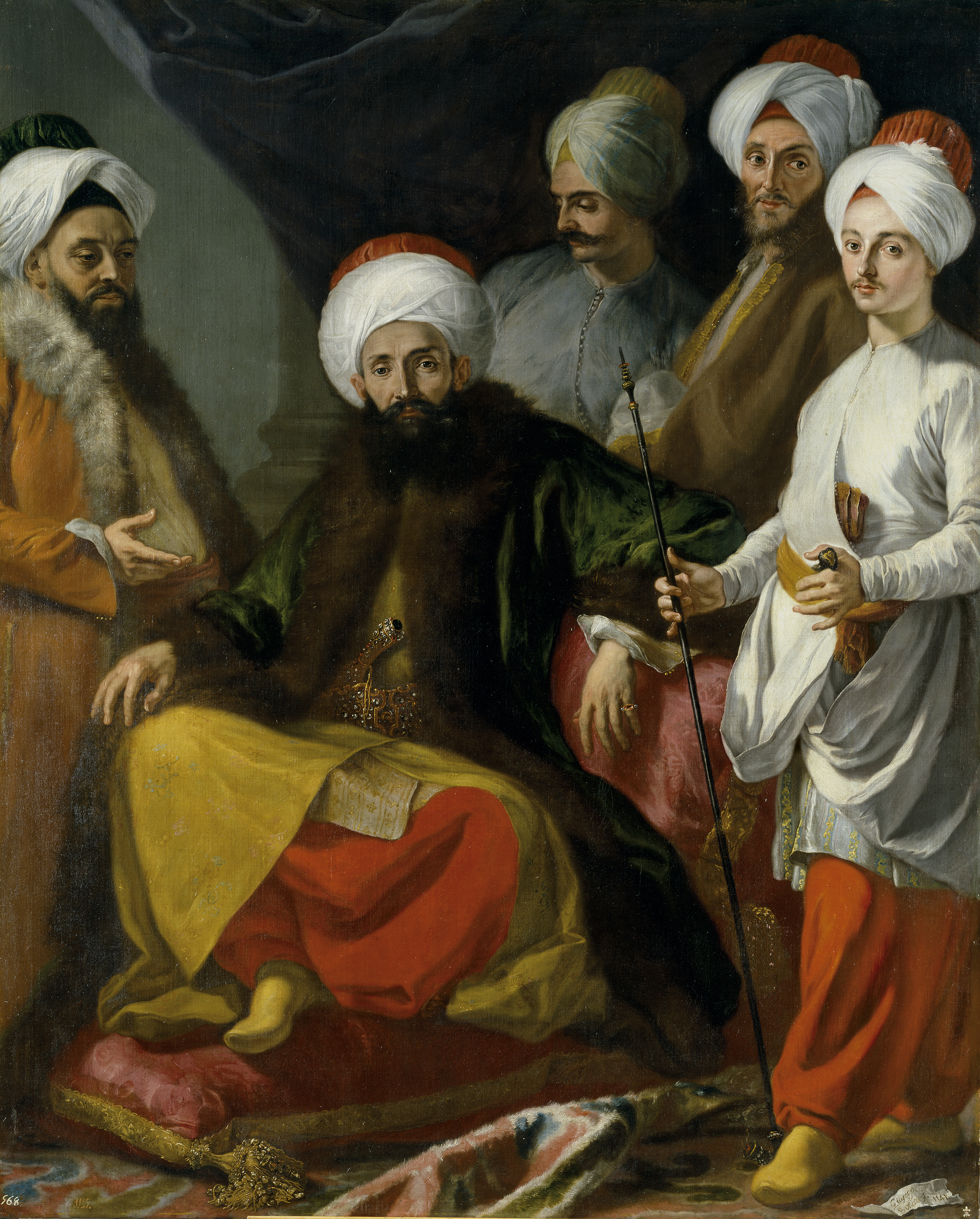
The Turkish Ambassador in Naples in 1741

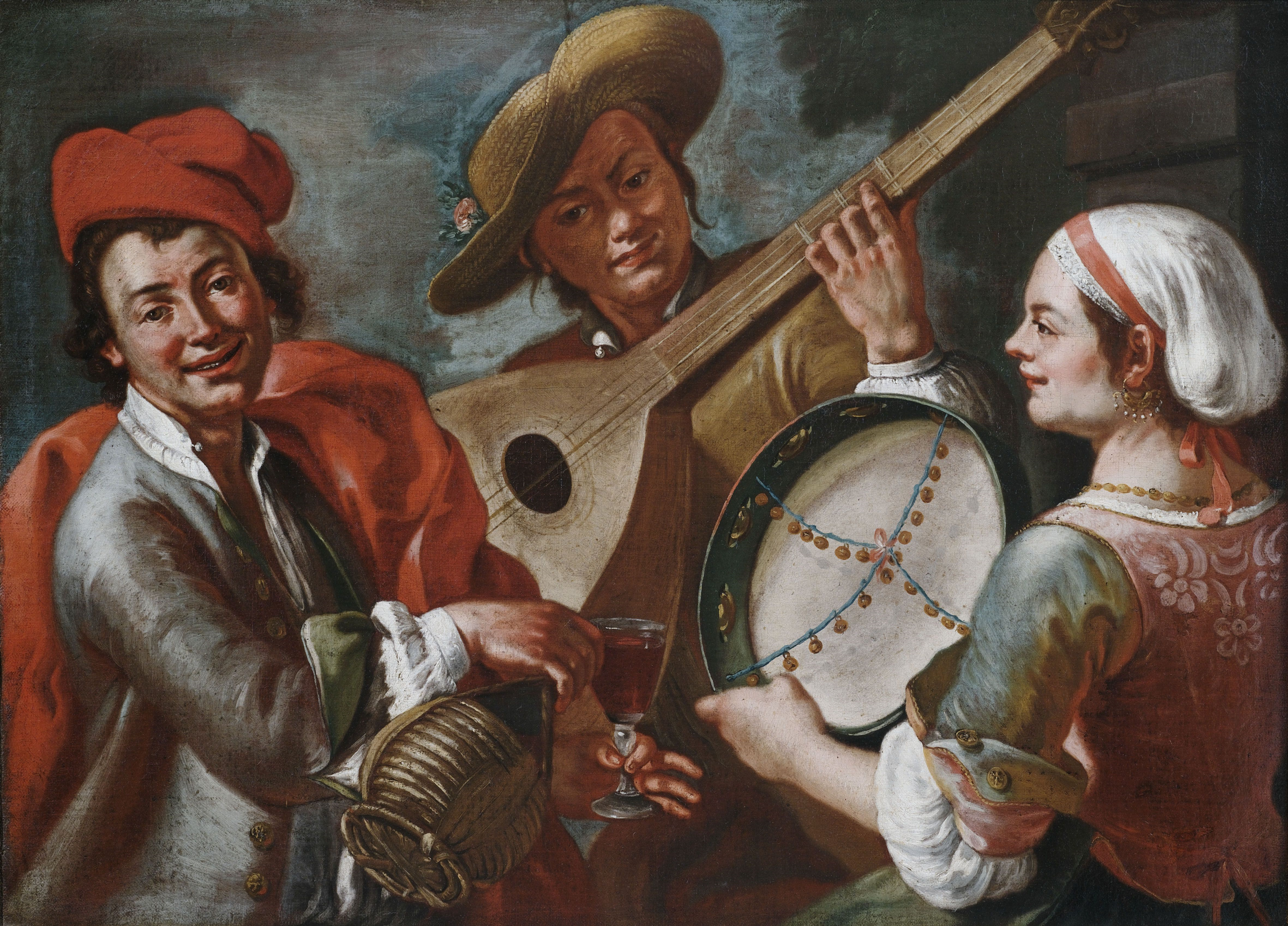
Concertino

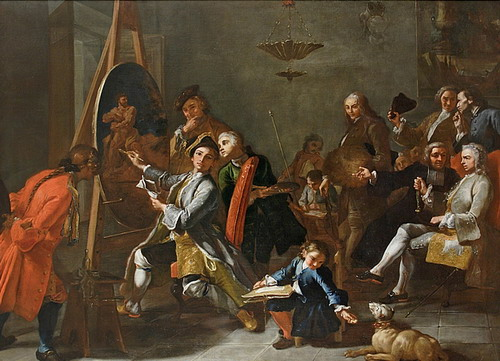
The Painter's Studio

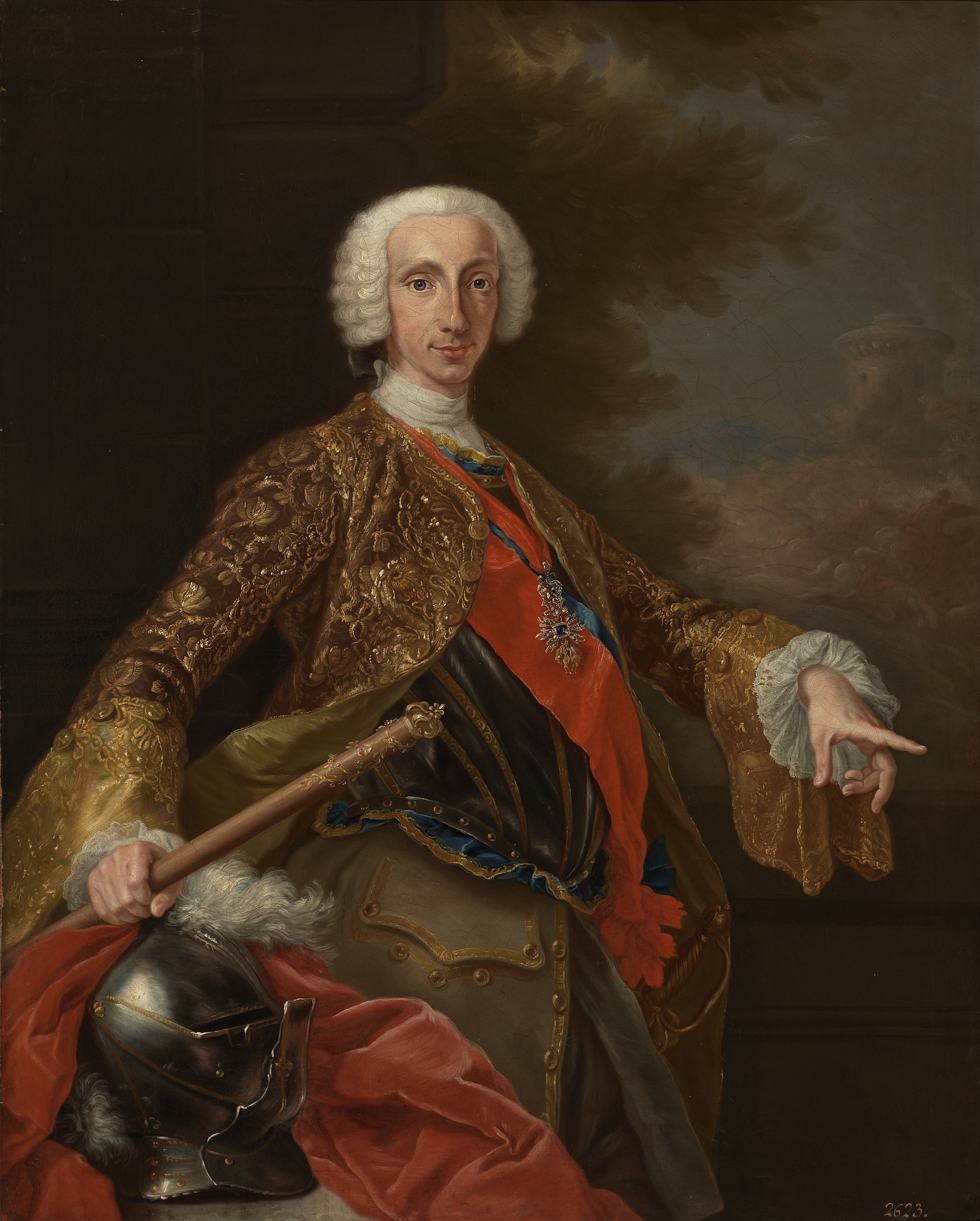
Charles VII

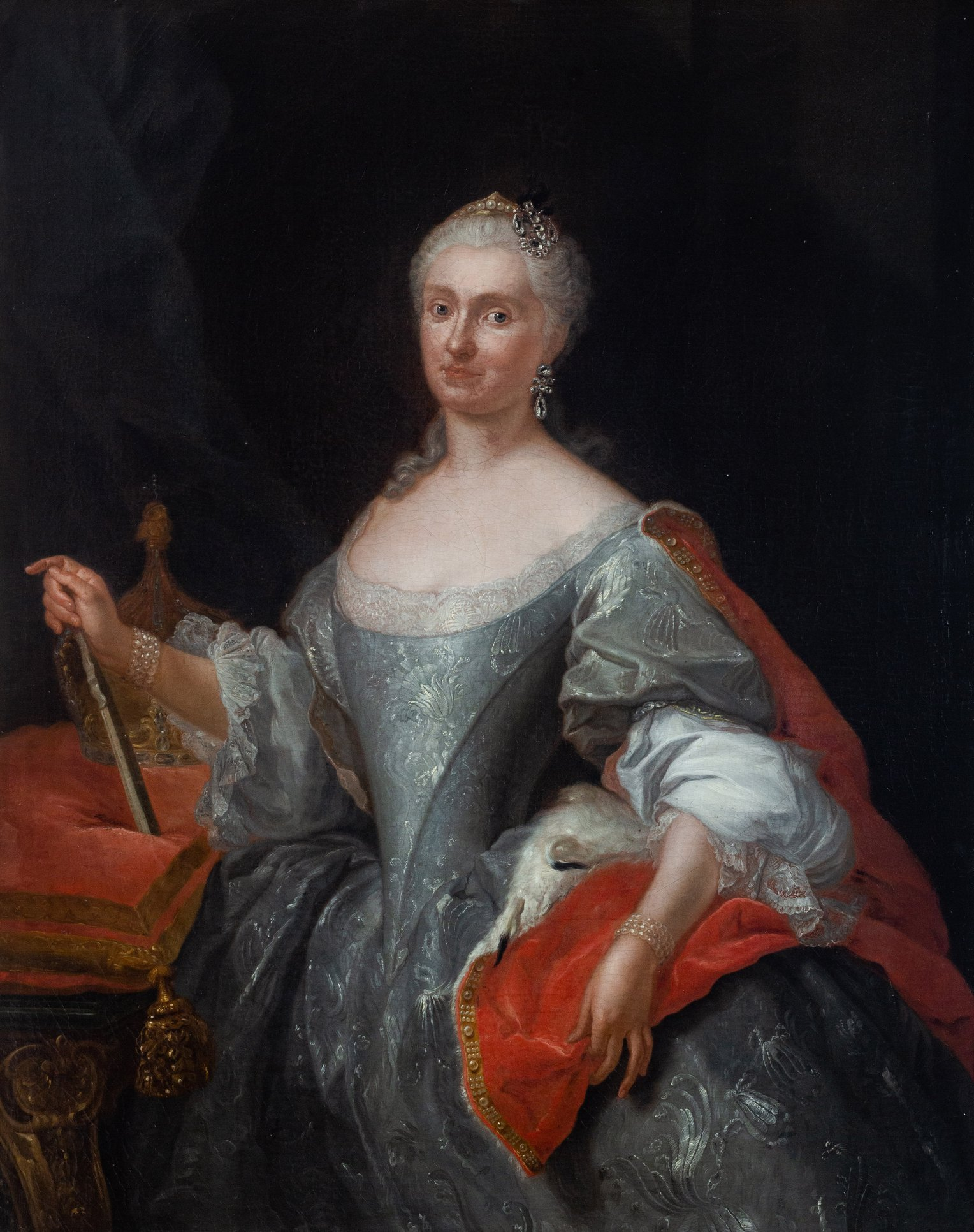
Maria Amalia of Saxony

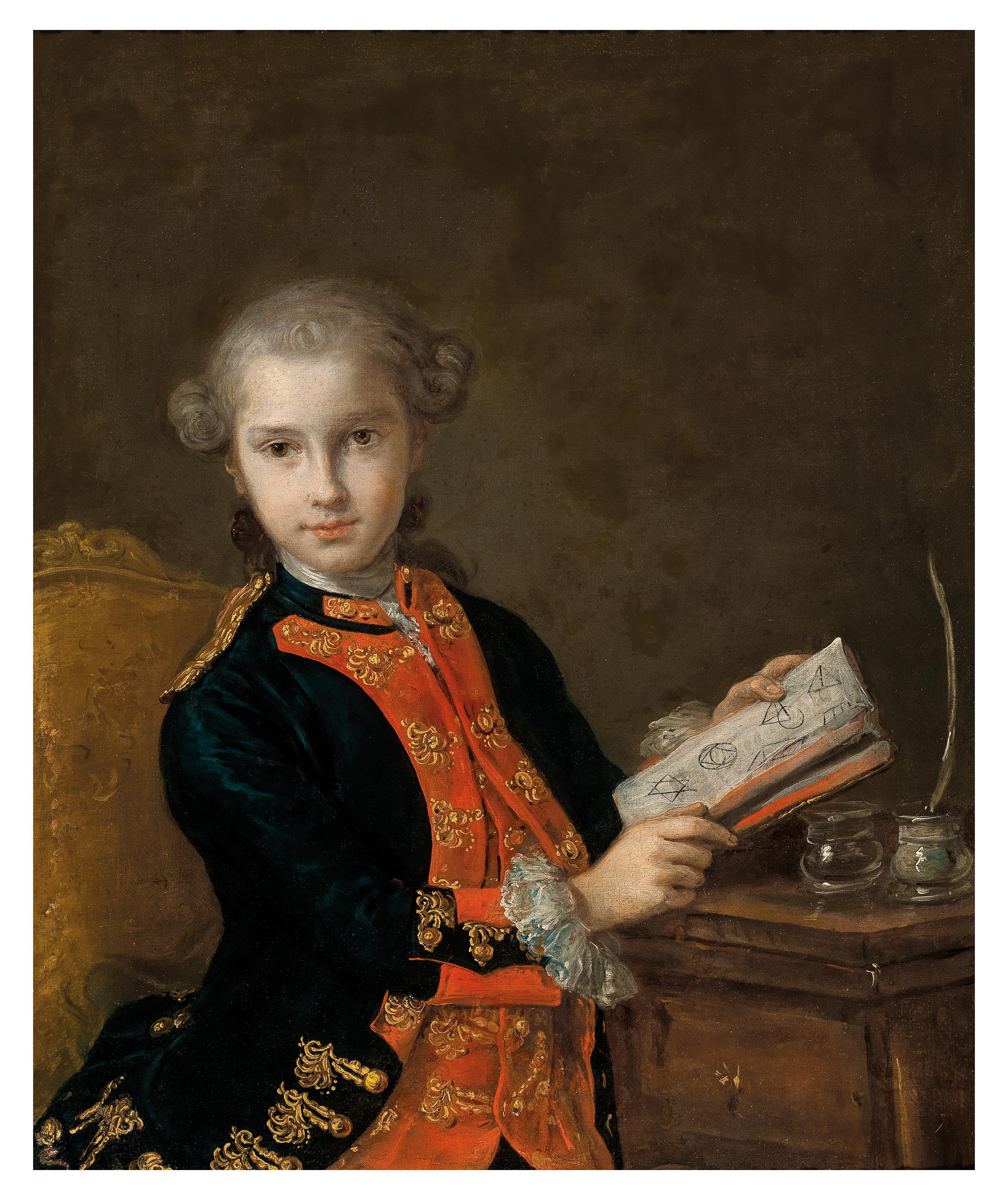
Portrait of a boy

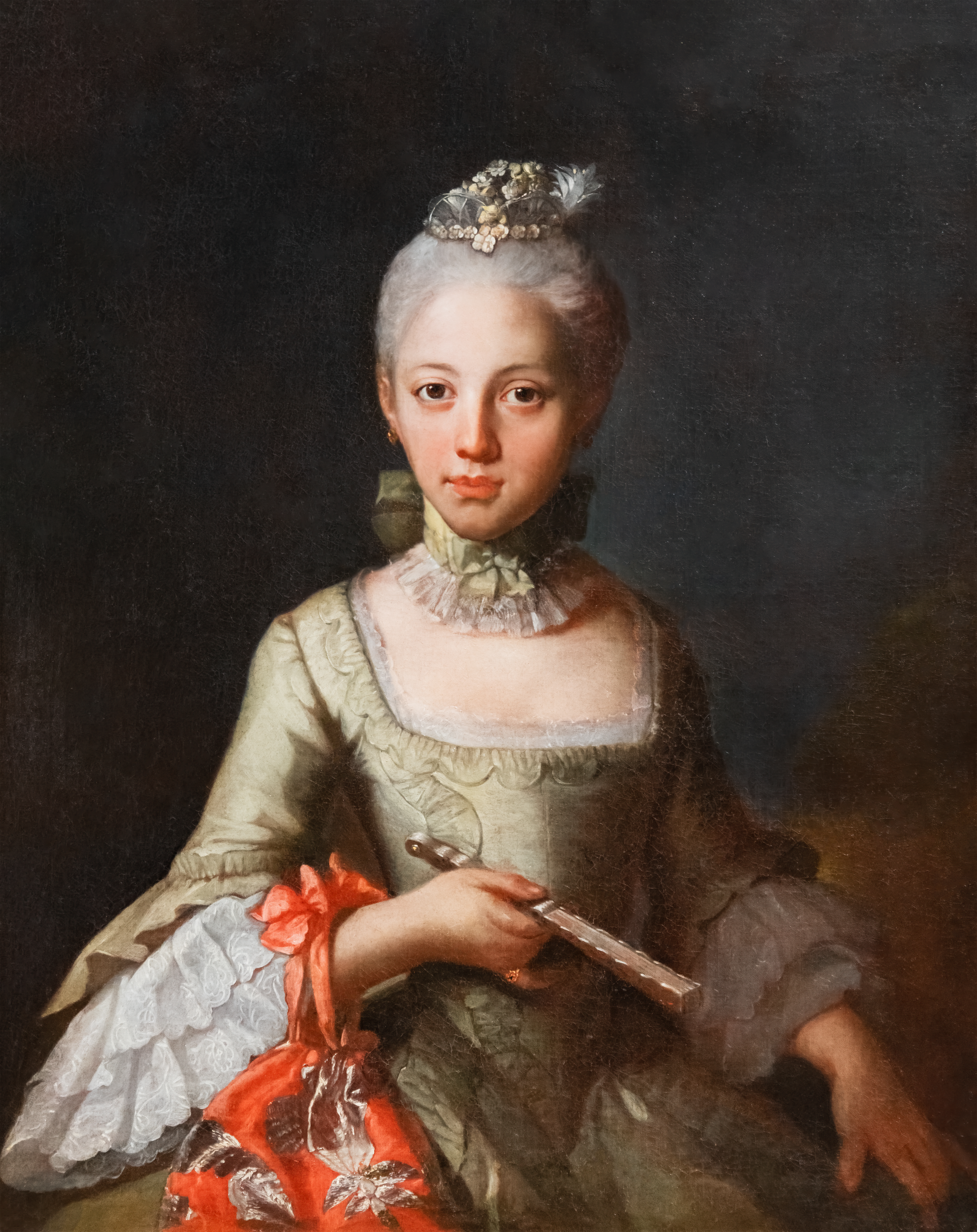
Portrait of a girl

== Bibliography ==
- Enggass, Robert (1970). "BONITO, Giuseppe". Dizionario Biografico degli Italiani (in Italian). Vol. 12: Bonfadini–Borrello. Rome: Istituto dell'Enciclopedia Italiana. ISBN 978-88-12-00032-6.
- Museum Network; legend for Bowes Museum piece.
- Biography.
