= Todi Columns =

Art installation by Beverly Pepper in Todi, Umbria, Italy

- Todi Columns
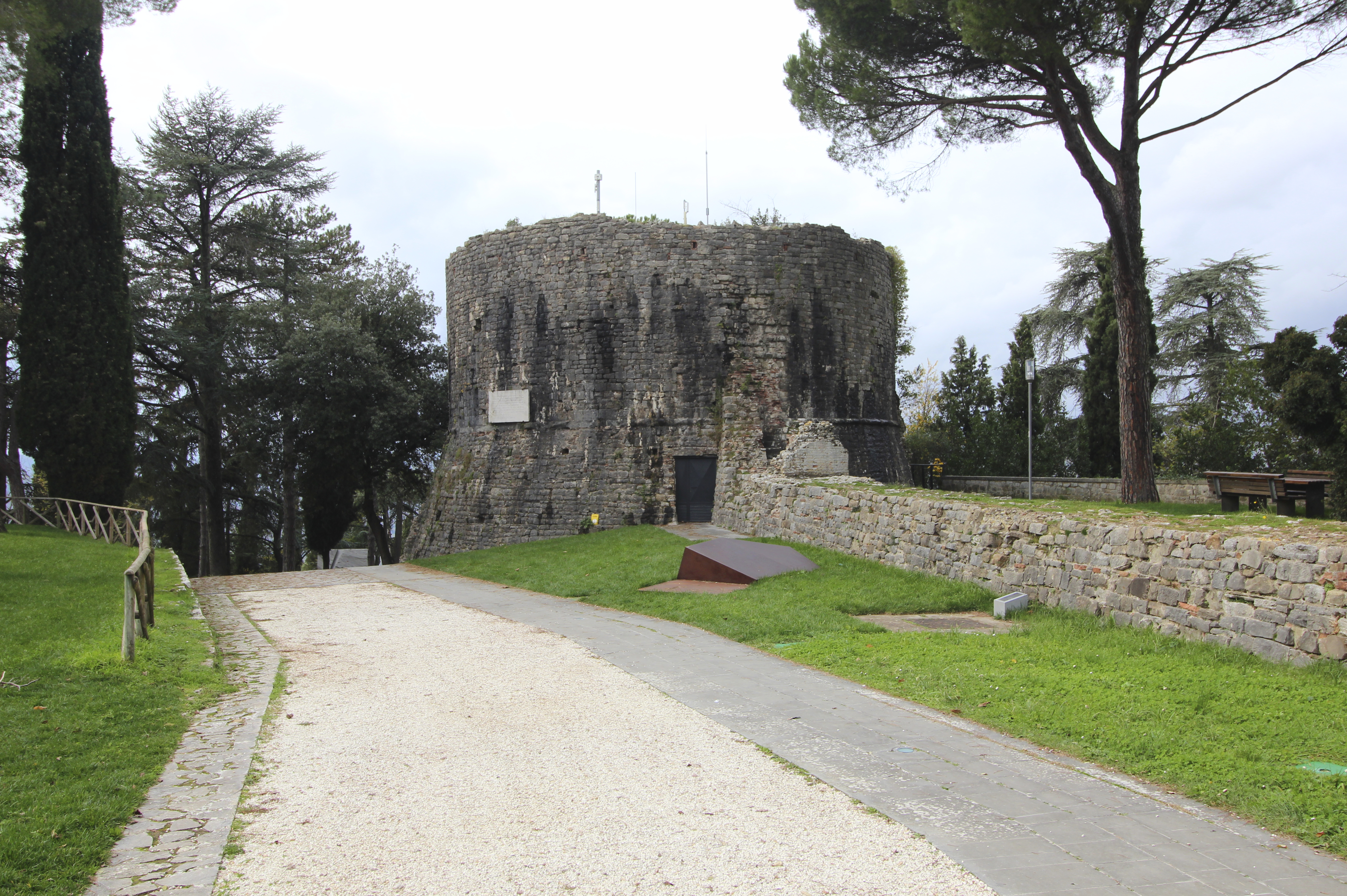
- Todi Columns are located to the left of this castle ruin.
- The location of the monument today Click on the map to see marker.
- Location: Parco di Beverly Pepper, Todi, Italy
- Coordinates: 42°46′47″N 12°24′14″E
- Designer: Beverly Pepper
- Material: Corten steel
- Beginning date: 1979

The Todi Columns are four Corten steel columns designed by the American artist Beverly Pepper, and now installed at the Beverly Pepper park located on Via Valle Inferiore #6 in Todi, region of Umbria, Italy. The site is part of the Parco della Rocca: a park built at the ruins of a 14th-century castle, of which a crumbling round former stone keep (donjon) rises a few yards from the columns. The park has a view south and east along a valley of the Tiber river.

== History ==
The Brooklyn-born Beverly Pepper, who had been living for some years in Torre Gentile near Todi, created the columns in 1979 as an exhibit for the Piazza del Popoli of Todi. The temporary installation in that central spot, contrasting with the early-medieval Romanesque and Gothic architecture quartet surrounding the piazza, consisting of the Duomo, Palazzo del Popolo, Palazzo dei Priori, and Palazzo del Capitano; the columns created local controversy. The columns are 33 feet high and weigh 2 tons each. They were briefly reinstalled in the piazza in 2019, to a more accepting reception. They have since been relocated to this park.

The 2019 review of Peppers works by By Megan O’Grady in the New York Times, recalls that the monoliths are relics not from the 1970s but the Iron Age, the kind of archaeological remnants that make you aware of your own minuteness in the larger human project. There is an ancient tradition in Italy of Victory columns, beginning with Ancient Roman stone monuments like the Column of Marcus Aurelius and that of Trajan, but is a tradition which has continued into our time with the restoration of Ancient Roman colunnades or the Catholic appropriation to erect guglia and columnar monuments such as the Column of the Immaculate Conception However, Pepper's influences may derive more from futurists and minimalists, and she was seeking with these rusty monoliths a more chthonic monument.

There appear to be two other permanent installations of these columns in the world:

- Spazio Thetis in the Venice Arsenal in Castello, installed as part of the Bienalle 2019.
- Stanford University arboretum.
