= San Luca, Pavia =

Church of San Luca
- Chiesa di San Luca
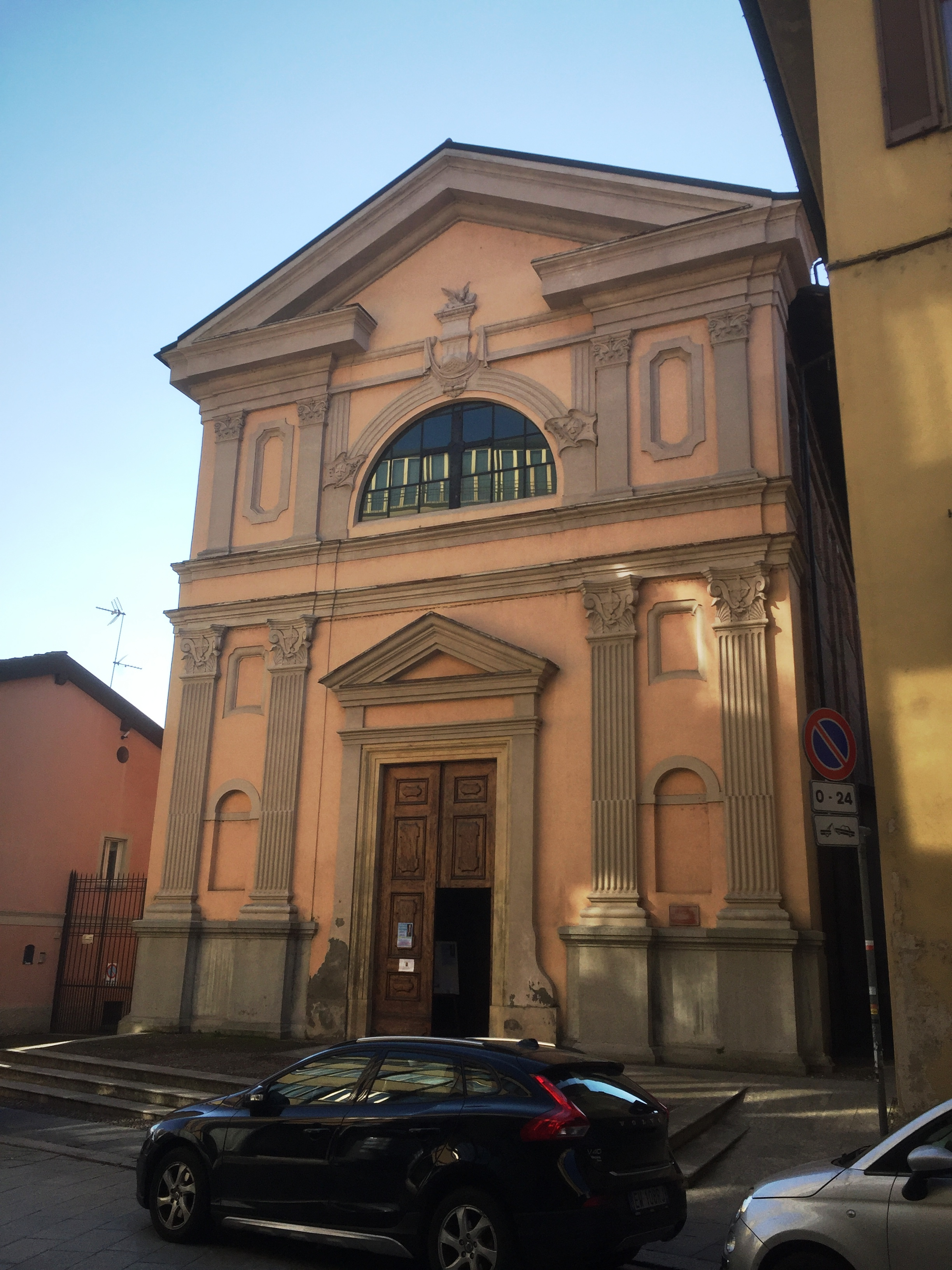
- Façade of the church
- Church of San Luca
- 45°10′53″N 9°09′42″E
- Location: Corso Giuseppe Garibaldi, Pavia, Lombardy
- Country: Italy
- Denomination: Catholic Church
- Tradition: Latin Church

History
- Status: Active
- Dedication: Saint Luke the Evangelist
- Consecrated: 1609

Architecture
- Style: Mannerist
- Groundbreaking: 1586
- Completed: 1619

Administration
- Diocese: Diocese of Pavia

The Church of San Luca is a Catholic church in Pavia, Lombardy, northern Italy. It stands on Corso Giuseppe Garibaldi, within the historic centre of the city.

== History ==
A church dedicated to Saint Luke existed in the area by at least the early decades of the fourteenth century. The building was rebuilt several times and, in the sixteenth century, was the seat of the confraternity of the Disciplini. By the last decades of the sixteenth century, the church was in poor condition; for this reason, a group of the faithful purchased land near the older building and built a new oratory there.

In 1586 Bishop Ippolito de' Rossi laid the first stone of the new building, which was consecrated in 1609, although the bell tower and sacristy had not yet been completed. The sacristy, fitted with valuable Baroque cabinets, was finished in 1611, while the bell tower was completed in 1619.

The church was designed according to the liturgical and architectural principles that followed the Council of Trent, emphasizing clarity, functional planning, sobriety and the absence of decorative virtuosity on the façade.

Unlike many churches, its façade faces north rather than following an east–west axis. This allowed the church to face the road leading to Porta Santa Giustina, on the route of the Via Francigena, making the building easily recognizable to pilgrims. A house was established on the western side of the church to assist and accommodate pilgrims; it was later enlarged in 1726.

The confraternity was suppressed in 1790.

The church remains in Catholic use. Mass schedules published for the parish area list a Sunday Mass at San Luca celebrated in Latin, or in the older Roman Rite, at 10:00.

== Description ==
The church has a single nave and is separated from the surrounding buildings by two narrow alleys. The plastered façade, preceded by a small churchyard, is late sixteenth-century in character. It is divided into two orders of pilasters and crowned by a large pediment. The capitals are decorated with crosses, an emblem of pilgrimage, while at the upper break in the pediment there is a low-relief figure of an ox, the symbol of Saint Luke.

The interior is enriched with numerous stucco decorations dating from the sixteenth and seventeenth centuries. The terracotta floor preserves the tomb slabs of members of the confraternity and its female associates. The walls are articulated by paired pilasters on high plinths, decorated with dense vegetal stucco ornament on a coloured ground. Above them runs a strongly projecting entablature, with an architrave decorated with metopes and triglyphs.

The church has six side altars, set against shallow side niches. They are decorated with twisted columns, vine shoots, broken pediments, bas-reliefs and statues, probably made by Ludovico Corte in 1625. The first altar on the right is dedicated to Saint Agatha and was commissioned in 1610 by the guild of weavers. Its altarpiece, by Carlo Antonio Bianchi, depicts Saint Peter Healing Saint Agatha. The second altar, dedicated to the Crucifix, has a later Baroque decoration different from that of the others. It was made in 1753 and preserves the wooden crucifix carried in procession to Rome by thirty-eight members of the confraternity during the Jubilee of 1750.

On the same wall is the altar dedicated to Saint Cajetan, originally dedicated to Pope Pius I, whose statue is still preserved at the top. The first altar on the left is dedicated to Saint Philip Neri and contains an altarpiece painted by Carlo Antonio Bianchi in 1754, depicting the Madonna and Child with Saint Philip Neri. The altar of the Virgin is the only one without twisted columns and is enriched by a painted early seventeenth-century statue of the Virgin.

The altar of Saint Raphael was originally dedicated to Saint Luke. Since 1819 it has housed an altarpiece depicting Saint Raphael and Saint Felicity, by an anonymous seventeenth-century Lombard painter, formerly in the suppressed church of San Giovanni in Borgo.

The frescoes in the choir, showing the Holy Trinity and saints distributed in niches, are seventeenth-century works by Giovanni Francesco Romani. Other frescoes were painted by Giovanni Battista della Rovere. Above the central door, Giuseppe Crastona painted the Holy Trinity and a Group of Pilgrims. The high altar, made of marble and decorated with statues of angelic figures, was completed in 1699.

The church also preserves a mechanical-action organ built by Angelo Amati in 1835.

== Bibliography ==
- Susanna Zatti, "L'architettura a Pavia nel XVII e XVIII secolo", in Banca Regionale Europea, ed., Storia di Pavia. L'età spagnola e austriaca, vol. IV, part II, Milan, Industrie Grafiche P. M., 1995.
- Susanna Zatti, "Le arti a Pavia nel XVII e XVIII secolo", in Banca Regionale Europea, ed., Storia di Pavia. L'età spagnola e austriaca, vol. IV, part II, Milan, Industrie Grafiche P. M., 1995.
- Luisa Erba, Cesare Repossi and Maurizio Ricci, San Luca in Pavia: la chiesa, la confraternita della Trinità, l’organo Amati, Pavia, Litoline, 1991.
