= Roberto Sanseverino =

Roberto Sanseverino or Roberto da Sanseverino may refer to:

- Roberto Sanseverino d'Aragona (1418–1487), Italian condottiero
- Roberto Sanseverino, Prince of Salerno (c.1430–1474), Neapolitan admiral
