= Francesco Antonio Picchiatti =

Italian architect (1619–1694)

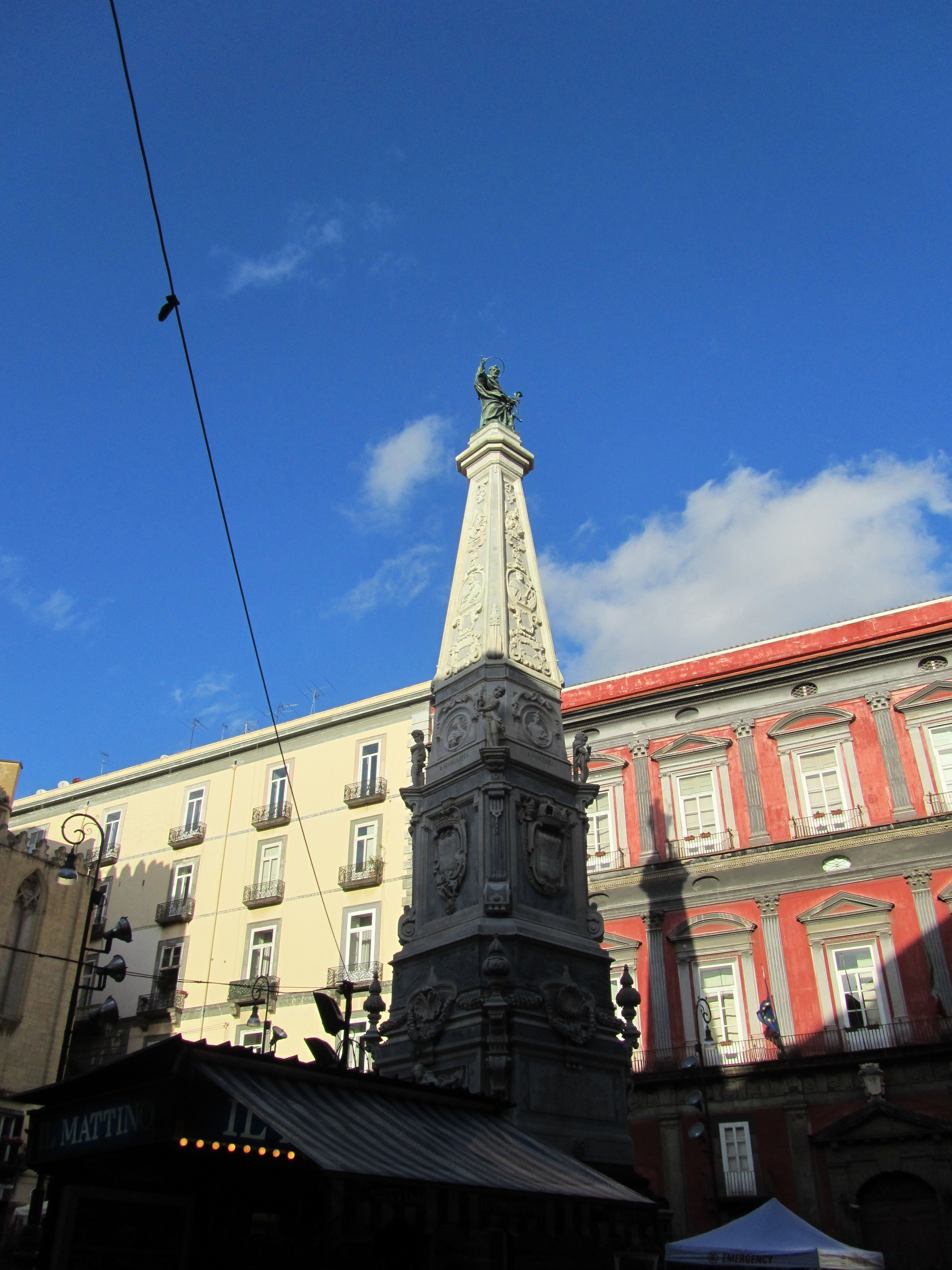
The Obelisk of San Domenico in Naples, one of his great works

Francesco Antonio Picchiatti (10 January 1619, Ferrara – 28 August 1694, Naples) was an Italian architect of the Baroque period active in Naples. He is also called Picchetto. He was son of Bartolommeo Picchiatti, who also served as an architect in Naples.

== Biography ==
Francesco Antonio lived nearly all his life in Naples and worked for various Spanish viceroys. He worked under Pedro Antonio de Aragón and was held in high esteem by the Marquis of Carpio, Don Gaspar de Haro, who was viceroy in Naples from 1683 to 1687. Francesco Antonio served this Marquis as an antiquarian and collector.

Francesco Antonio worked on a number of projects in Naples. He aided in the reconstruction of the church of San Agostino near the Royal Mint, the church of the Divino Amore, the church and Monastery of Santa Maria dei Miracoli and that of San Girolamo delle Monache, as well as Palazzo Cellamare.

He helped build, and with his father design, the circular church of Pio Monte della Misericordia, which contains Caravaggio's The Seven Works of Mercy.

He helped complete the Spire of San Domenico to a design by Cosimo Fanzago. Picchiatti was so intent on preserving and cataloging remnants of the original Greco-Roman city beneath the construction site that the work on the spire itself was eventually suspended and wasn't resumed until many years later.

He designed the convent of Santa Croce di Luca, begun in 1643. The convent stood at the extreme western end of the old historic city. It was demolished in 1900 to make room for the new Polyclinic hospital; a small section was left standing as an historical marker.

He also help design the cloister attached to the church of San Domenico Maggiore; when he died, the work was continued by his younger colleague Giovan Battista Nauclerio.

== Bibliography ==
- Blunt, Anthony; Alastair Lange; Christopher Tadgell (1978). Baroque and Rococo Architecture and Decoration. London: Elek. ISBN 0-06-430115-X.
