= San Domenico Maggiore =

Church of San Domenico Maggiore
- Chiesa di San Domenico Maggiore
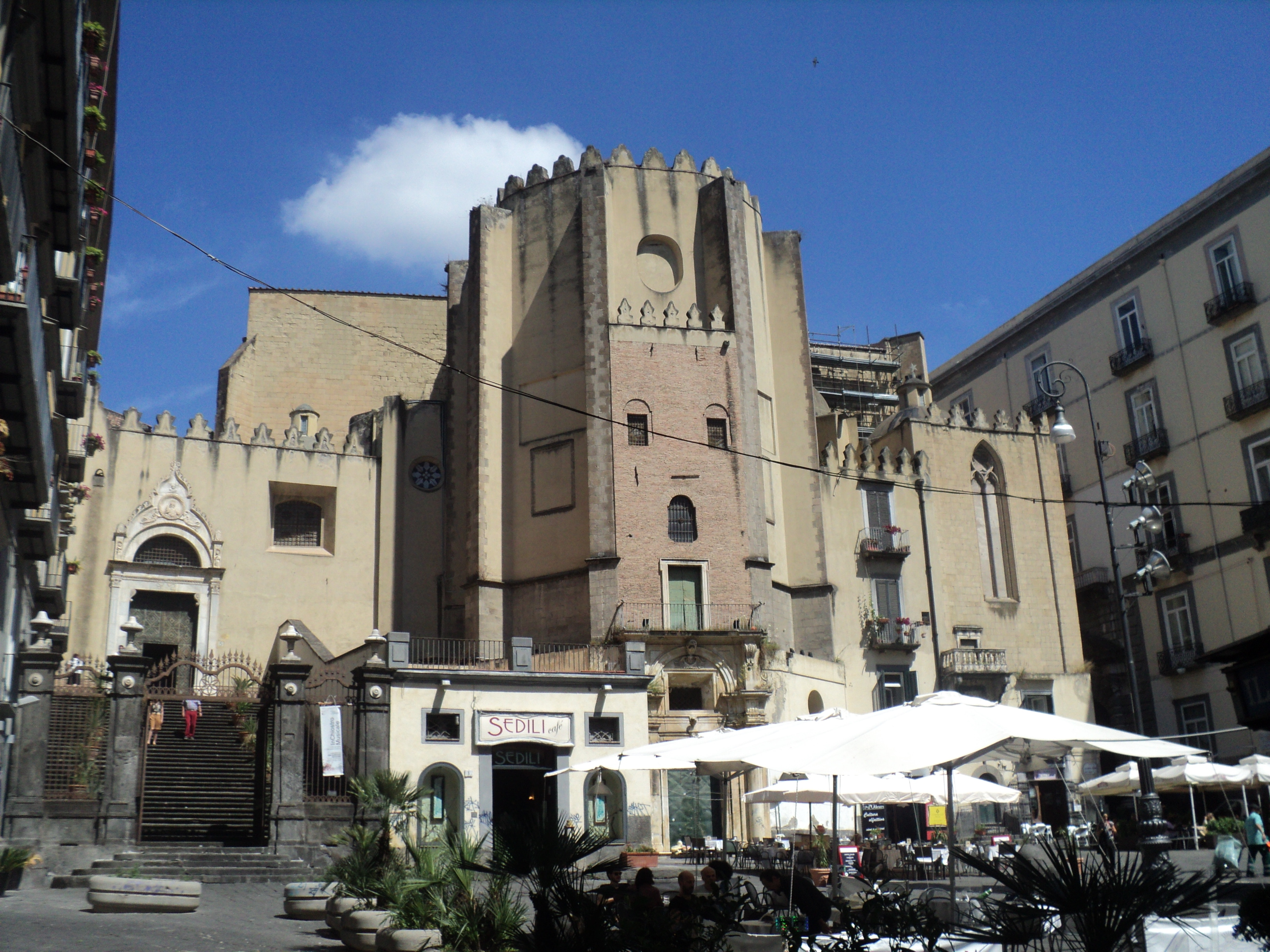
- The Church of San Domenico Maggiore in Naples (apse area).
- Church of San Domenico Maggiore
- 40.848731°N 14.254407°E
- Location: Piazza San Domenico Maggiore; Naples; Province of Naples, Campania
- Country: Italy
- Denomination: Roman Catholic

History
- Status: Active

Architecture
- Architectural type: Gothic architecture, Baroque architecture
- Groundbreaking: 1283
- Completed: 1324

Administration
- Diocese: Roman Catholic Archdiocese of Naples

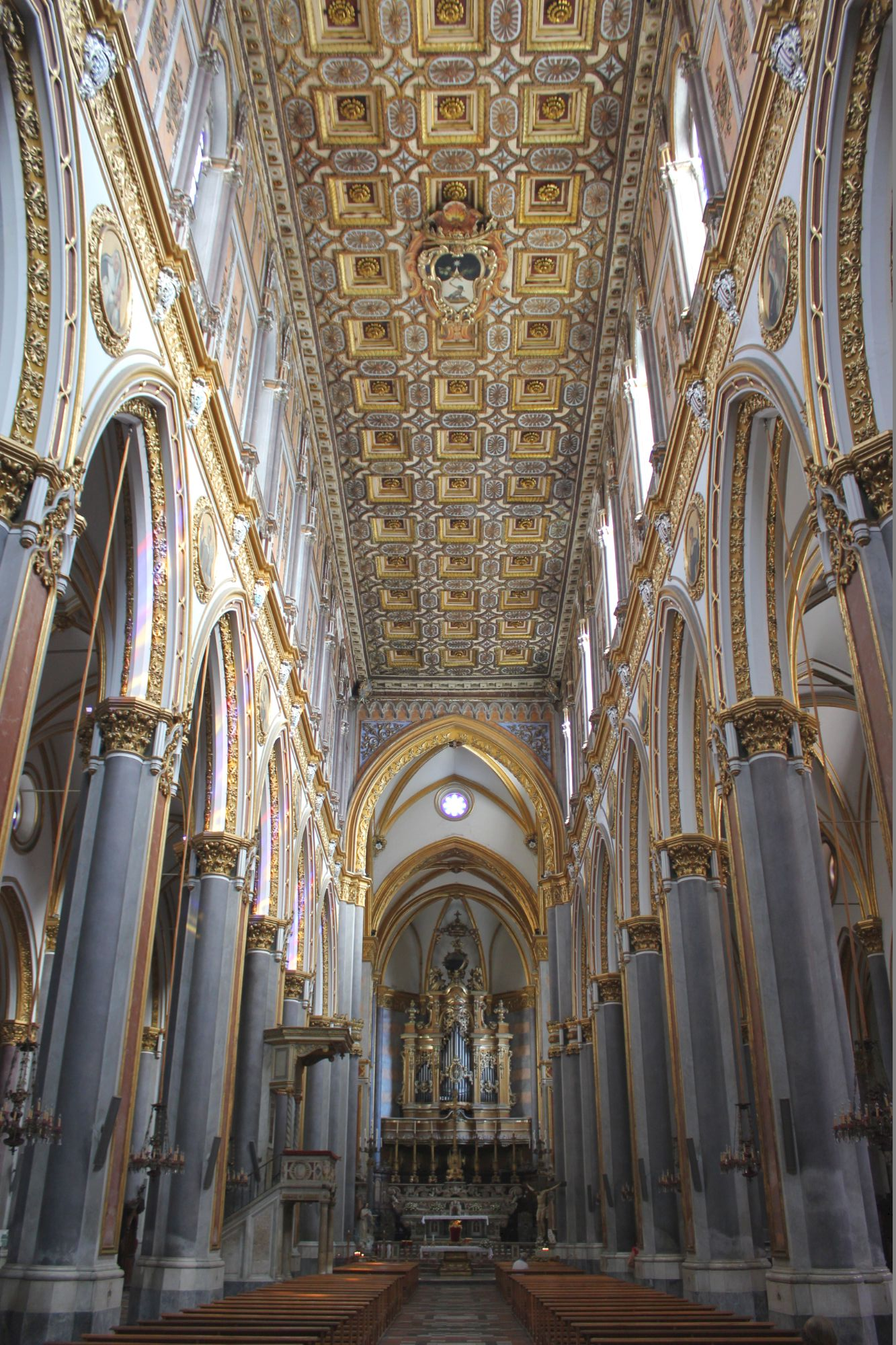
Interior.

San Domenico Maggiore is a Gothic, Roman Catholic church and monastery, founded by the friars of the Dominican Order, and located in the square of the same name in the historic center of Naples.

== History ==
The square is bordered by a street/alleyway popularly called "Spaccanapoli" (presently labeled via Benedetto Croce at this particular section of its considerable length) in the historic center of Naples. It was one of the three main east–west streets of the original Greek city of Neapolis. To the east along Spaccanapoli, one reaches in a few blocks the Piazza of Gesu Nuovo and Santa Chiara.

The Church of San Domenico Maggiore incorporates a smaller, original church built on this site in the 10th century, San Michele Arcangelo a Morfisa.

Charles II of Naples began the rebuilding that produced the Gotico Angioino structure that comprises the present church. The work was done between 1283 and 1324, but the church has undergone modifications over the centuries, including one in 1670 that recast some of the decoration in a Baroque style. In the 19th century, however, the church was restored to its original Gothic design.

The monastery annexed to the church has been the home of prominent names in the history of religion and philosophy. It was the original seat of the University of Naples, where Thomas Aquinas, a former member of the Dominican community there, returned to teach theology in 1272. Sacristan Domenic of Caserta claimed to have seen Aquinas levitating in prayer with tears before an icon of the crucified Christ in the Chapel of Saint Nicholas after Matins on December 6, 1273. Domenic reported that Christ said to Thomas, "You have written well of me, Thomas. What reward would you have for your labor?" and Thomas responded, "Nothing but you Lord."

The philosopher friar and heretic, Giordano Bruno, also lived here at some point.

In the center of the square is an obelisk— one of three "plague columns" in Naples— topped by a statue of Saint Dominic, founder of the Dominican Order, erected after the plague of 1656. The original designer of the spire was the Neapolitan architect Cosimo Fanzago. Construction on the spire was started after the plague of 1656 and was finally finished in 1737 under Charles III, the first Bourbon monarch of Naples.

Artistically, the most notable feature are the frescoes by Pietro Cavallini in the Brancaccio Chapel (1309), depicting Stories of St. John the Evangelist, Crucifixion, Stories of Magdalene and the Apostles Peter, Paul and Andrew.

The sacristy houses a series of 45 sepulchres of members of the royal Aragonese family, including that of King Ferdinand I. The remains of the Blessed Raymond of Capua, a former Master General of the Dominican Order, also rest there.

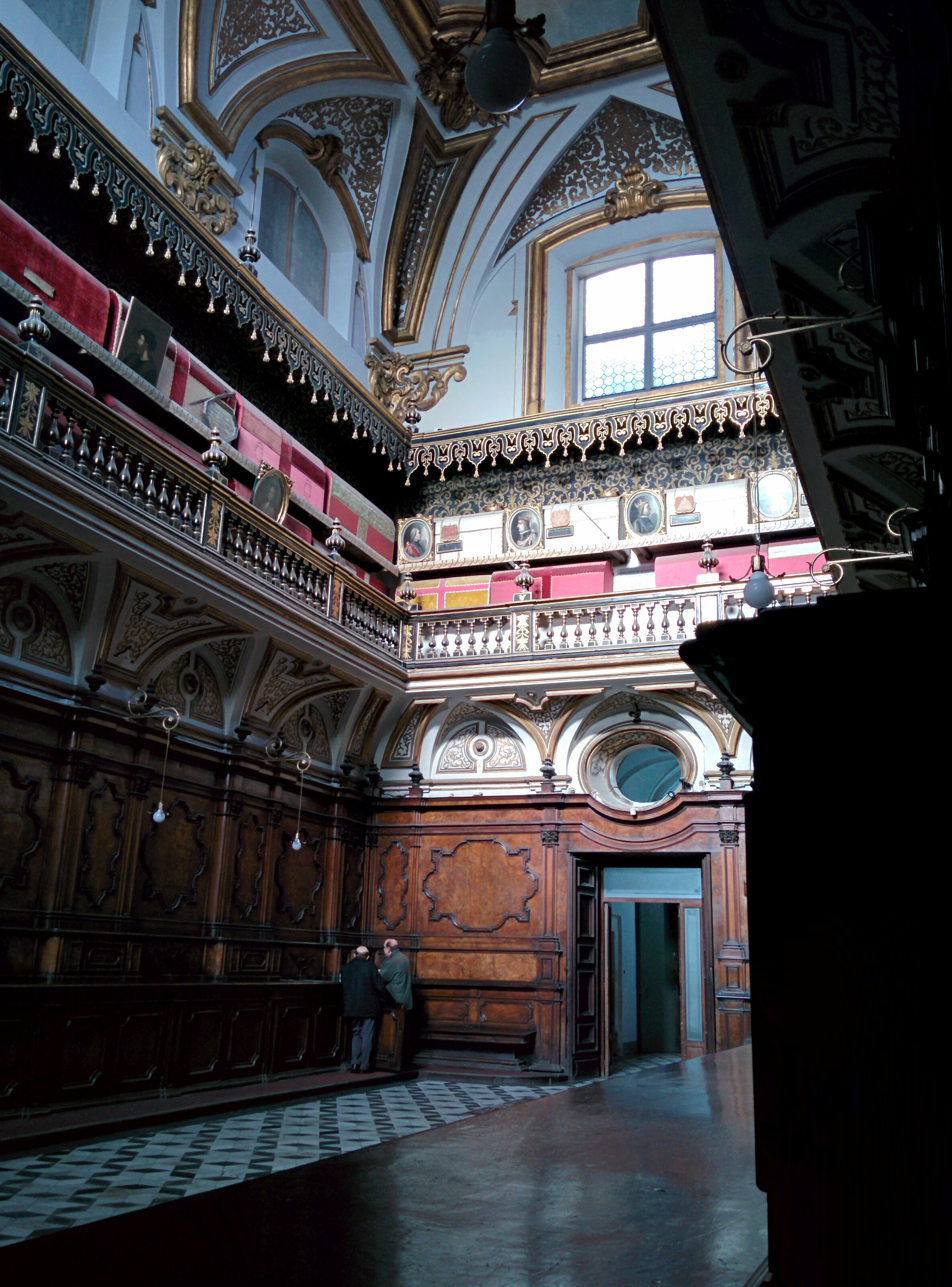
Coffins of members of the Aragonese royal family (covered in red, upper level).

== Burials ==
- Ferdinand I of Naples
- Isabella of Aragon, Duchess of Milan
- Ferdinand II of Naples
- Bishop Richard Luke Concanen, the first Catholic Bishop of New York City
- Cardinal Fabrizio Ruffo

== Sacred Relics Chamber ==
The "Sacred Relics Chamber", best known as "Treasure Chamber", was built in 1690 with the purpose of preserving the hearts of Charles II of Naples, Alfonso V of Aragon (Alfonso I of Naples), and Ferdinand II of Naples, as well as a series of significant objects belonging to Dominicans, all precious historical evidence lost during French occupation in the early 1800s. The chamber remained closed to the public until 2000, when it was re-opened, regaining a role as a cultural attraction in the historic centre of Naples.

It is accessible through the wooden door engraved toward the second part of the 16th century, and attributed to Cosimo Fanzago. It is furnished with monumental 18th century walnut wardrobes showing a collection divided in four parts: "The Arches", "The Processions", "the Treasure" and the" Sacred ornaments", a selection of precious clothes of Aragonese monarchs, reliquary busts, sacred vestments, and relics of Dominicans. The decorations of the wardrobes doors, realized by Francesco Antonio Picchiatti, embrace the same style as the terracotta tiled floor by Donato and Giuseppe Massa, who have also worked for the Santa Chiara cloister in Naples.

=== Aragonese Arches ===
The first part of the collection includes clothing and accessories of kings and noblemen removed by the arches shown in the adjacent sacristy. Toward the end of the 1980s, the clothes, which date back to a period between the 15th and 16th centuries, were taken away from the mummies in the coffins, restored, and exhibited. The culture of the 15th century is recreated by means of the damask dresses, veils and silk pillows, daggers and armor of the Aragonese family and of other members of their court.

The main relics are: the ivory pillow of Ferdinand I of Naples, called Ferrante (15th century), in silk and silver, on which a black gauntlet and the well-wishing family motto "juvat" are embroidered; the goatskin pillow and part of the sheath and dagger of Ferdinand II of Naples, called Ferrandino (15th century), with leather tassels and woolen padding. On this one, still today, the signs of the fire that burnt up the church in 1506 are visible; the ochre damask dress of Isabella Sforza of Aragon, with squared neckline and long silk ribbons to keep together the sleeves with the bodice. The skirt is 103 cm long and 480 cm large, with a grapevine decoration and a pleat that used to be stuffed with wool, so as to have a shapely waistline and match the fifteenth-century ideal of feminine beauty; the ivory satin suit of Peter of Aragon, with velvet ribbons and a gold velvet hat; the brown velvet suit attributed to Fernando Francesco d'Ávalos d'Aquino (husband of the 16th century poet Vittoria Colonna); the ivory dress in taffeta and grosgrain of Maria of Aragon and the flax turban found on her head; different vestments and shoes of noble children who mainly died from the plague.

=== The Processions ===
The second part, situated on the north-west wall, is characterized by some Dominican saints busts in papier-mâché, wooden and silver lamina, which were carried in triumph during the religious processions in the 18th and 19th centuries. Here we can admire the bust of Saint Vincent Ferrer, patron of the builders, the bust of Saint George, and that of Peter Martyr (Peter of Verona), represented with an axe on his head, recalling the way he was killed, according to the hagiographies, after his conversion to Christianity.

In the central wardrobes there are two refined flax drapes embroidered in silk and gold, part of a collection dedicated to the "history and virtues" of Saint Thomas Aquinas, donated to the Dominicans by his descendant Maria d’Aquino in 1799. The first drape portrays a young girl caressing a unicorn, a mythic creature which, according to the legend, could only be touched by a virgin, thus representing chastity. The other, on the opposite wall, "The Sun Chariot", represents an interesting subject mixing religious and mythological themes. The drapes were realized by Neapolitan embroiderers between 1669 and 1685, and were used, in the past, as wall decorations during some religious holy days connected with St. Thomas. The collection also includes other drapes, such as "Benevolence", "God’s grace", "Humility" and "Peace hugging Justice", all characterized by rich baroque flower compositions. The artists responsible for these works used a refined technique called "PUNTO PITTURA", to get a particular light and shade effect. On the north-east wall, others papier-mâché busts include: Saint Agnes of Rome, patron of girlfriends and virgins; St. Raymond of Peñyafort, the first doctor in canonical law; Saint Louis Bertrand, represented with a snake coming out from the goblet he holds in his hand, remembering the episode when he almost died from poison.

=== The Treasure ===
The third section conserves the most precious liturgical vestments owned by Dominican friars, a collection of copes and chasubles in multicolour silks, silver and gold linens, '700 century altar frontals, mother-of-pearl ornaments, reliquary, monstrances and candelabra. The most precious pieces of the collection are: the fantastic brocaded lampas cope by French manufacturers from 18th century, embroidered with silver thread and gold finishing; the peach tunic (end of 18th century), coming from the silk factories in San Leucio; a wonderful altar frontal (18th century) in brocade fabric embroidered with silver thread and multicolour silks on ivory satin, representing the Virgin Mary and Saint Dominic and "The Mysteries of the Rosary"; the reliquary finger of St Biagio, thaumaturge (wonderworker) of throat diseases.

According to a secular tradition, St Bonaventura entered Thomas' study while he was writing and saw the dove of the Spirit next to his face. Having completed his treatise on the Eucharist, he placed it on the altar before the crucifix to receive a sign from the Lord. Immediately he was lifted up from the ground and heard the words: Bene scripsisti, Thoma, de me quam ergo mercedem accipies? And he answered Non aliam nisi te, Domine (which means: You wrote well about me, Thomas. What reward do you desire? Nothing but Thee, Lord). The Treasure Room of San Domenico Maggiore houses a tapestry depicting the Chariot of the Sun, part of the Stories and Virtues of St Thomas Aquinas, donated to the Dominicans by Vincenza Maria d'Aquino Pico

=== Sacred Ornaments ===
The fourth and last section shows the objects which adorned the sacred places of the basilica in the past. Pieces of great visual suggestion are the two busts from the 18th century: one of Pope Pius V, promoter of the famous battle of Lepanto in 1571, and one of St. Dominic, founder of the Dominican order, represented according with the typical iconography: a star on his head, a dog running with a torch in his mouth, and a church.

Among the other items exhibited in this section: a rock crystal and golden bronze crucifix, fabulous wooden and silver lamina vases with mother-of-pearl flowers, and precious nineteenth-century candelabra in silver copper. All these relics prove the European leadership which Naples had gained in craftsmanship and handmade fashion sectors since Middle Ages. During the 16th and 17th centuries, silk was one of the most considerable entries in the kingdom's balance sheet, and the available data demonstrate that the silk production and trade activities were still significant for the economy of the Kingdom of the two Sicilies during the 18th and 19th centuries. Therefore, even in the "textile art" sector, Naples conserved its status of "Refined City" for a long time, and the Treasure Chamber proves this record beyond doubt.

== Piazza di San Domenico Maggiore ==
The plaza is ringed by palaces from prominent families, including the Palazzo di Sangro di Casacalenda, Naples.

== Bibliography ==
- Luchinat, Cristina (2009). Antichi telai : i tessuti d'arte del patrimonio del Fondo edifici di culto del Ministero dell'interno (in Italian). Roma: Fondo edifici di culto. pp. 30, 36–38. ISBN 978-88-7369-089-4. OCLC 635923322.
