= Gesù Vecchio, Naples =

Church in Naples, Italy

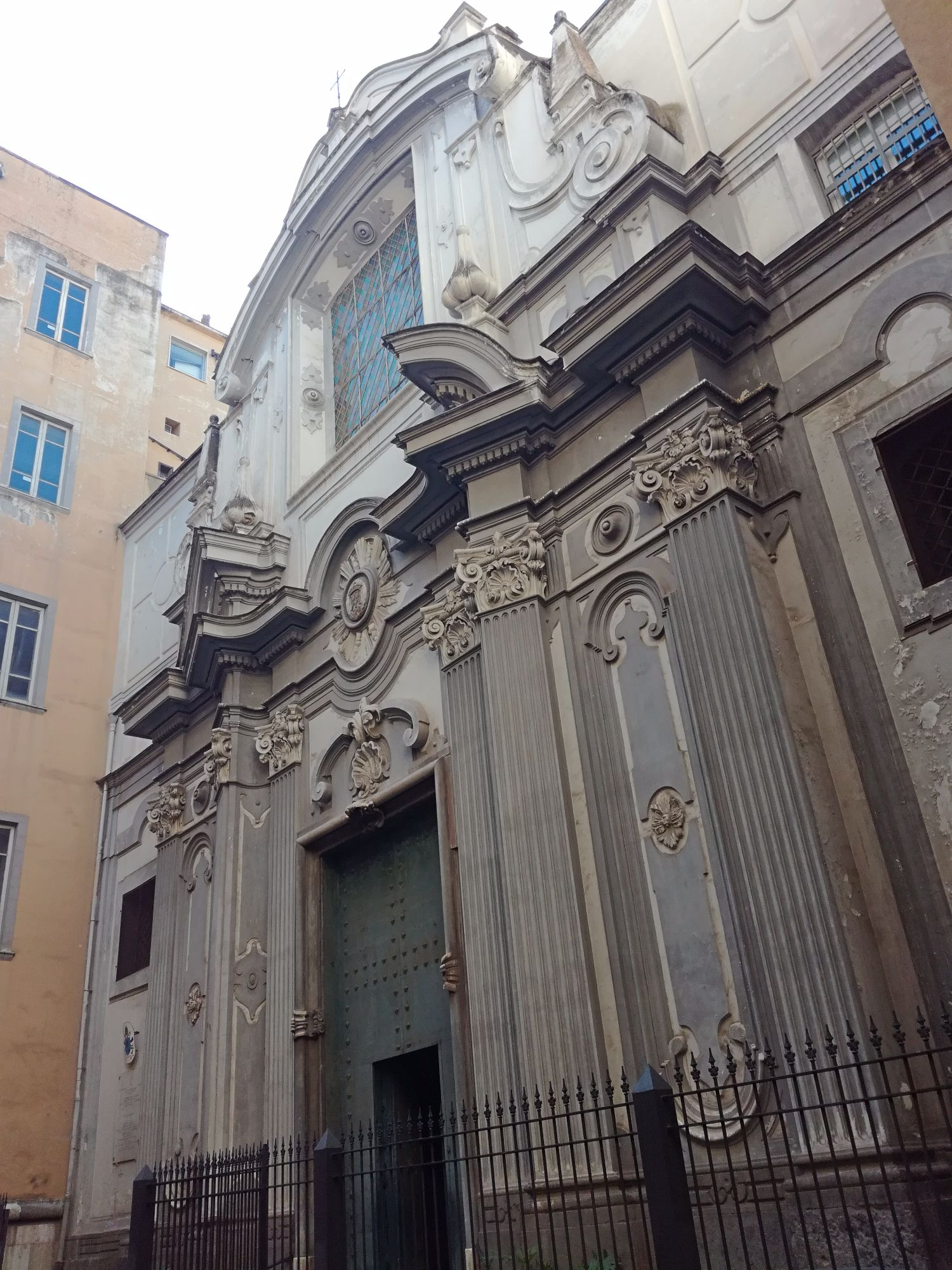
Facade

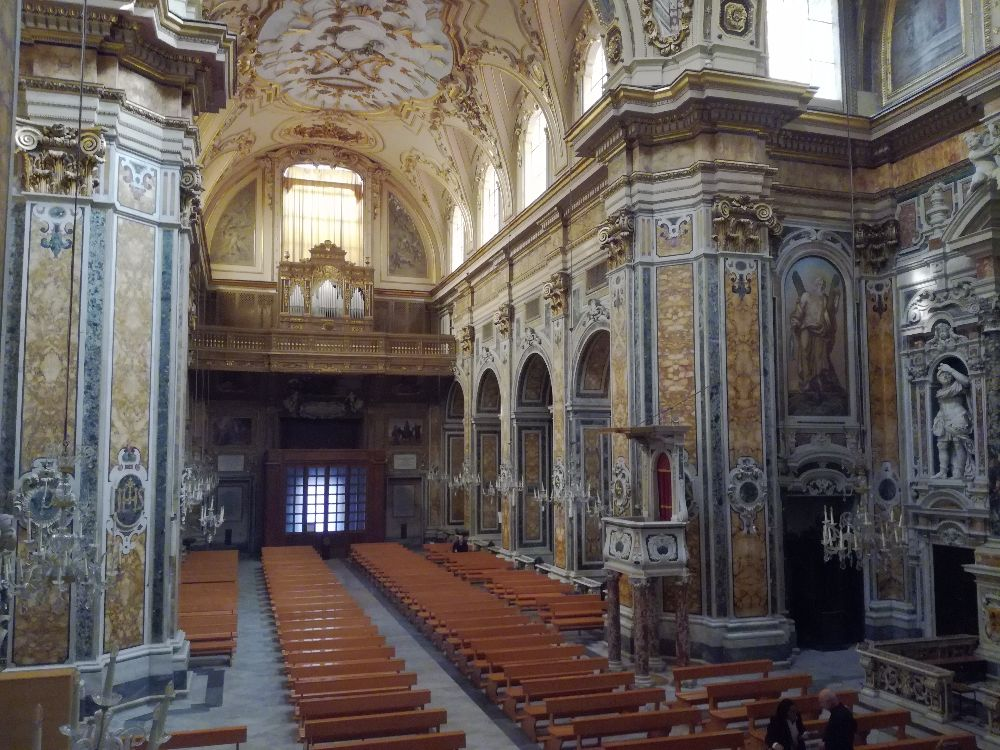
Interior.

The Gesù Vecchio is a church in Naples, Italy. Its full title is the Basilica Sanctuary of the Gesù Vecchio or Basilica Sanctuary of the Immaculate Conception and Don Placido. It was founded in 1554 and promoted to minor basilica status on 20 June 1958. Its name distinguishes it from the nearby Gesù Nuovo, built to cope with the expansion of the Jesuit order in the city.

In 2026, the church wil celebrate the 200th anniversary of the Pontifical coronation of the venerated image of the Immacolata di Don Placido. When the Pope presented the crown to the Church to honor the Virgin Mary, in 1826, it scandalized Protestant writers of the day, as the Anglican Communion had not yet clarified the concept of hyperdulia.

== See also ==
- List of Jesuit sites
