= Gesù Nuovo =

Church in Naples

Church of Gesù Nuovo
- Chiesa del Gesù Nuovo
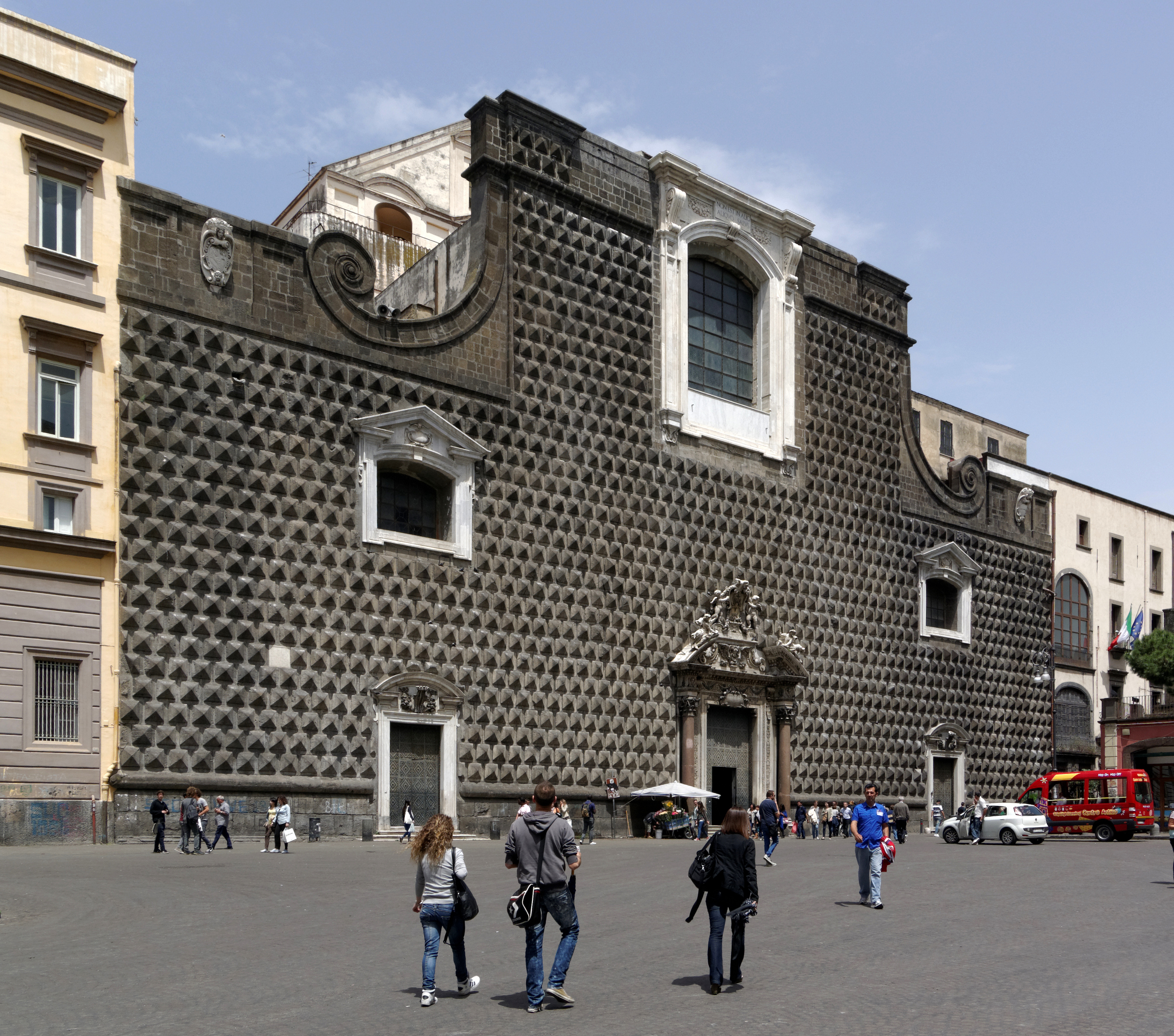
- The Church of Gesù Nuovo.
- Church of Gesù Nuovo
- 40.8473°N 14.2518°E
- Location: Piazza del Gesù Nuovo, Naples
- Country: Italy
- Denomination: Roman Catholic

History
- Status: Active

Architecture
- Architectural type: Church
- Style: Baroque architecture
- Completed: 1750

Administration
- Diocese: Roman Catholic Archdiocese of Naples

Gesù Nuovo ("New Jesus") is the name of both a church and a square in Naples, Italy. It is located just beyond the western edge of the city's historic center, facing a square which emerged as part of Naples' westward expansion in the early 16th century, under the rule of the Spanish viceroy Pedro Álvarez de Toledo.

Three notable landmarks can be found in the Gesù Nuovo square:

- The Church of Gesù Nuovo:
- The Church of Santa Chiara;
- The spire (guglia) of the Immaculate Virgin; to the southeast of the spire, one can see, just a block away, the Fountain of Monteoliveto and the piazza in front of the church of Sant'Anna dei Lombardi.

== Church of Gesù Nuovo ==
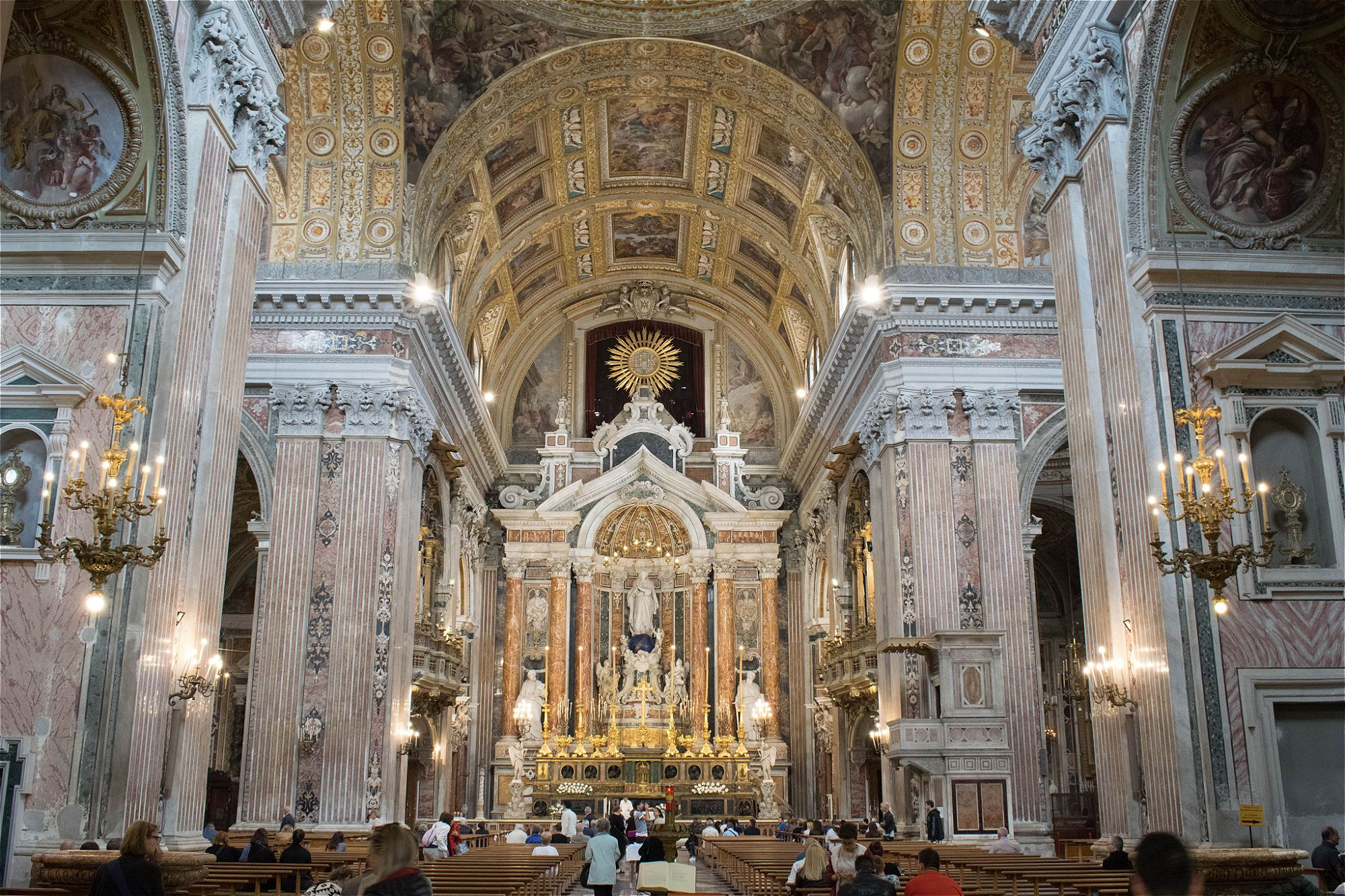
View towards main altar

=== History ===
The Church of Gesù Nuovo was originally a palace built in 1470 for Roberto Sanseverino, Prince of Salerno. The Jesuits had already built a church with this name in Naples, now called Gesú Vecchio. Political intrigues by the Sanseverino family caused the property to be confiscated, and eventually sold in the 1580s to the Jesuits for 45,000 ducats to construct a church (1584–1601) under architect Giuseppe Valeriano. The construction was also helped by local support including that of Roberta Carafa, Countess of Maddaloni. The adjacent gardens of Isabella Feltria, Principessa di Bisignano were also included in the construction. Construction of the church began in 1584. The new church retained the unusual facade, originally built for the palace, faced with rustic ashlar diamond projections.

When the Jesuits were expelled from Naples in 1767, the church passed to the Franciscan order. The Jesuits returned in 1821, only to be expelled again in 1848.

=== Art ===
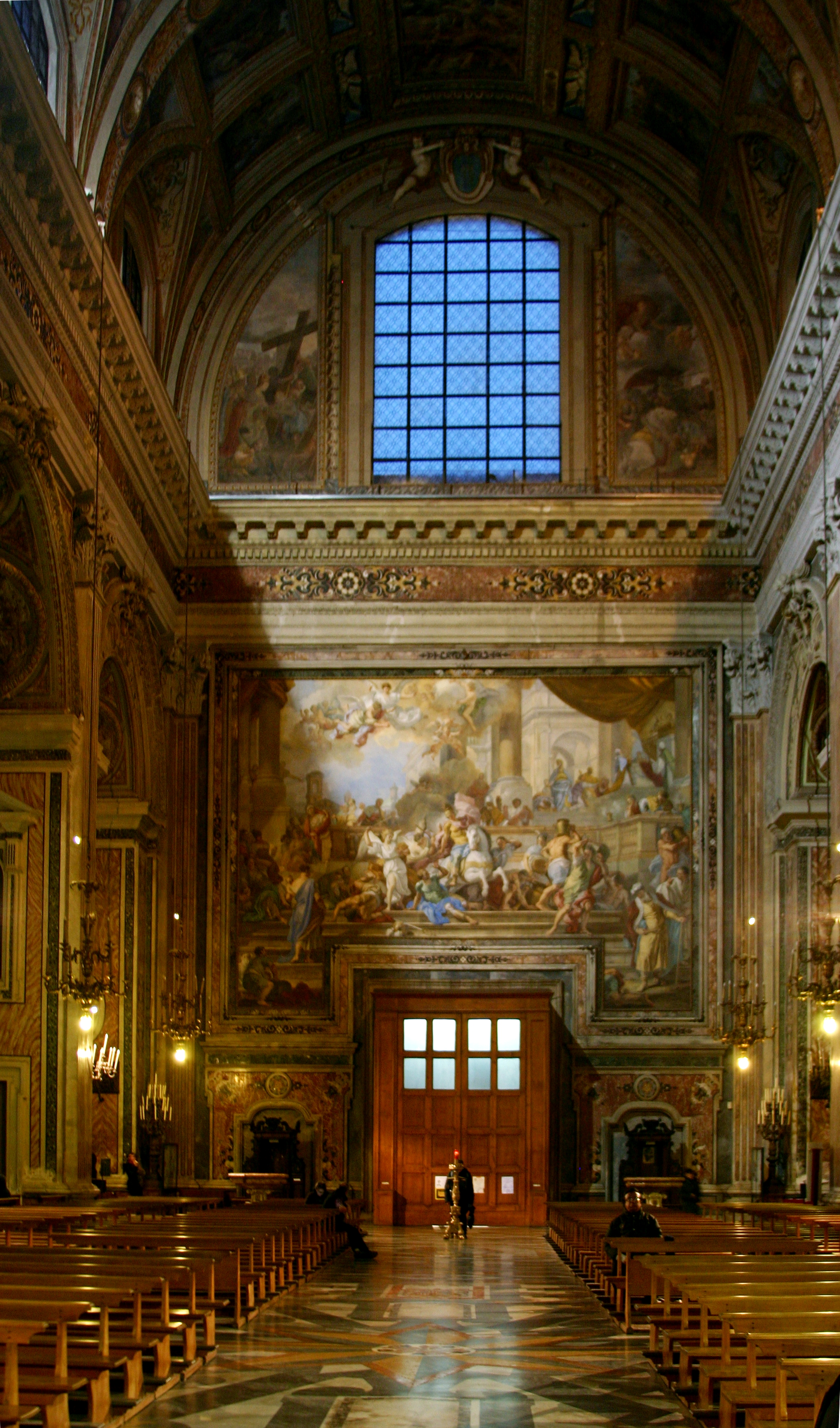
Entry, with Solimena's fresco The Expulsion of Heliodorus

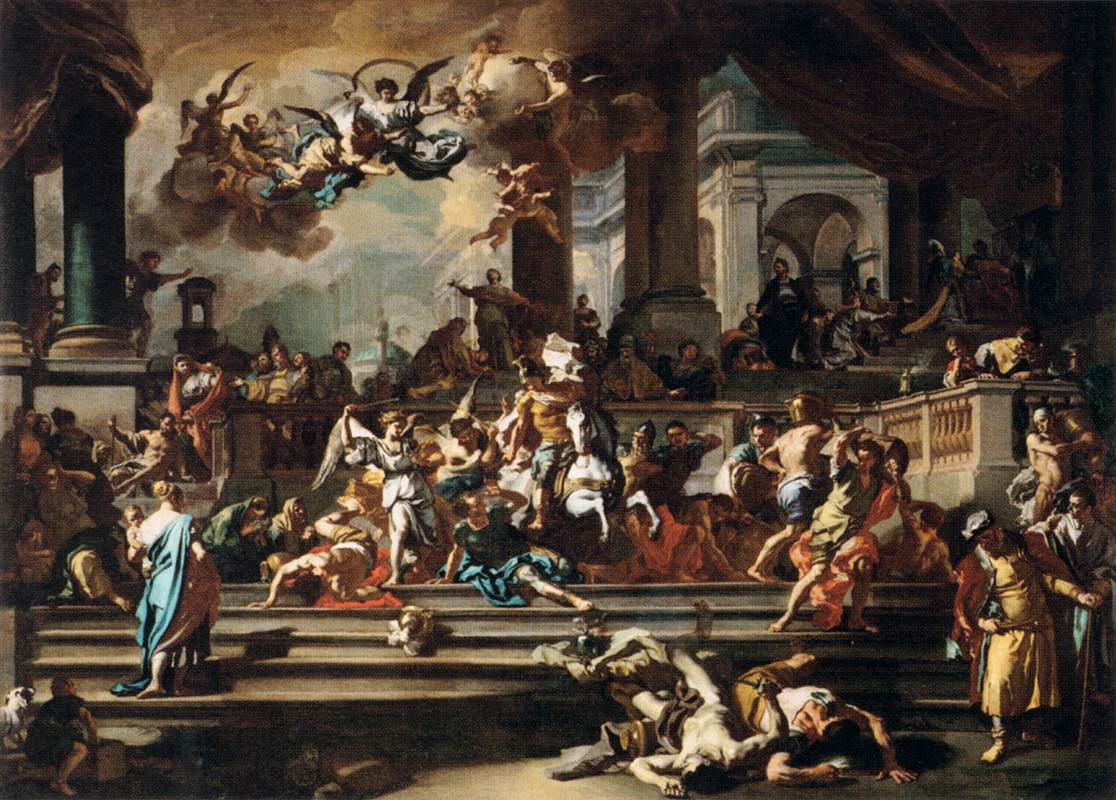
Solimena's preliminary sketch in the Louvre, Paris

The vault frescos, representing biblical and saintly narratives that exalt the name of Jesus, were carried out by Belisario Corenzio and Paolo de Matteis. At the back of the facade is The Expulsion of Heliodorus from the Temple (1725), a baroque masterpiece by Francesco Solimena. On the four pillars which support the dome are frescos of the four Evangelists, carried out by Giovanni Lanfranco. The inside of the dome had also been decorated by Lanfranco, but this was destroyed in the earthquake of 1688. Paolo de Matteis then repainted a new dome. The frescos of the life of the Virgin, placed on the second part of the vault up to the apse, are by Massimo Stanzione.

Surrounding the altar are three bronze bas-reliefs on a black marble base: on the left, The Supper at Emmaus (by Salvatore Irdi), on the right, The Promise of the Eucharist at Capernaum, and in the middle a reproduction of the Last Supper by Leonardo da Vinci. These last two bas-reliefs are by Gennaro Calì.

Above the altar, with didactic and historical symbols concerning the mystery of the Eucharist, are eight busts of saints who glorified the Eucharist. From left to right are medallions of Saints Juliana of Liège, Stanislaus Kostka, Thomas Aquinas, Francis Borgia, Gaetano Thiene, and the blessed Lanfranc of Canterbury. Gennaro Calì completed four medallions; the third and the fourth busts are by Costantino Labarbera.

==== Chapel of the Visitation ====
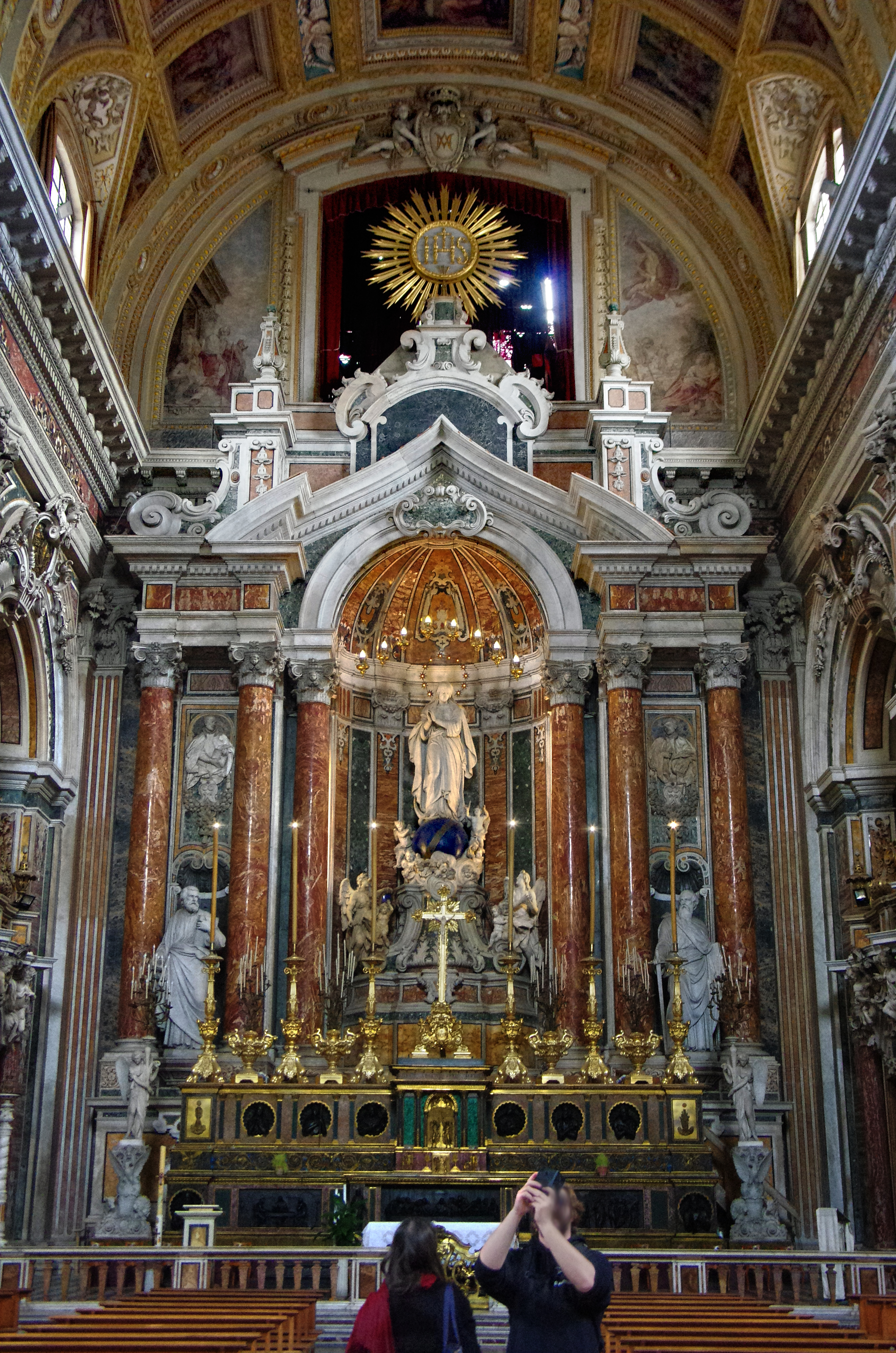
Main altar

The chapel of the Visitation has an altar-piece by Massimo Stanzione. Under the altar there is a bronze urn containing the mortal remains of St. Joseph Moscati (1880–1927), a biochemistry teacher at the University of Naples and head physician of the Ospedale degli Incurabili, canonized on 25 October 1987 by Pope John Paul II. His medical activities are shown in the triptych sculptured on the urn by Amedeo Garufi. The left panel shows the professor with his students, the middle the saint enlightened by the Eucharist, the right one the doctor, giving comfort to suffering and sick people at the Hospital. In 1990, a bronze statue of the saint, by Pier Luigi Sopelsa, was erected to the left of the altar.

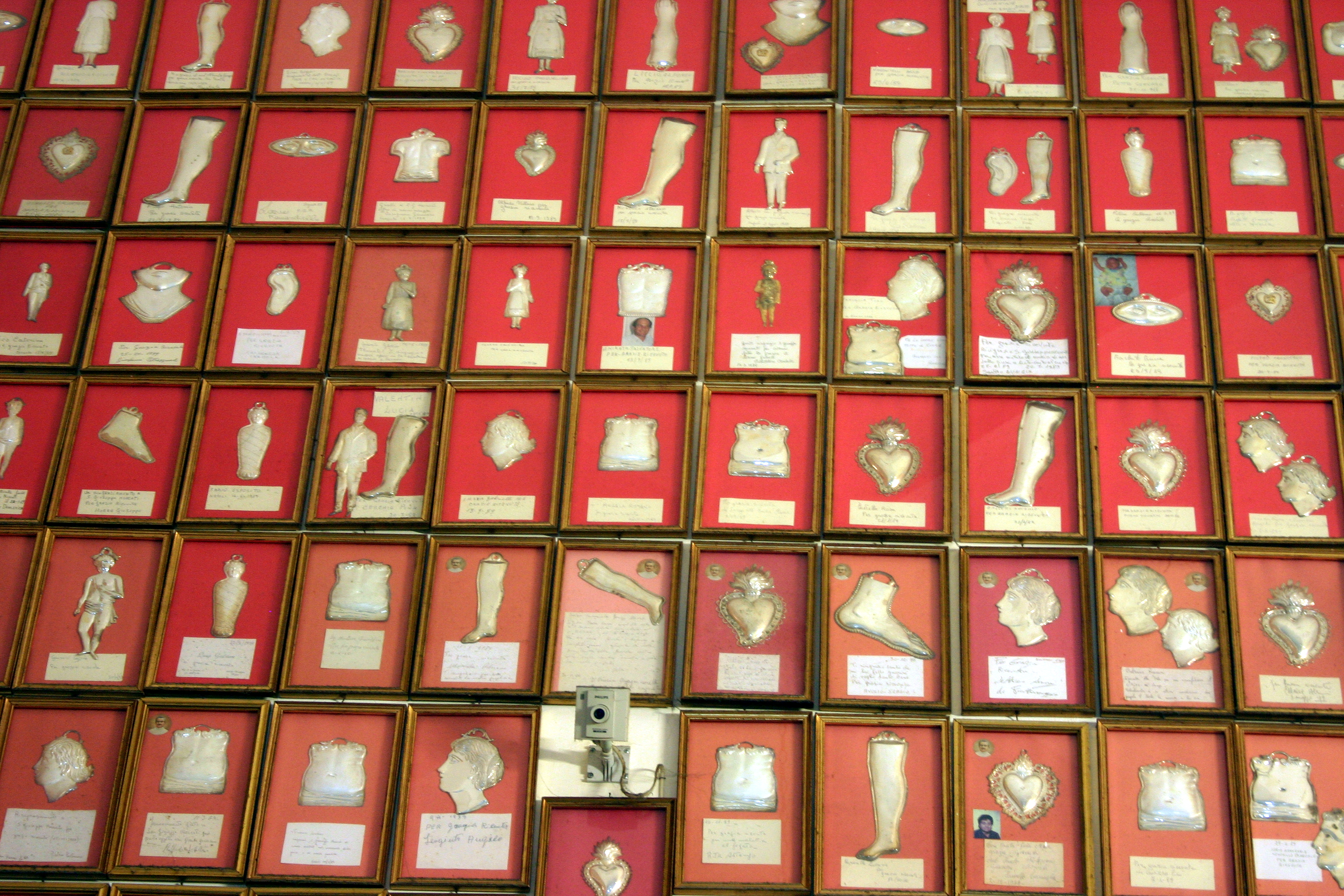
Ex voto in Gesù Nuovo church

==== Chapel of Saint Francis Xavier ====
In the chapel of Saint Francis Xavier, the altar-piece shows Saint Francis Xavier receiving a vision of the Virgin Mary, attributed to Giovanni Bernardino Azzolino. On the upper part, three paintings on the wall by Luca Giordano and the vault frescos by Corenzio and De Matteis represent episodes from the saint's life.

==== Chapel of St. Francis Borgia ====
The canvas placed in the chapel of St. Francis Borgia (1510–1572) is attributed to Sebastiano Conca.

==== Sacred Heart Chapel ====
At the end of the right aisle, there is the Sacred Heart chapel, once dedicated to the Holy Trinity. The frescos on the side walls were carried out by Belisario Corenzio. The picture representing the holy Trinity with Groups of Saints, whose author is Guercino, is now placed on one side of the chapel of St. Ignatius.

The altar-piece displays the Virgin with Child Jesus and 3 Saint Martyrs, attributed to Giovanni Bernardino Azzolino (1560–1610).

==== Nativity Chapel ====
This has an altarpiece by Girolamo Imparato.

==== Chapel of St Ignatius of Loyola ====
In this chapel are two statues of David and Jeremiah by Cosimo Fanzago. He also helped complete the decoration of the chapel, rebuilt after the 1688 earthquake. On the upper part, paintings by Ribera portray episodes in the life of the Saint: when he received the rules of the order from the Virgin, when he received approval of the order from Pope Paul II, and a glorification of the Saint. The vault frescos, with episodes from St. Ignatius’s life by De Matteis. The Prince of Venosa, Carlo Gesualdo, who was a famous composer and infamous murderer of his wife and her lover, is buried in front of the St. Ignatius Chapel.

==== Chapel of the Crucifix ====
The chapel has a wooden statue of Christ crucified, with the Blessed Virgin and St. John, sculpted by Francesco Mollica, a pupil of Michelangelo Naccherino. The Angels holding Veronica's Veil were painted b the school of Vaccaro. The ceiling frescos with the Story of Christ were painted by Giovanni Battista Benaschi, and retouched by Petronsio. Benaschi also painted the triangular lunettes on the altar.

The two imposing side Reliquaries, with 70 busts of saint martyrs in golden wood, were made in the most part in 1617 by the Neapolitan woodcarver Giovan Battista Gallone.

The Sacristy contains frescos by Aniello Falcone. The Lavabo, at the back, is a work in polychrome marbles made by Dionisio Lazzari.

== The Church of Santa Chiara ==
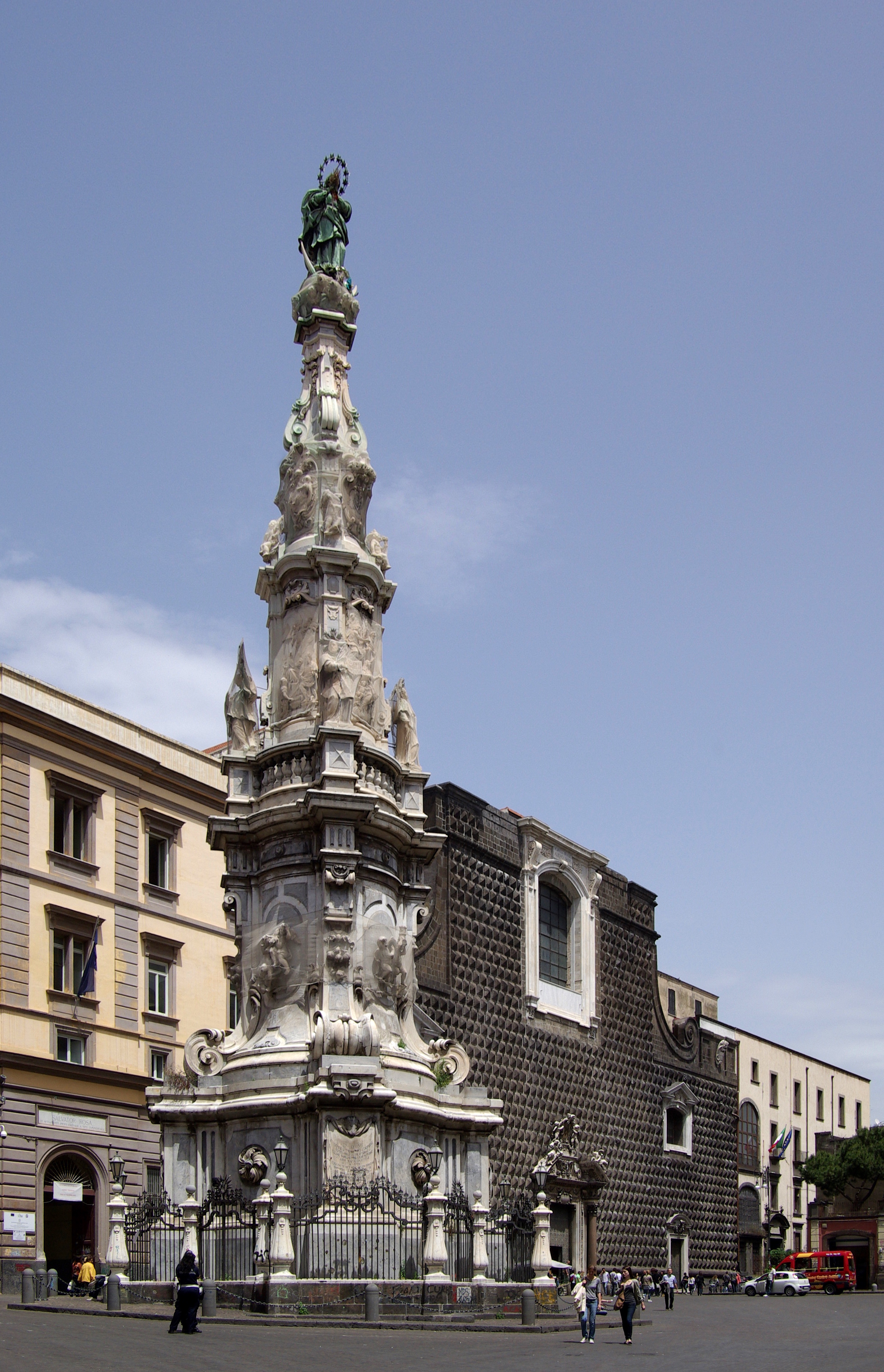
The Spire of the Immaculate Virgin.

The Church of Santa Chiara is a Gothic style church-convent built between 1310 and 1328 for the wife of Robert, King of Naples. It has a belfry that stands within the grounds at the northeast corner. The complex retains the citadel-like walls setting it apart from the outside world. The walls contained a vast religious community, and today contain the more modest convent of the Poor Clares and a community of the Grey Friars. The complex was expanded along Baroque architecture lines in the 18th century. It was almost entirely destroyed by bombing in WW II and was restored to its original Gothic form in 1953. The noteworthy monastic courtyard at the rear of the church is the result of renovation carried out by Domenico Antonio Vaccaro in the 1730s, for Maria Amalia of Saxony, wife of Charles III of Bourbon, King of Naples. The majolica tilework is characteristic of the school of Neapolitan ceramic from that period and was crafted by Donato Massa and his son, Giuseppe.

== Spire or Guglia of the Immaculate Virgin ==
The Guglia dell'Immacolata is a monument that stands in the square in front of the church of Gesù Nuovo. It is the tallest and most ornamental of three such "plague columns" in Naples. Putatively, it was built to invoke the Virgin Mary's protection from the plague. Begun in the 17th century, it was completed only in 1750 after decades of pauses in construction. Sculptors Francesco Pagani and Matteo Bottiglieri worked on the rich Baroque decoration, prototypic of Neapolitan Baroque. It contains bas-relief depictions of the Presentation of Jesus at the Temple, the Birth of the Virgin Mary and the Annunciation.

== See also ==
- List of Jesuit sites
