= San Girolamo delle Monache =

Church in Italy

Coordinates: 40.847219°N 14.255491°E

San Girolamo delle Monache is a Roman Catholic church located on Via Mezzocannone in the Quartiere Porto of the historic center of Naples, Italy.

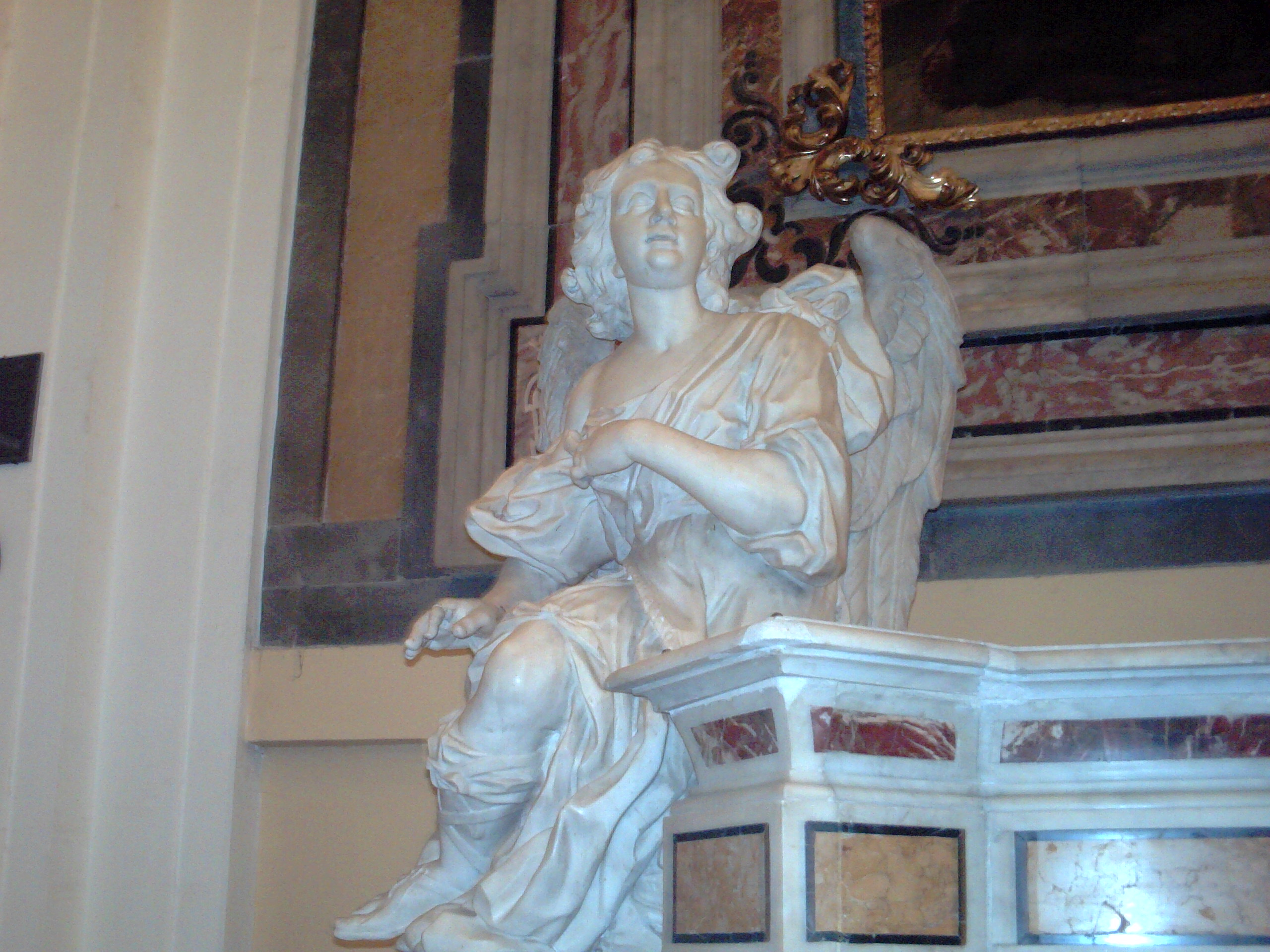
Particular of marble sculpture

.

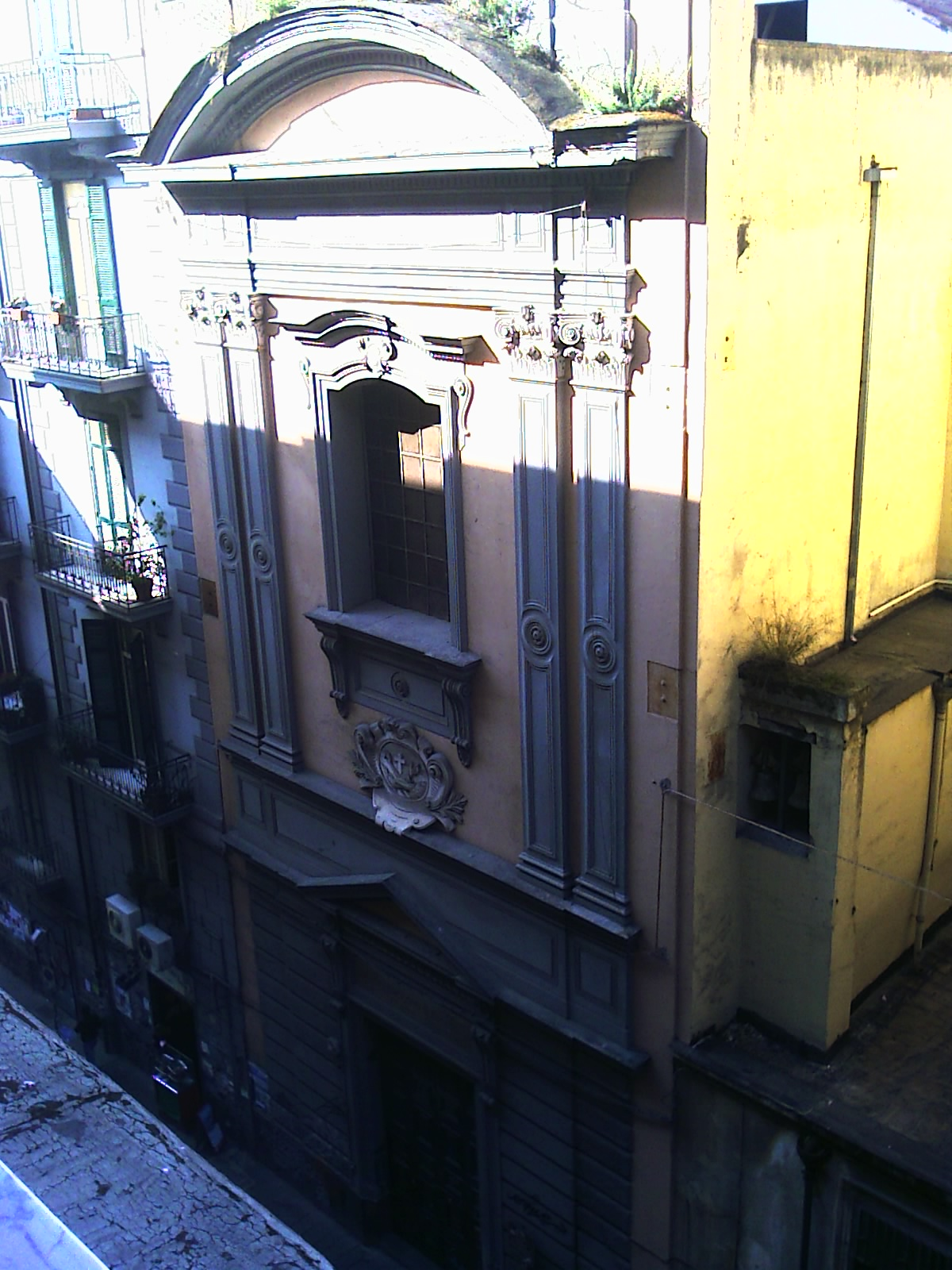
Facade

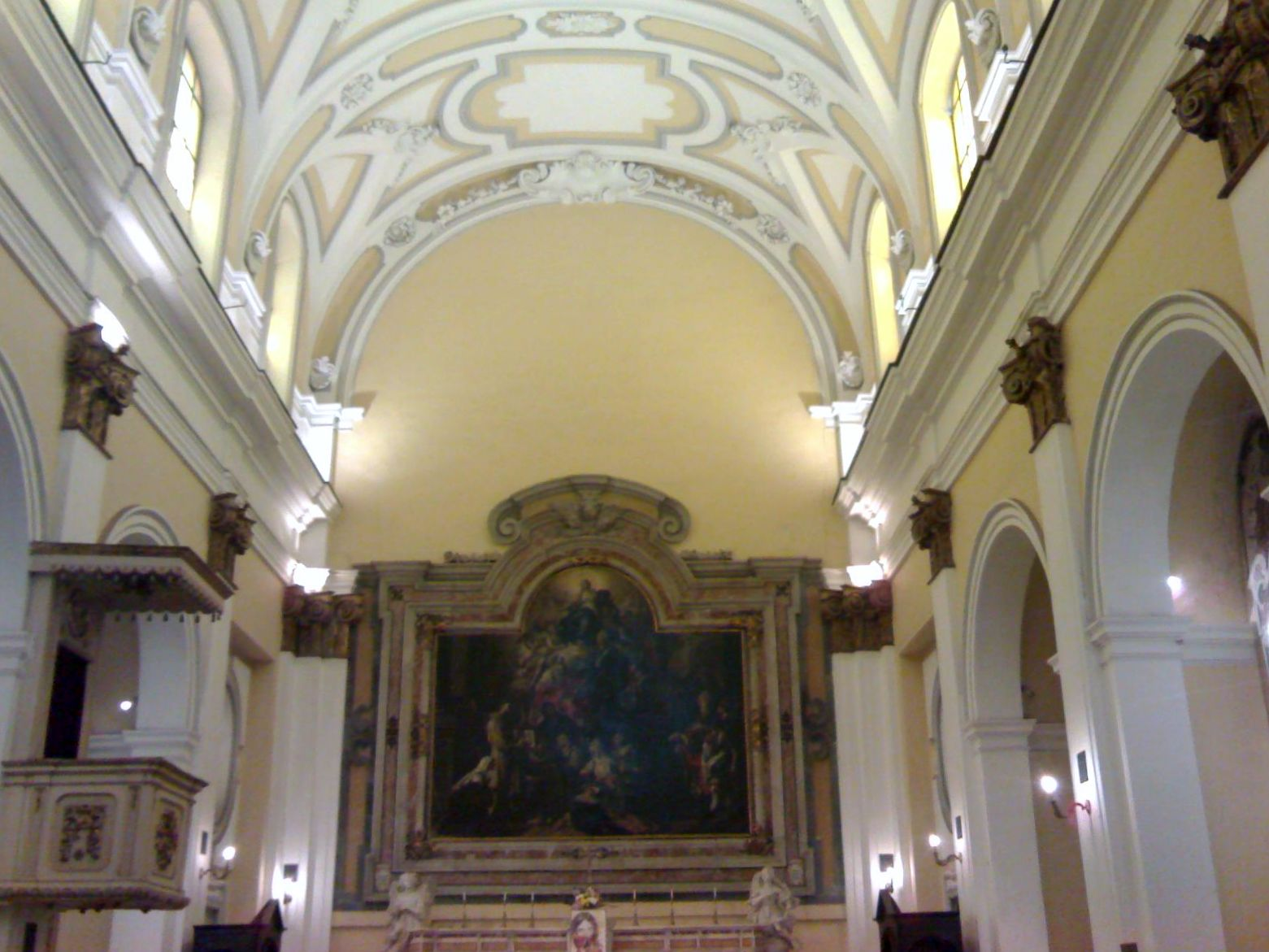
Nave with painting, Assumption Glory of Mary with Saints, by Francesco Solimena

== History ==
The church was founded in 1434, but little of the medieval structure remains. Numerous reconstructions, most recently 1992, have altered the plan. The original entrance was on the opposite side; the canvas of Solimena was on the counterfacade. With the alterations in city streets, the church was altered, and left with a simple facade. In the interior, on the right is visible a spherical shrapnel walled into the external facade during the bombardment of World War II. The polychrome altar has been stripped of some of its sculptural and painted decoration, it retains two 16th-century bas-reliefs representing Motherhood. The main altar hosts a large canvas by Francesco Solimena depicting the Glory of Mary with Saints (circa 1705).

== Bibliography ==
- Napoli sacra. Guida alle chiese della città, coordinamento scientifico di Nicola Spinosa; curated by Gemma Cautela, Leonardo Di Mauro, Renato Ruotolo, Naples, Italy 1993–1997, 15 fascicoli.
