= Roberto Sanseverino, Prince of Salerno =

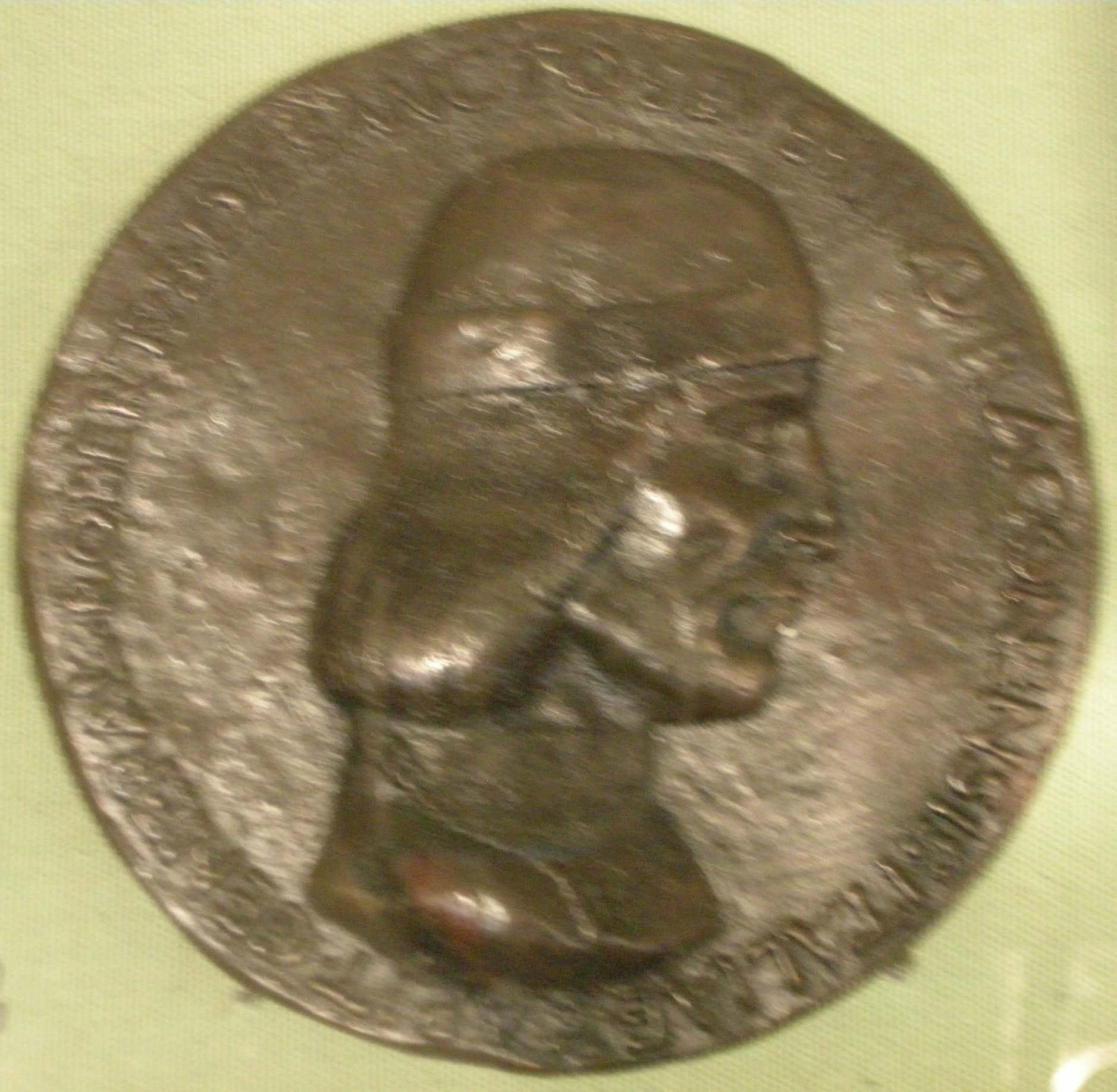
Roberto di sanseverino, c.1486

Roberto Sanseverino (c. 1430 – 2 December 1474) was an Italian nobleman and admiral of the Kingdom of Naples. He was the first prince of Salerno from 1463, as well as the count of Marsica and Sanseverino, baron of Cilento and lord of Agropoli and Castellabate.

== Biography ==
At the death of his father, Roberto inherited the family fiefs. Later, he received from King Ferdinand I of Naples the principality of Salerno (1463). In 1470, in Naples, he started the construction of the rusticated Sanseverino Palace, which would later become the church of Gesù Nuovo.

He was named Grand Admiral of the Kingdom of Naples. During the war between Aragonese and Angevines, also known as the Conspiracy of the Barons which broke out in 1460, he was wounded in the battle of Sarno. After a momentarily alliance with the Angevines, he sided again for the Aragonese, fighting against the Orsini near Cosenza and conquering Salerno in 1461. As commander of their fleet, on 7 July 1465, he was victorious with Alessandro Sforza in the battle of Ischia against John II of Lorraine, who had occupied the island.

Roberto Sanseverino was a patron of the arts, having novelist Masuccio Salernitano and Luigi Pulci at his service.

He married Raimondina Del Balzo Orsini, who gave him three children. His son Ferdinando Sanseverino was also prince of Salerno and a condottiero. His other son and heir Antonello (it), considered the second prince of Salerno, was one of the leaders of the Conjure of the Barons against the Aragonese. His great grandson Ferdinando Sanseverino was the fourth and last prince of Salerno and a condottiero.
