= Spires of Naples =

Monumental Columns in Naples, Italy

The Spires of Naples ("spire" in Italian: guglia; plural, guglie) are monumental columns in the historic center of the city of Naples, Italy.

These plague columns were built to celebrate the end of, or deliverance from, the plague. The columns may also be termed votive Marian and Holy Trinity columns, and could also be connected with non-pestilent calamities such as earthquakes or eruptions, or simply manifest faith, atonement, or expiation. The columns are generally named for the religious votive icon at the top. Most remaining columns were built in Catholic countries throughout Europe in the 17th and 18th centuries. Their heavy ornateness characterizes Baroque architecture. In Naples, by chronological order of date of completion, three main spires can be found, as follows:

Guglie (Spires) in Naples

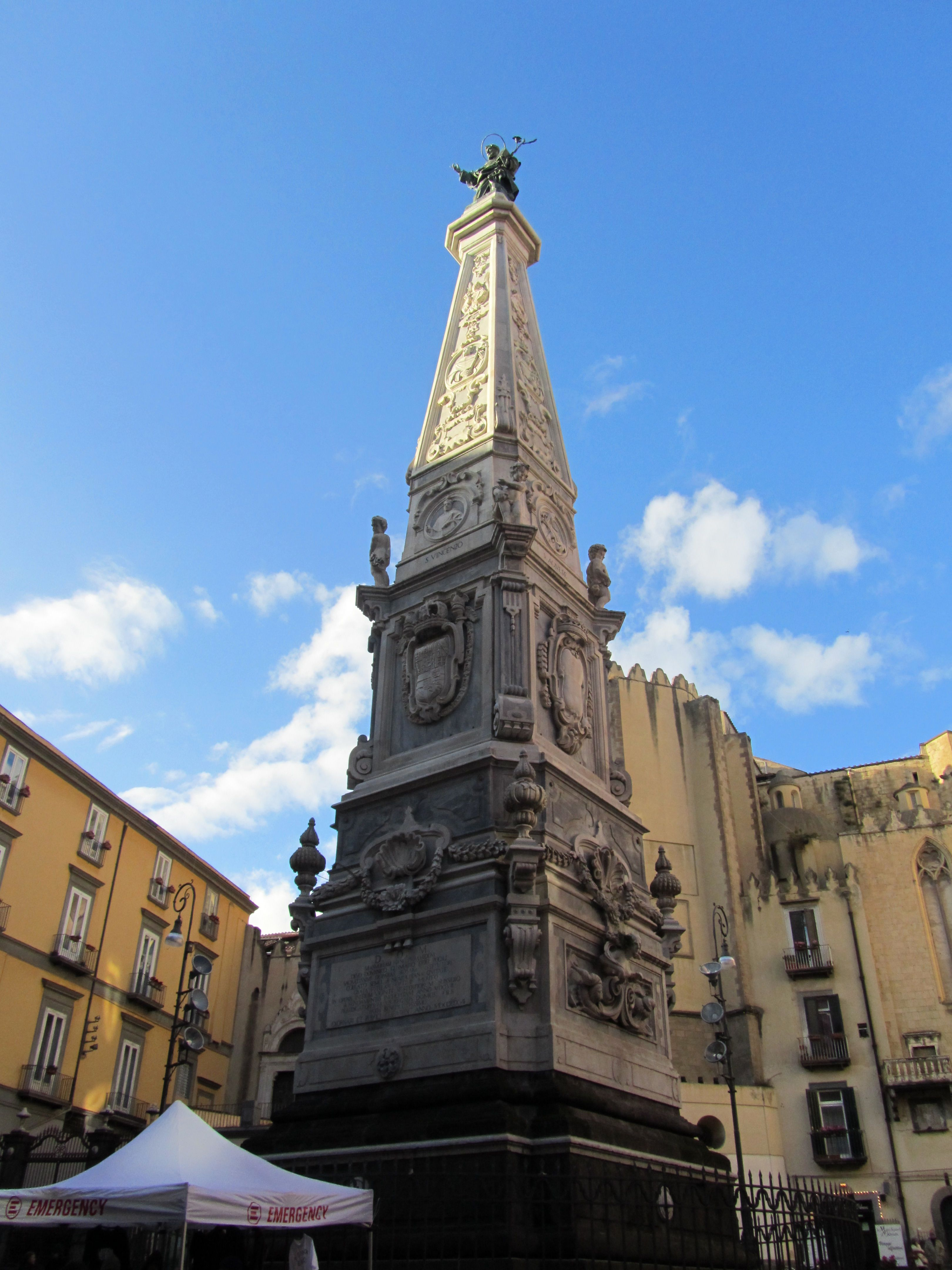
San Domenico by Fanzago

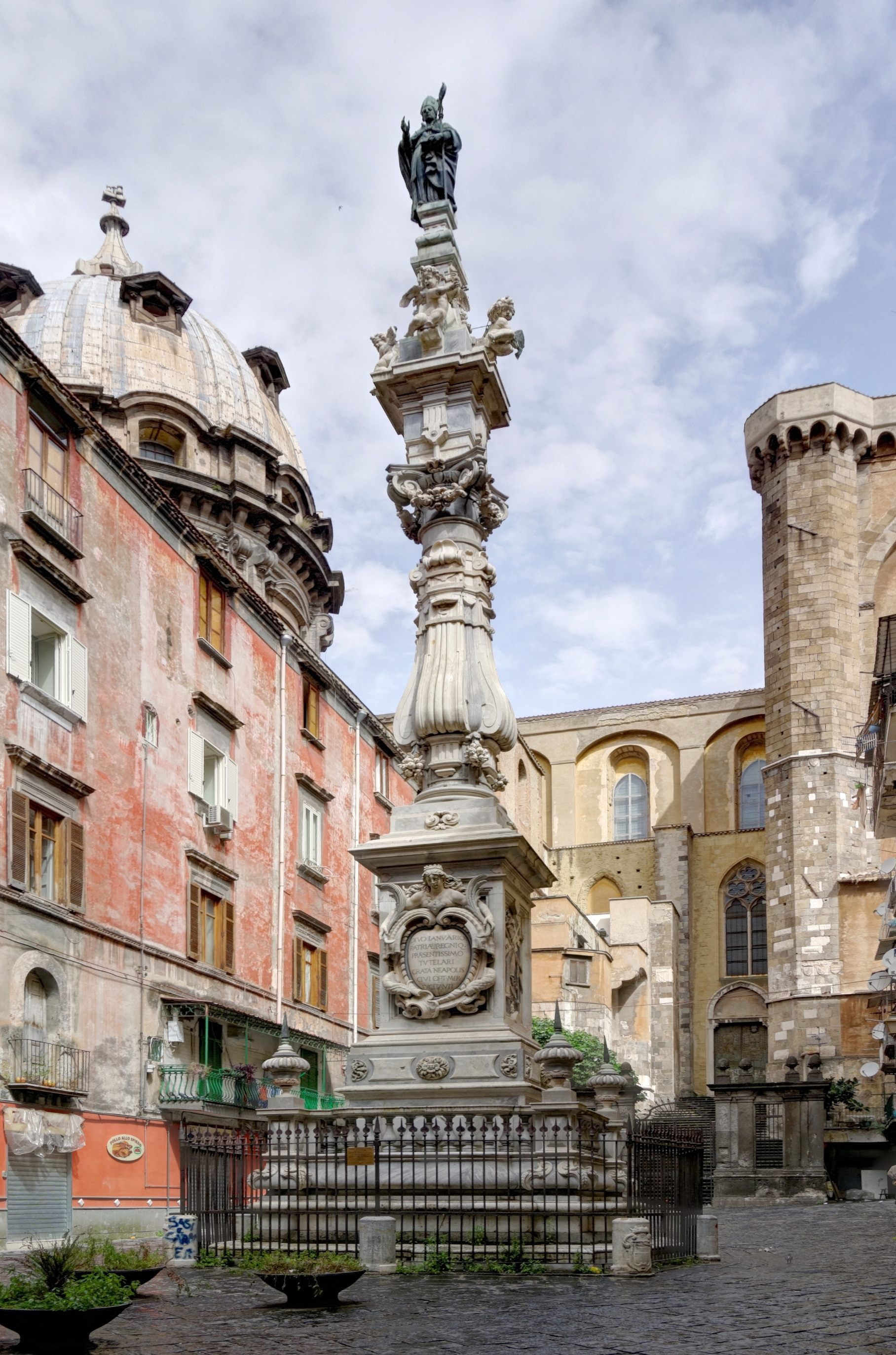
San Gennaro by Fanzago

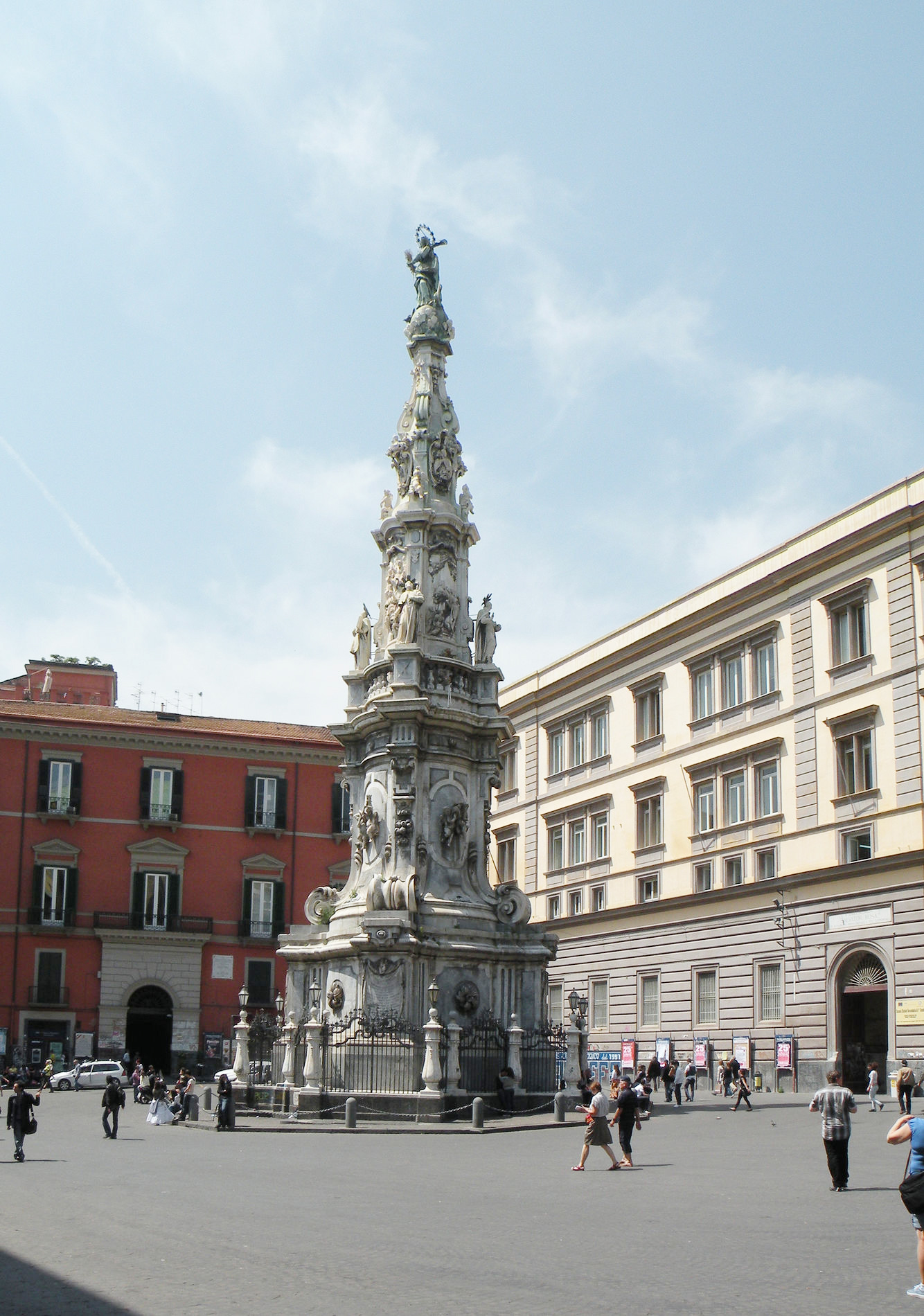
Immacolata by Bottiglieri and Pagano

- Spire of San Gennaro (begun 1636, completed 1650) in the square dedicated to Cardinal Sisto Riario Sforza. It is the work of Cosimo Fanzago, perhaps the greatest architect of the Neapolitan Baroque. The spire was erected to celebrate the deliverance of the city from the great earthquake of 1631.
- Spire of San Domenico (begun 1656, completed 1737) located in the square of San Domenico Maggiore. The name refers to St Domenico di Guzman, founder of the Dominican Order. The spire was started after the plague of 1656; the designer was again Fanzago. The work was undertaken by the royal architect, Francesco Antonio Picchiati, whose concern for documenting and preserving the ruins of the ancient Roman city of Neapolis beneath the site caused the construction to be suspended in 1680. By then, the spire had reached only about half its present height. Only in 1737, was the guglia completed by the architect Domenico Antonio Vaccaro, under the patronage of Charles III, the first Bourbon monarch of Naples. By definition, this spire is the only true "plague column" of the three.
- Spire of the Immaculate Virgin (begun 1747, completed 1750) located in the center of the Piazza of Gesù Nuovo. It was erected under Charles III. He had commented that the people should have means of admiring the statue of the Immaculate Virgin without having to go into the church of Gesù Nuovo, where the statue stood. The Jesuit Francesco Pepe refused royal patronage and financed the construction of the spire through public donations. The spire was designed by Giuseppe Genoino and the main sculptors were Matteo Bottiglieri and Francesco Pagano. The rich ornamentation of the spire epitomizes Neapolitan Baroque sculpture. The construction was facilitated by the existence of a pre-existing monument on the site, an equestrian statue of Philip V of Spain, which was partially destroyed in 1707 when the rule of the Spanish viceroys came to an end.

== Other spires ==
- Spire of San Gaetano
- Spire of Portosalvo
- Spires of Giuseppe Vittorio
- Spire of Villa Comunale
- Spire of Materdei
- Spires of Mercato's square
- Spire of Scipione Amirato
- Spire of Salvator Rosa
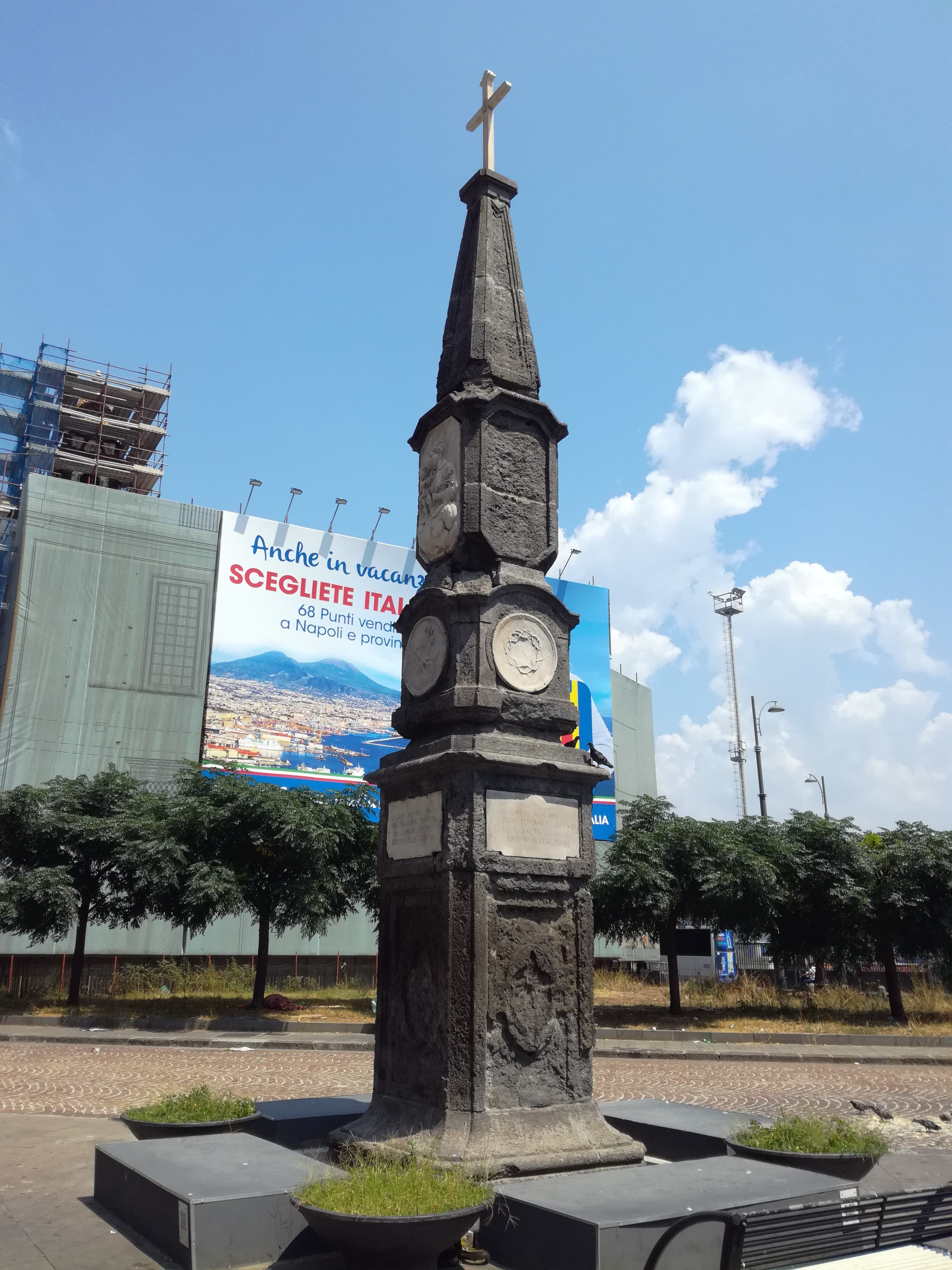
Spire of Portosalvo.

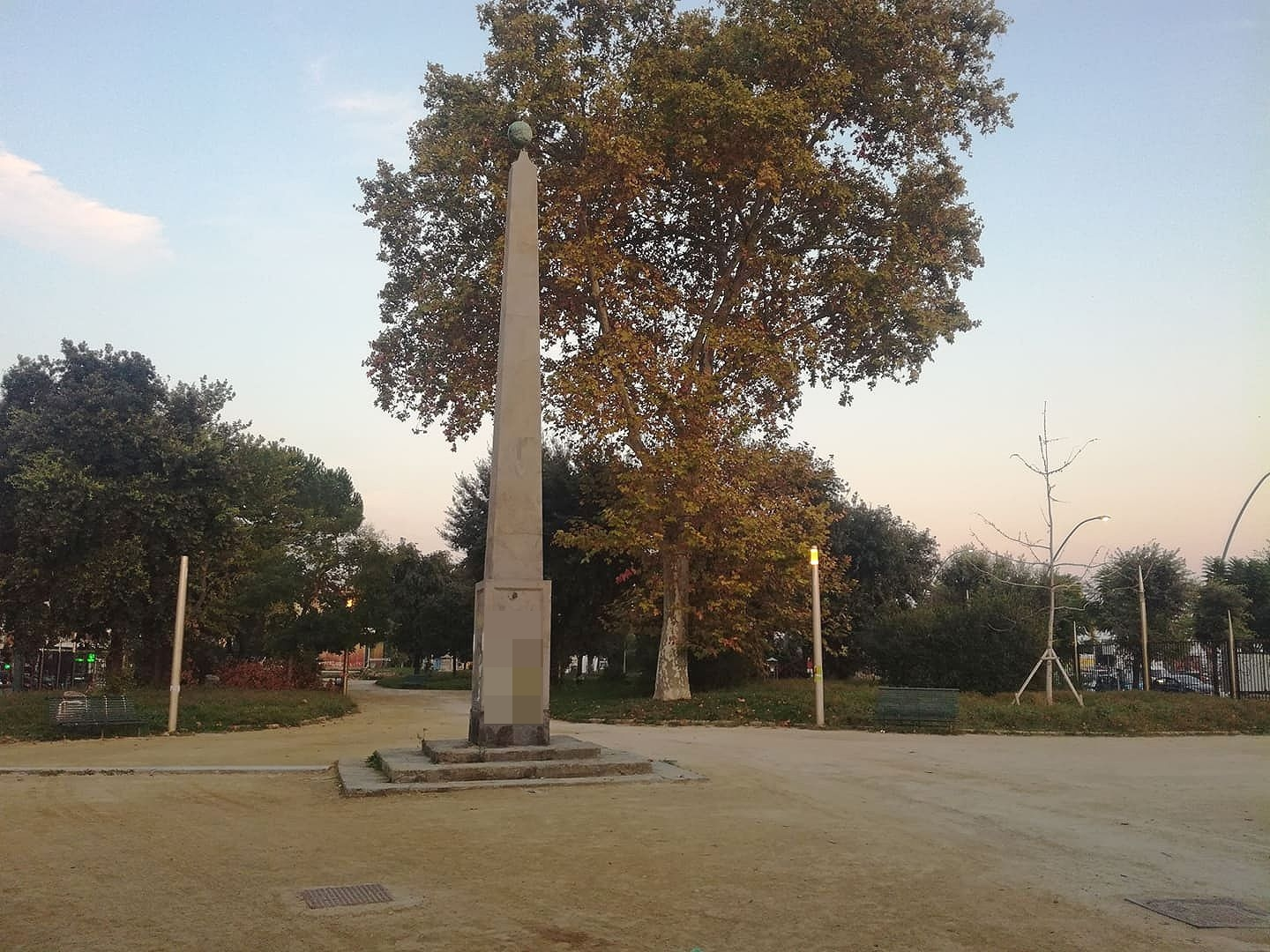
Spire of Villa Comunale.

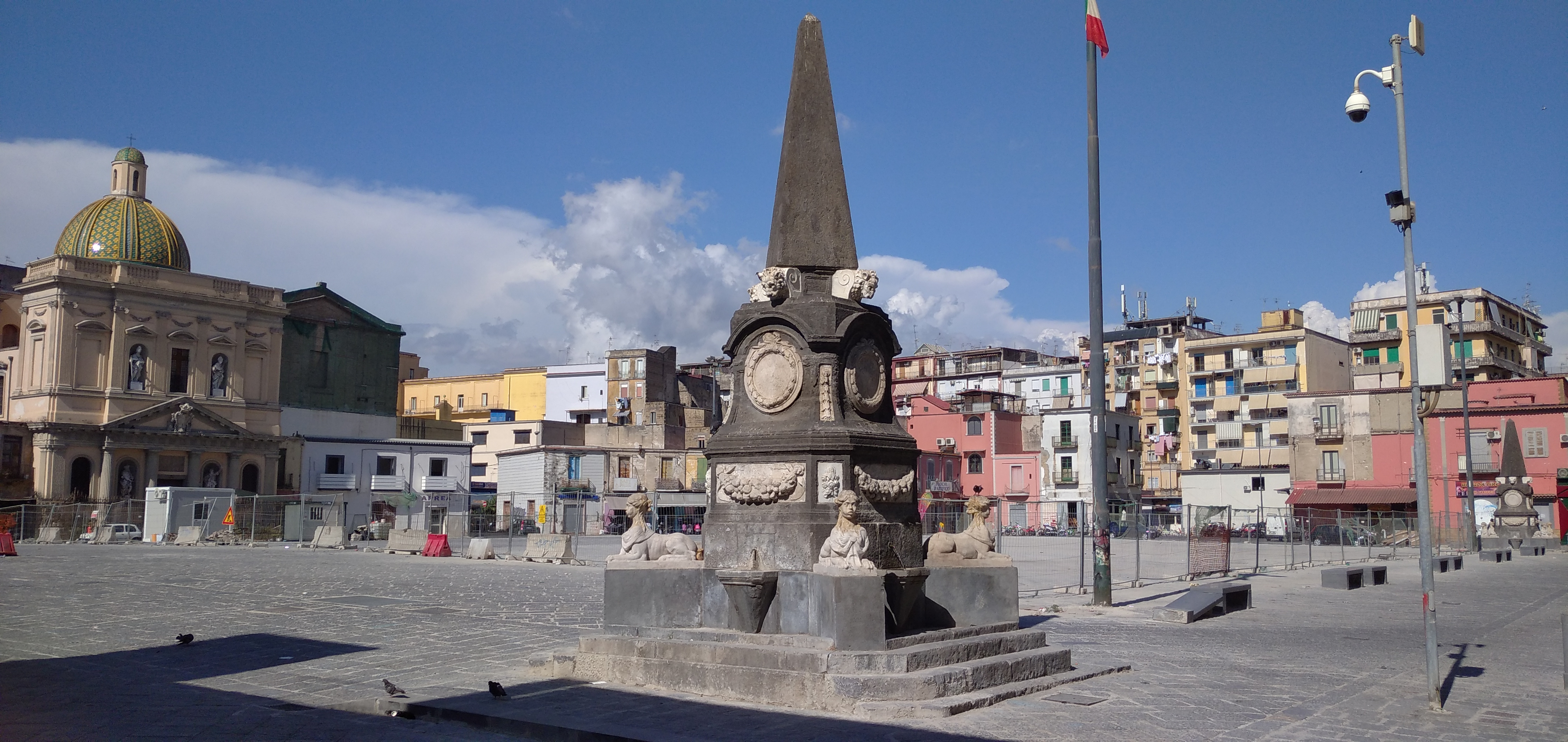
Spires of Mercato's square.

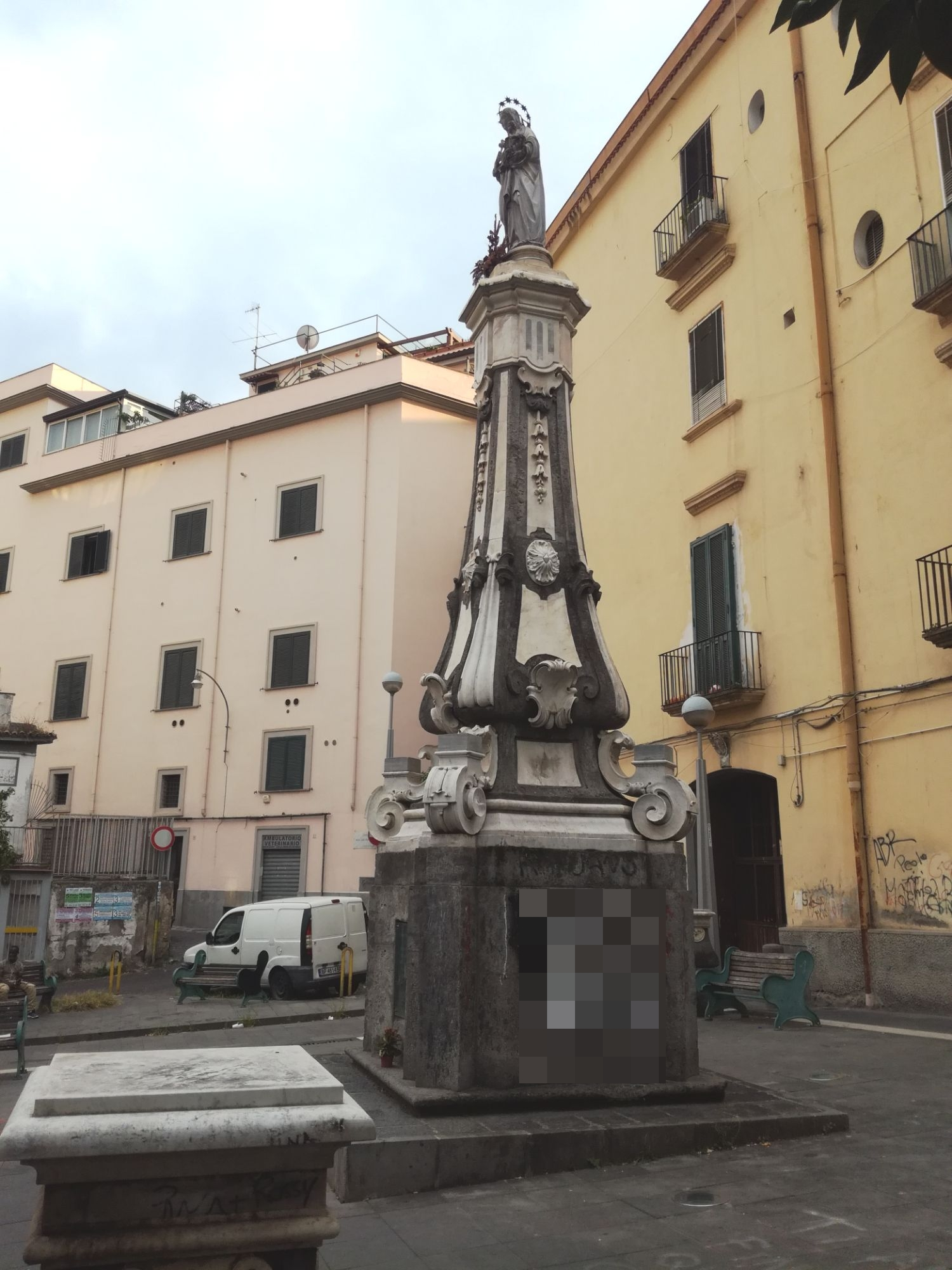
Spire of Materdei.

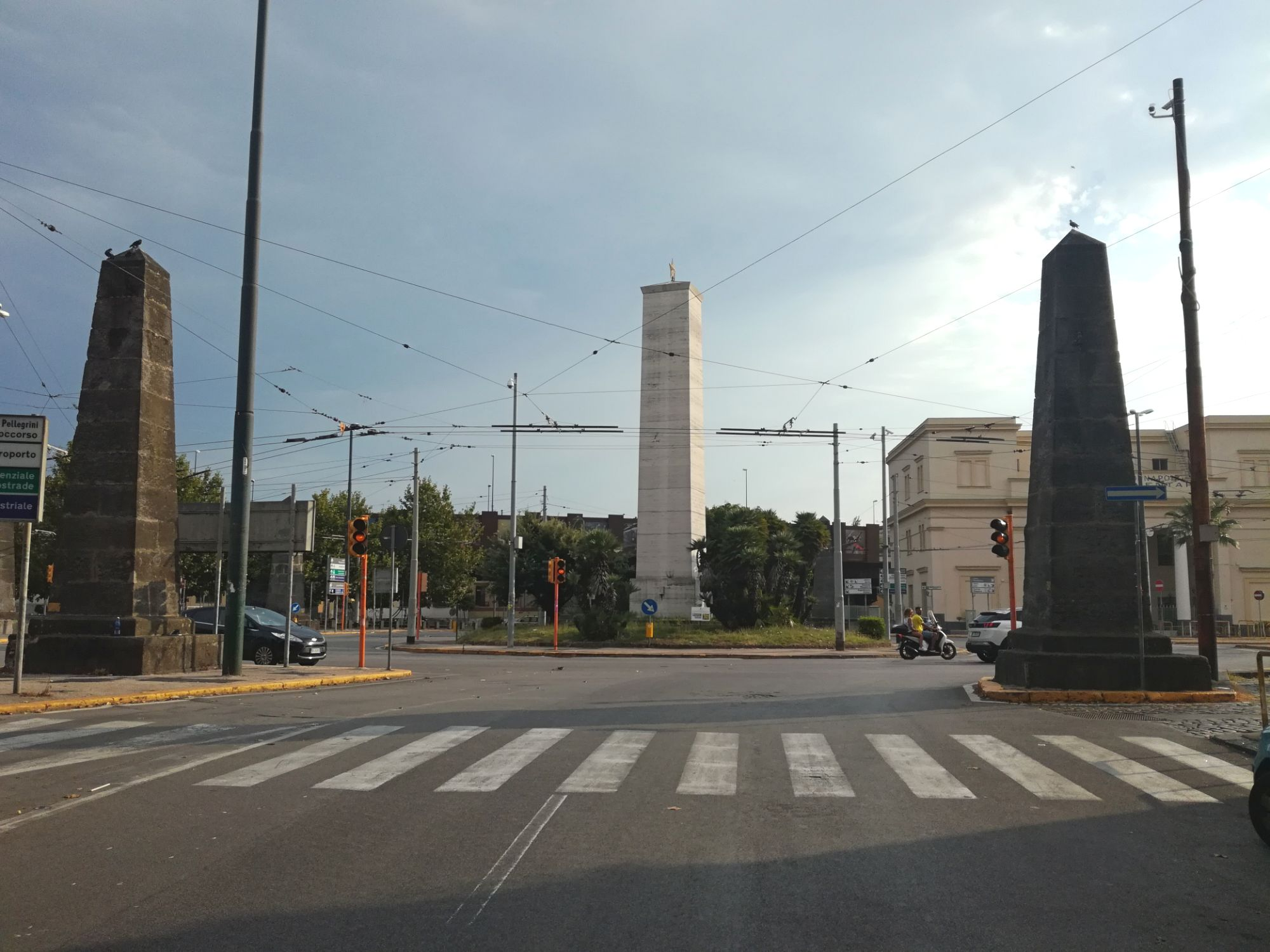
Three of the nine Giuseppe Vittorio's spires.

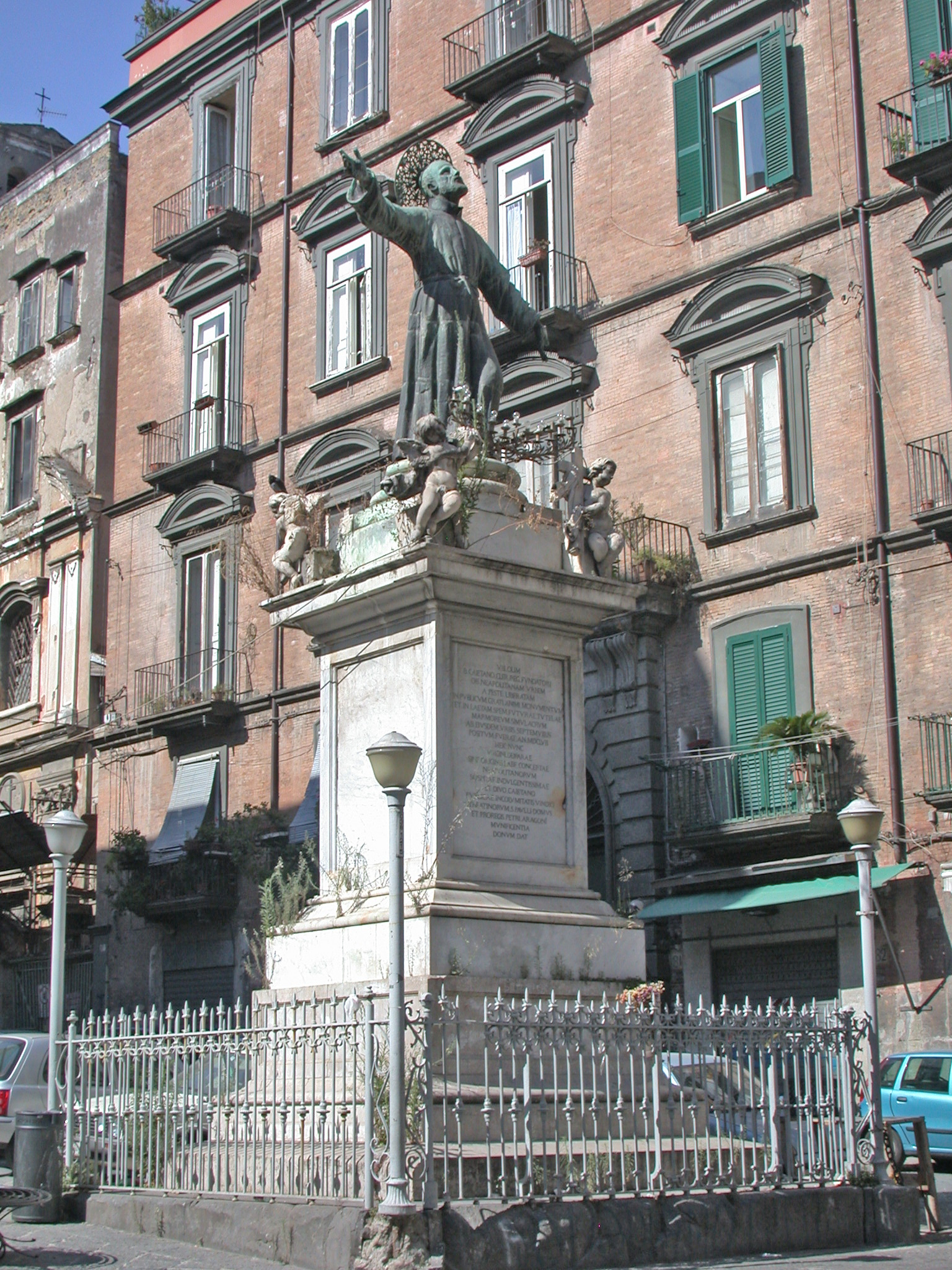
Spire of San Gaetano.

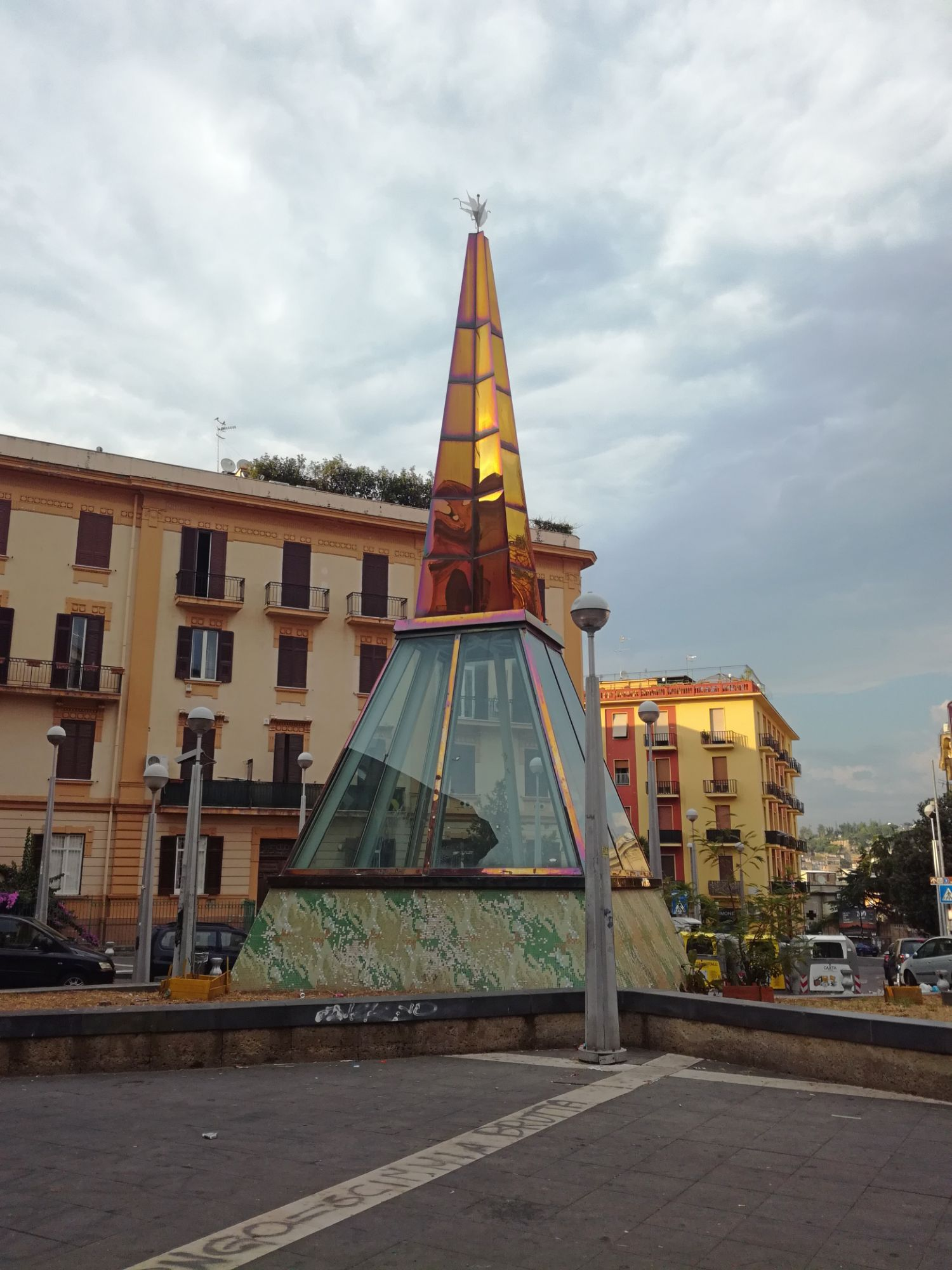
A modern spire: Scipione Ammirato.
