= Gaetano Thiene =

Italian cardiovascular pathology scientist (born 1947)

- Born: 1 July 1947 (age 78); Longare, Vicenza Italy
- Education: University of Padua
- Scientific career
- Fields: Cardiovascular Pathology; Cardiology; Cardiac Surgery; Genetic; Sudden Death; Cardiomyopathies
- Institutions: Emeritus Professor of Cardiovascular Pathology, University of Padua, Italy

Gaetano Thiene (born July 1, 1947) is an Italian Emeritus Professor of Cardiovascular Pathology at the University of Padua. His professional interests include cardiology and pathology.

== Education and career ==
Thiene received a degree in medicine in 1972, and performed specialized post-graduate work in cardiology and pathology from 1975 to 1978. His subsequent professional positions included Professor of Pathology, director of Cardiovascular Sciences and the Institute of Pathological Anatomy, vice-dean of the Department of Medico-Diagnostic Sciences and Special Therapies (all at University of Padua), and in 2002 was an Honorary Fellow of the Royal College of Physicians.

During his career Thiene received research grant support from the European Commission, the Italian Ministry of Health, and the Italian Ministry of Education.

== Awards and honors ==
- 2008 Andreas Grüntzig Lecture and Award, Swiss Society of Cardiology
- 2011 Distinguished Achievement Lecture and Award, Society for Cardiovascular Pathology
- 2013 Paul Dudley White International Lecture and Award, American Heart Association
- 2014 Rene Laennec Lecture and Award, European Society of Cardiology
