= Via Foria =

Street in Naples, Italy

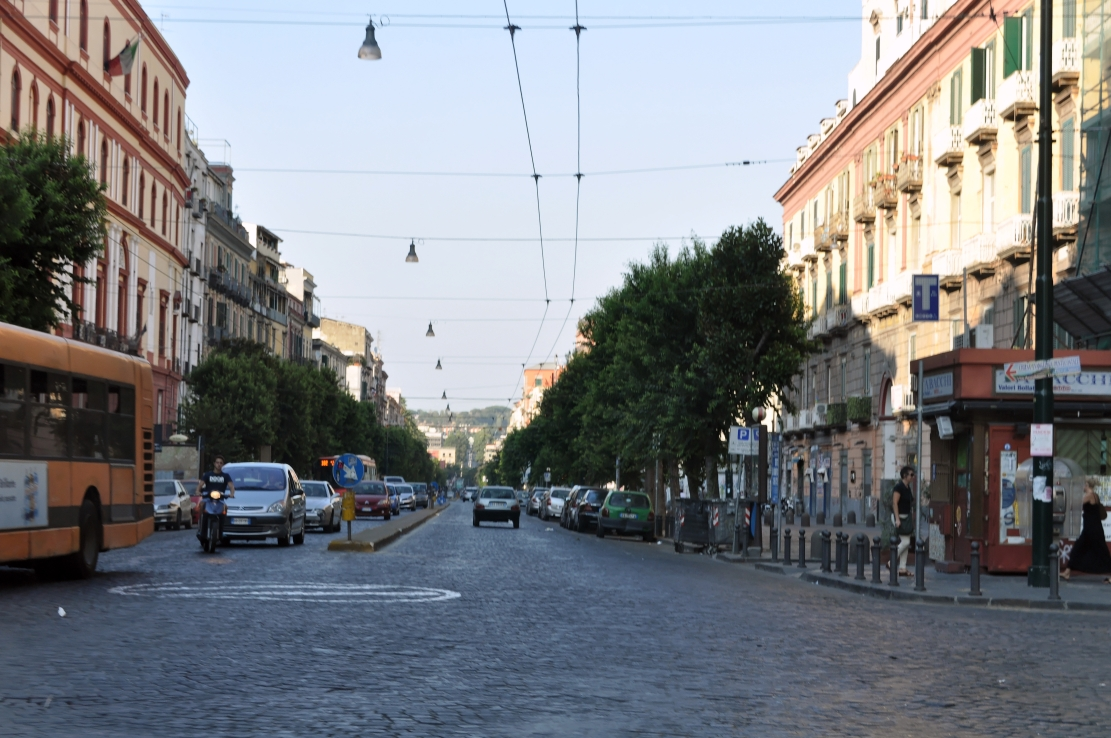
- Interactive map of Via Foria
- Length: 0.6 mi (0.97 km)
- Location: Naples, Italy
- Quarter: San Carlo all'Arena, San Lorenzo, Stella
- Postal code: 80137, 80139
- From: Piazza Cavour
- To: Piazza Carlo III

Via Foria (Italian pronunciation: [foˈria]) is a historic street in Naples that forms the northern boundary of the city's ancient historic centre. It runs from Piazza Cavour down to Piazza Carlo III.

Famous for its numerous distinctive antique shops, the street is exactly one kilometre long, passing through the quarters of San Carlo all'Arena, San Lorenzo, and, to a small extent, Stella.

The name Foria derives from a corruption of Forino (the name by which the street was known from the 18th century onward, having previously been referred to as the strada di San Carlo all'Arena), after the Prince of Forino, who built the palace of the same name, the first in a cluster of buildings in the area.

== History ==
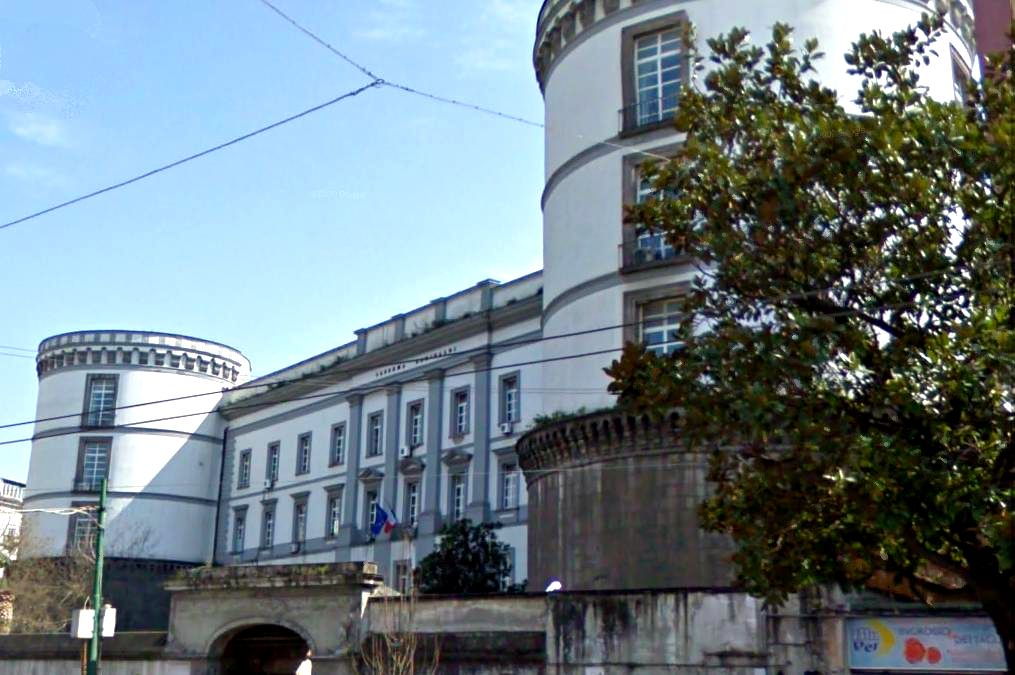
The Caserma Garibaldi

The strada di Forino was originally nothing more than a large lavinaio (a water-collecting channel) that ran close to the northern curtain of the city walls, which, until the Aragonese period, started from the Church of Sant'Agnello Maggiore, skirted Piazza Cavour, and descended towards Castel Capuano along the carbonarius, today's Via Carbonara.

This ditch collected all the torrential waters (known as lava) flowing down from the hills above, such as Stella, Moiariello, Infrascata, and Veterinaria, as well as from the valleys of Sanità and Vergini. The lava dei Vergini in particular was the most feared and the deadliest, on account of the many victims it claimed. The phenomenon of the lava ended in 1871, when rainwater was regulated through a collector system (although some overflows still occurred many years later due to poor maintenance).

In the 16th century, Pedro de Toledo extended the city walls northward; as a result, Porta San Gennaro was relocated and the Porta di Costantinopoli was built in this area.

In the 17th century, several buildings were constructed along the street, including the church of San Carlo all'Arena and the Palazzo Caracciolo di Forino.

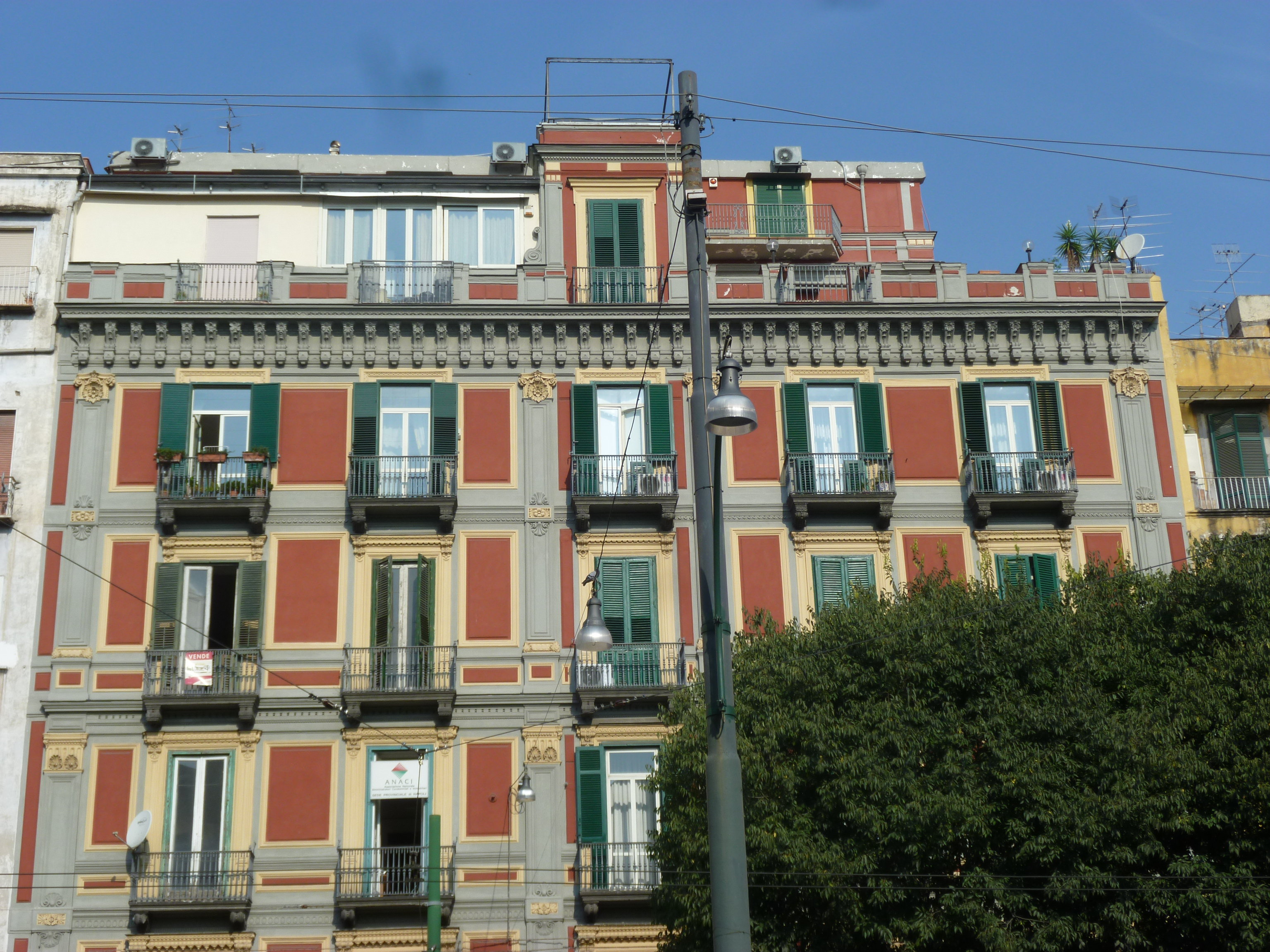
Detail of a palace

The building boom occurred in the 18th century, aided by the paving of the street, carried out precisely between 1767 and 1768: Palazzo Forino had splendid gardens, part of which were expropriated to citizens who began building their own private residences there. Although Palazzo Forino lost part of its splendid gardens, it gained in return a Baroque renovation, which is the one still visible today.

Most of the palaces standing along Via Foria date from this period, as do many of its churches, including the rebuilding of the Church of Sant'Antonio Abate.

Between 1810 and 1812, Joachim Murat arranged for further improvements to the street, as well as for the filling in of the remaining ditches; the straightening works were entrusted to Stefano Gasse and Gaetano Schioppa. From 1811 to 1814, work was carried out to build an extension of the street as far as Poggioreale (the strada nuova del campo), to a design by Giuliano De Fazio, under the supervision of Luigi Malesci.

After the restoration of the Bourbon monarchy, a food market was built between 1846 and 1849 at the corner with Via Duomo, to a design by Francesco De Cesare, on the site of the so-called villa dei pezzenti ("beggars' villa"), a promenade built in the early years of the century that had subsequently fallen into ruin (hence the nickname). Used for the sale of foodstuffs for about fifty years, in the 20th century it became a flower market until 1958, when it was demolished to make way for an enormous tower building, built by the property developer Mario Ottieri, which disrupted the uniform height of the pre-existing buildings.

Again to a design by De Cesare, assisted by Giuseppe Settembre, the strada della Pietatella (today Via Domenico Cirillo) was opened as a link to Via Carbonara, with work carried out from 1845 to 1856.

== Monuments, historic buildings and places of interest ==
- Palace Via Foria 68-73
- Palazzo Montemajor
- Church Santa Maria delle Grazie a Piazza Cavour
- Porta San Gennaro
- Palazzo dello Schiantarelli
- Church San Carlo all'Arena
- Palazzo Manzi
- Palazzo De Luteziis
- Caserma Garibaldi
- Palazzo Celenza
- Palazzo Ruffo di Castelcicala
- Palazzo Recupito Ascolese
- Palazzo Capuano
- Palazzo Vastarella
- Palazzo Zezza
- Palazzo De Franchis
- Church of Santa Maria Addolorata dei Franchis
- Palazzo Pitocchi
- Palazzo Miccione
- Palace at no. 222 Via Foria
- Palace at no. 228 Via Foria
- Palazzo Lariano Sanfelice
- Palazzo via Foria 242
- Botanical Garden of Naples
- Church Sant'Antonio Abate
- Real Albergo dei Poveri

== Bibliography ==
- AA.VV., Napoli nobilissima, vol. IX, fasc. VII, Berisio Editore.
- Rocco Civitelli, Via Foria. Un itinerario napoletano, Dante & Descartes, 2006.
- Cesare De Seta, Napoli tra Barocco e Neoclassicismo, Electa Napoli, 2002.
- Romualdo Marrone, Le strade di Napoli, Newton Compton, 2004.
