= Via Cesare Rosaroll =

Street in Naples, Italy

- Namesake: Cesare Rosaroll
- Length: 800 m (2,600 ft)
- Location: Naples, Italy
- Quarter: San Lorenzo (4th municipality)
- Postal code: 80139
- From: Via Foria
- Major junctions: Salita Pontenuovo, Vico Santa Caterina a Formiello, Via Titina de Filippo, Via Casanova
- To: Piazza Principe Umberto and Corso Giuseppe Garibaldi

Construction
- Completion: second half of the 19th century

Via Cesare Rosaroll (Neapolitan pronunciation: [t͡ʃɛsə rosːarɔlə]) is a historic street in Naples, Italy, in the San Lorenzo quarter. It descends from Via Foria, at the level of the Garibaldi Barracks, passing through the open square that contains Porta Capuana and the former Palazzo della Pretura (between Via Casanova and Piazza San Francesco a Capuana), until it joins Corso Garibaldi and Piazza Principe Umberto.

== History ==
Before becoming a street, the route was a deep ravine, the bed of a stream that flowed down from the Vergini area and continued as far as Carmine. Along this ravine ran, in the second half of the 15th century, the Aragonese city walls, of which two towers survive today: Torre Sant'Anna, in the lower section near Porta Capuana, and Torre San Michele, at the top of Salita Pontenuovo. A third tower, known as Torre Duchesca, survives incorporated into the buildings of Vico Santa Caterina a Formiello; a fourth, Torre Sirena, has disappeared.

Near Torre San Michele, a four-arched bridge, continuing on from Salita Pontenuovo, spanned the moat and provided access to Borgo Sant'Antonio Abate, forming an important route out of the city. Period views also document a traditional game, popular among the Aragonese sovereigns, that was played along the stretch of walls between Torre del Salvatore, on Via Foria, and Torre San Michele.

=== The opening of the street ===
The moat was filled in around the middle of the 19th century, giving rise to the layout of present-day Via Rosaroll. The street was named after Cesare Rosaroll, a Neapolitan patriot, as part of the street-naming programme launched after the Unification of Italy to honour figures who had opposed the Bourbon monarchy, often at the expense of previous historic names.

In the 1920s the street was home to a lively gathering place for artists and intellectuals, remembered as Naples's "Latin Quarter".

The two surviving Aragonese towers are today in a state of neglect. Carved into the piperno blocks that make up Torre San Michele are symbols that some scholars believe can be traced back to the marks of the quarrymen's teams from the Soccavo quarries, similar to those observable at the Church of Gesù Nuovo.

== Buildings ==
Along the street stand several buildings listed in the national cultural heritage catalogue, most of them built between the 18th and 19th centuries in tuff masonry with piperno flooring, arranged around central courtyards and served by double-flight staircases:

- The building at no. 77 dates from 1732 and has three stairwells, two lateral and one central, as well as three exposed façades onto Via Rosaroll, Vico Santa Caterina and Vico Cappella.
- The buildings at nos. 85 and 171 date from the mid-19th century, the former with an imposing stairwell with segmental arches overlooking the courtyard.
- The building at no. 161, from 1856, has an arcaded courtyard and an internal staircase with steps in bardiglio marble.
- The building at no. 151, from the 1860s, has an arcaded courtyard with moulded oval windows.
- The building at no. 95, built between 1875 and 1888, has a trapezoidal plan and a staircase of mixed construction, partly rebuilt in reinforced concrete.
- The building at no. 141, from 1899, has an entrance hall with richly decorated cross vaults and rises over six storeys.
- The building at no. 74, from the first half of the 20th century, has a trapezoidal plan and a mixed structure of masonry and reinforced concrete.

== Monuments ==
At the intersection of Piazza Principe Umberto and Via Cesare Rosaroll stands a monumental marble plaque from 1923, dedicated to the fallen of the World War I from the Vicaria section. The work, cast by the Chiurazzi foundry from a model by the sculptor Gino De Micheli, depicts in bronze the Italia turrita and a tripod decorated with ram's-head motifs.

== Bibliography ==
- Francesco Iuliano; Margherita Maurea, eds. (2023). Progettare nella città antica. Naples: Federico II University Press. ISBN 978-88-6887-192-5.

== See also ==
- Porta Capuana
