= Corso Giuseppe Garibaldi =

Street in Naples, Italy

- Interactive map of Corso Giuseppe Garibaldi
- Former name: Strada dei fossi
- Length: 1,760 m (5,770 ft)
- Postal code: 80139-80141-80142
- Nearest metro station: Napoli Porta Nolana
- From: Via Nuova Marina
- To: Piazza Carlo III

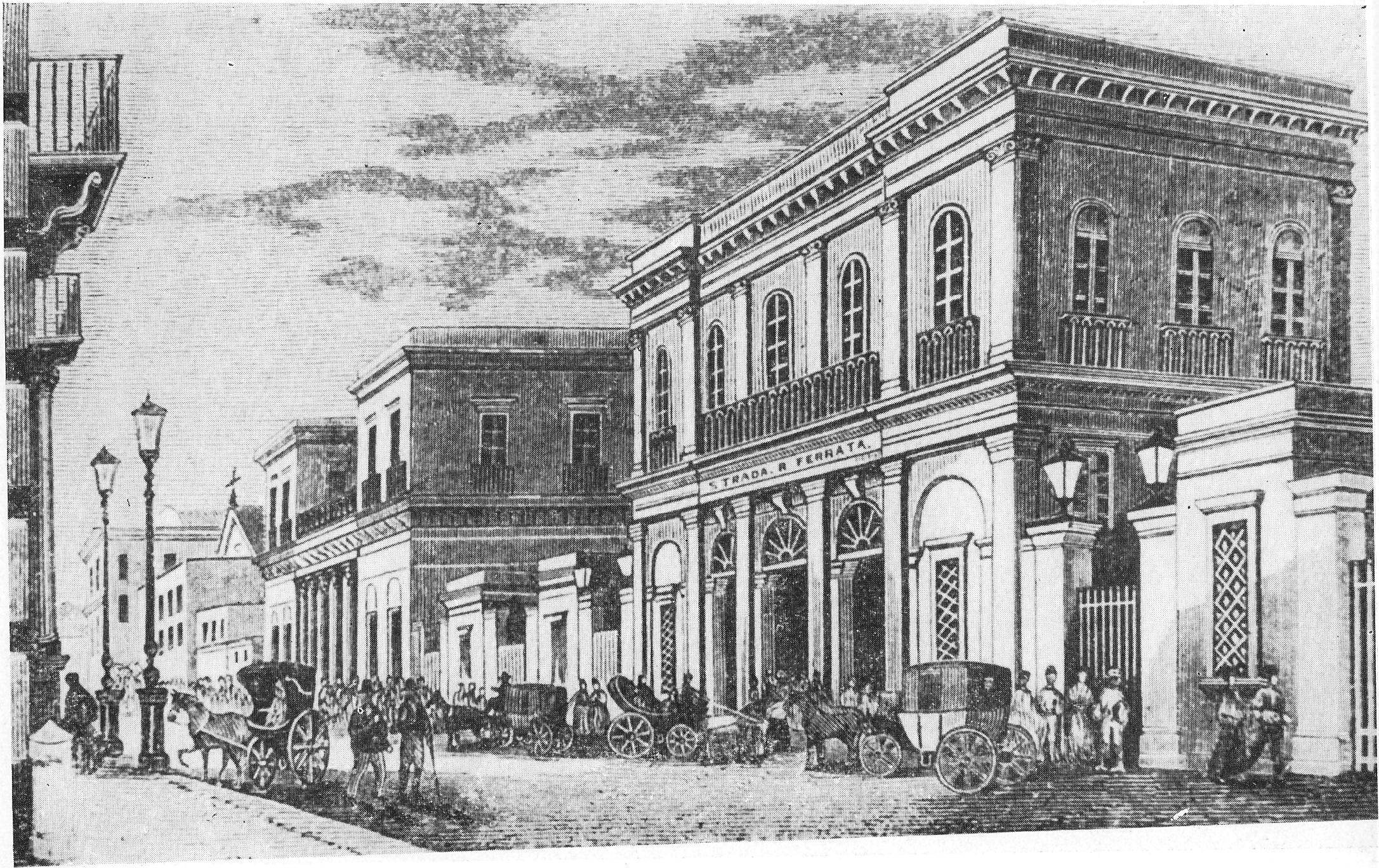
Corso Garibaldi in the nineteenth century, at the time of the opening of the Naples (Bayard) railway station

Corso Giuseppe Garibaldi is an important street in Naples connecting Piazza Carlo III and via Nuova Marina.

== History ==
Ferdinand II of Bourbon recognized the potential of the eastern part of the city and in 1840 entrusted Luigi Giura with the task of filling in the old moat along the eastern city walls and laying a street over it, the strada dei fossi ("street of the moats").

The king had the terminus of the Naples–Portici railway, in operation from 1839, built along the street, followed from 1843 by the terminus of the railway line to Caserta.

The original route closely followed the line of the city walls: on reaching the Duchesca area, the street turned northwest and came out near via Foria, along what is today called via Cesare Rosaroll. The stretch as far as piazza Carlo III was built at the end of the nineteenth century, as part of the Risanamento works.

Until 1906 there remained a bend in the stretch between piazza Guglielmo Pepe and via Marina, caused by the projecting spur of the Castello del Carmine. That year the castle was demolished, and the street was made into a single straight line from its northern end.

The street was named after Garibaldi because he arrived in Naples on the train of the Naples–Portici railway. What is now called piazza Guglielmo Pepe was also dedicated to him, under that name since 1891.

== Description ==
From the street one can reach Borgo Sant'Antonio Abate and Porta Nolana, where a well-known neighbourhood market takes place. Along the street stand historic neoclassical, Neo-Renaissance, and Liberty-style buildings, together with shops of various kinds. At its two ends lie two of Naples's key squares: piazza Carlo III, home to the Real Albergo dei Poveri and the Botanical Garden, and piazza Guglielmo Pepe, where the Porta del Carmine stood until 1862, not far from Napoli Porta Nolana railway station, the terminus of the Circumvesuviana and the former terminus of the Bourbon railway to Caserta. Corso Garibaldi also runs through Piazza Garibaldi, where Napoli Centrale railway station is located.

Halfway along the street lies piazza Nolana, named after the Aragonese-era Porta Nolana gate that overlooks it. At the other end of the square stands the Church of Santi Cosma e Damiano a Porta Nolana, built in the same period as the buildings lining the corso. The square is also overlooked by the Palazzo dei Telefoni, designed by the young Camillo Guerra.

Between the Porta Nolana station and the ruins of the old Naples–Portici station stands a stele commemorating the arrival in the city, by train, of the Hero of Two Worlds.

== Bibliography ==
- Alisio, Giancarlo (1980). Napoli e il Risanamento. Recupero di una struttura urbana. Napoli: Edizioni Scientifiche Italiane.
- Buccaro, Alfredo; Matacena, Gennaro (2004). Architettura e urbanistica dell’età borbonica. Le opere dello Stato, i luoghi dell’industria. Napoli: Electa Napoli.
- Ferraro, Italo. Napoli. Atlante della città storica. Napoli: Oikos.
- Parisi, Roberto (2003). Luigi Giura 1795-1864. Ingegnere e architetto dell’Ottocento. Napoli: Electa Napoli.
- Rossi, Pasquale (1994). "La chiesa dei Santi Cosma e Damiano lungo la "via dei fossi" in Napoli". Campania Sacra. 25: 415–428.
