= Via Casanova =

Street in Naples, Italy

- Interactive map of Via Casanova
- Location: Naples, Italy
- Quarter: San Lorenzo (4th municipality)
- Postal code: 80139, 80143
- From: Piazza San Francesco a Capuana
- Major junctions: Via Cesare Rosaroll, Piazza Giovanni Leone
- To: Via Arenaccia, Corso Novara

Construction
- Completion: 1840

Via Casanova is a street in Naples, Italy, in the San Lorenzo quarter, in the Arenaccia area. It begins at the small square of San Francesco a Capuana, at the junction with Via Cesare Rosaroll, runs alongside Piazza Giovanni Leone and ends at the junction with Via Arenaccia and Corso Novara.

== Toponymy ==
The name derives from the so-called case nuove ("new houses"), the buildings erected in the area during the works of the Risanamento of Naples in the late 19th century, and has no connection with Giacomo Casanova.

== History ==
=== The Sebeto and the Arenaccia area ===
The street crosses what was once the area of the Arenaccia, a broad sandy expanse in the eastern part of the city towards Poggioreale and the Doganella, where tournaments and jousts were held in the 16th century. The rainwater flowing down from Camaldoli, Vomero, Capodimonte and Capodichino, known locally as lave (mudflows), periodically turned the area into a marsh. Historical sources on the course of the Sebeto river agree that its waters passed through this very area before flowing into the harbour, near the Castello del Carmine.

=== The Murattian project and the bridge ===
In 1812, under the reign of Joachim Murat, a project was launched to connect Via Foria with the Campo di Marte of Capodichino — today the airport area — for use in military exercises; the project included a bridge to cross the watercourse. Work did not begin until 1840, and the bridge, known as the Ponte di Casanova, was inaugurated under Ferdinand II of the Two Sicilies. During the same period, plans were also drawn up — and later partly carried out — for the redevelopment of the then-outlying eastern districts of the city, between present-day Corso Garibaldi and Corso San Giovanni a Teduccio, intended for a new working-class residential quarter in anticipation of the expansion of the port and the establishment of steel industries near the first railway stations: those plans already included the route of the future Corso Garibaldi.

=== From the Risanamento to the "case nuove" ===
The political events of 1859–1860 and the end of the Kingdom of the Two Sicilies interrupted the implementation of these plans. After the Unification of Italy, the plan remained stalled for over thirty years, until the cholera epidemic of 1884 forced the approval of the law for the Risanamento of Naples. The intervention involved the demolition of entire working-class quarters of the historic centre and the relocation of thousands of residents, some of whom were moved into the new residential buildings erected in this area — the case nuove that gave their name to both the street and the bridge. With the raising of the street level, the bridge lost its original function, becoming merely an urban place name, as had already happened to the nearby Ponte della Maddalena; today no visible trace of it remains.

Today, Via Casanova is known chiefly as the site of a wholesale and retail clothing market, which characterises its commercial activity.
