= Corso Amedeo di Savoia =

Street in Naples, Italy

- 'A via nova
- Interactive map of Corso Amedeo di Savoia
- Former names: Corso Napoleone, Strada Nuova di Capodimonte
- Namesake: Amedeo di Savoia, Duke of Aosta
- Location: Naples, Italy
- Quarter: Stella (3rd municipality)
- Postal code: 80136
- From: Ponte della Sanità (after Via Santa Teresa degli Scalzi)
- Major junctions: Via Cagnazzi
- To: Tondo di Capodimonte

Construction
- Construction start: 1806
- Completed: 1810

STRADA NAPOLEONE! Al luogo informe
Chi cangiò d'improvviso il fosco aspetto?
[…] E chi d'un tratto la converse in calle
Sicuro, e fido?

— N. Manzone

Corso Amedeo di Savoia is a street in Naples, Italy, in the Stella quarter. It climbs from the Ponte della Sanità to the Tondo di Capodimonte, forming the continuation of Via Santa Teresa degli Scalzi towards the Royal Park of Capodimonte.

== History ==
=== The Corso Napoleone ===
The street was commissioned by Joseph Bonaparte, who began its construction in 1806; the works continued under Joachim Murat, who inaugurated it in 1810. Crossing the Sanità valley by means of a large bridge, the thoroughfare connected the city centre with the hill of Capodimonte, seat of the royal palace and the royal woods, for the first time, and it took the name Corso Napoleone, or Strada Nuova di Capodimonte ("New Road to Capodimonte"); the popular nickname "'a via nova" (the new road) has survived to this day. Originally, the corso and the present-day Via Santa Teresa degli Scalzi, now two separate streets, formed a single axis.

Documents in the Historical Archive of the Banco di Napoli preserve traces of the works: in April 1808 the Kingdom's Department of Roads authorised payment to the architect Gioacchino Avellino for the creation of a relief model of the new street, to be presented to the sovereign together with a list of the works still to be carried out.

=== Naming after Amedeo di Savoia ===
After the Unification of Italy, as part of the revision of street names undertaken to celebrate the House of Savoy, the street was named after Amedeo di Savoia, Duke of Aosta, second son of Victor Emmanuel II and first Duke of Aosta of the eponymous branch.

=== Il Regresso ===
The upper stretch of the corso, from the area of the Bosco to the Tondo, was formerly known as il Regresso ("the return"): here the carriages of the nobles heading to the Capodimonte hunting reserve would stop so that the horses tired by the climb could be changed, before returning downhill.

On the outer side of one of the bends in this stretch, just past the Madre del Buon Consiglio, stands a monumental fountain in piperno stone and brick, donated to the city in 1939 by Princess Hélène of Orléans, wife of Emanuele Filiberto, Duke of Aosta. Having lived for many years at Capodimonte, the duchess was remembered by Neapolitans for her charitable work on behalf of the poor and the city's outlying districts, and she is buried in the very basilica facing the fountain.

The basilica, known among Neapolitans as "the Neapolitan Saint Peter's" for its dome, has an appearance reminiscent of ancient architecture but was in fact only inaugurated in 1960.

The corso ends at the Tondo di Capodimonte, a place name unique in the city, where the entrance opens onto the Giardini della Principessa Iolanda (Princess Iolanda Gardens) and their monumental staircase, which cuts across the Regresso road.

== Points of interest ==
On the left side of the corso, Via Cagnazzi opens off it; before the area was urbanised, it led to an isolated area where the villa of the writer Ferdinando Russo once stood.

The corso is flanked by residential buildings in Neoclassical and Neo-Renaissance style, built between the 19th and 20th centuries for the nobility and upper middle class who chose to live along this new ceremonial axis of the city, featuring monumental portals, rusticated bases, and balconies overlooking the Sanità valley.

Through the complex of the former Ospedale di San Gennaro dei Poveri, founded as a monastery in the 5th century and converted in the 17th century into a hospice and plague hospital during the plague epidemic of 1656, one can reach the Basilica San Gennaro extra Moenia, one of the oldest early Christian places of worship in southern Italy and the first burial site of the city's patron saint after his remains were transferred from Pozzuoli. The same complex also gives access to the Catacombs of San Gennaro.

Also along the corso stands the Church of Santa Maria del Soccorso all'Arenella.
