= Via Nuova Marina =

- Interactive map of Via Nuova Marina
- Former name: Via Marina
- Location: Naples, Italy
- Quarter: Porto, Pendino
- Postal code: 80133
- From: Via Cristoforo Colombo
- To: Corso Giuseppe Garibaldi

Via Nuova Marina, commonly known as Via Marina, is a historic street in Naples, Italy, running along the southern edge of the Porto and Pendino districts.

It is one of the roads forming Naples' waterfront route. The street begins at the junction of Via Cristoforo Colombo and Via Alcide De Gasperi and ends shortly before the intersection with Corso Giuseppe Garibaldi and Via Ponte dei Francesi, where it continues as Via Alessandro Volta.

A major element of Naples' road network, it provides the fastest connection between the Port of Naples, the city centre, the eastern districts of the city and the nearest motorway access points.

== History ==
=== Charles III's road ===
The construction of a coastal road bypassing the dense and labyrinthine lower quarters of Naples was promoted by Charles III of Spain, who recognised the strategic importance of the eastern area of the city, including the Royal Palace of Portici and the future development of the Golden Mile. The road was built between 1740 and 1749.

The works were initially directed by Giovanni Bompiede, Engineer Director of the Maritime Works, assisted by Giovanni Antonio Medrano, and later by Bompiede alone. During construction, the dismantling of portions of the city's defensive walls began, a necessary step for opening the new road.

To commemorate the completion of the project, a shrine designed by Michele Reggio was erected in 1749 and adorned with an inscription written by Alessio Simmaco Mazzocchi. Decorated with the royal coat of arms, it stood at the eastern end of the road near the beginning of the Strada della Marinella, close to the Castel Carmine.

Also designed by Bompiede was the Vado del Carmine, built in 1748 near Piazza Mercato in place of the former Porta della Conceria.

Following the reign of Charles III, urban improvements continued under Ferdinand IV. Important buildings erected in the area included the Bourbon Cavalry Barracks designed by Luigi Vanvitelli near the Ponte della Maddalena, and the Granili complex, constructed between 1779 and 1790 by Ferdinando Fuga beyond the Carmine district.

=== 19th century ===
In 1846, during the construction of the Strada de' Fossi (today's Corso Garibaldi), the commemorative shrine erected in 1749 was demolished. It stood near a bridge crossing the defensive canal known as the Fiumicello. The marble and sculptural elements of the monument were reused in the paving of the San Carlo all'Arena church.

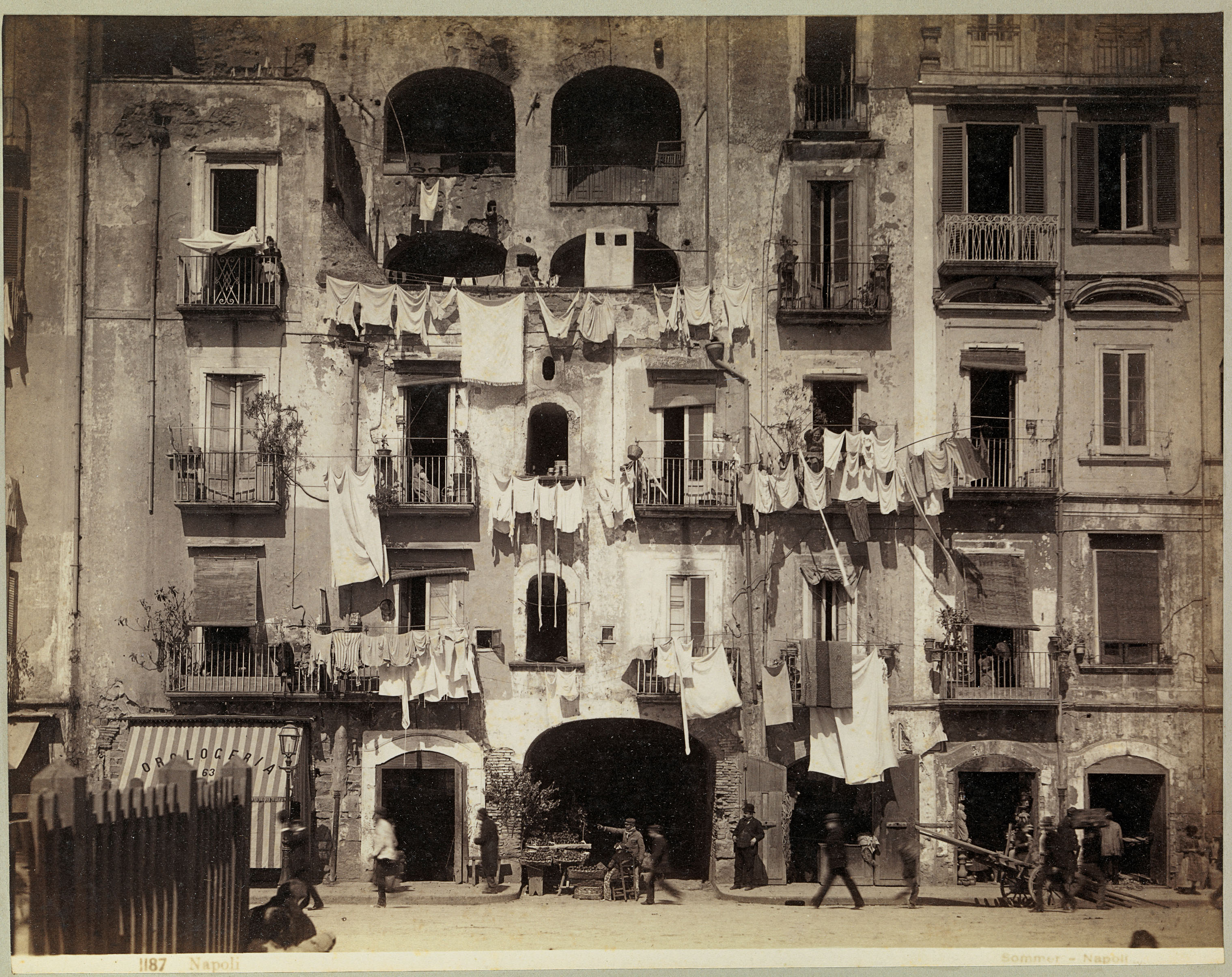
The Porta della Marina del Vino

In 1855, a new fish market building was erected near the Porta della Pietra del Pesce, designed by Luigi Catalani at the request of Ferdinand II of the Two Sicilies. The structure was heavily damaged during the bombing of Naples in the Second World War and was demolished after the war.

The nearby gate functioned as a customs checkpoint for fish products. Its name derived from a medieval legend concerning the poet Virgil, who according to local tradition magically preserved the freshness of the city's fish by engraving the image of a living fish on a stone.

The last surviving sections of the city walls were gradually incorporated into surrounding buildings, including the Bastion of Sant'Andrea degli Scopari adjacent to the fish market.

=== After Italian unification and the Risanamento ===
Following Italian unification, the last gates along the southern city walls disappeared. In 1869, the Porta del Caputo was demolished during the opening of a new street, originally called Via Principessa Margherita and now Via Giuseppe Marotta.

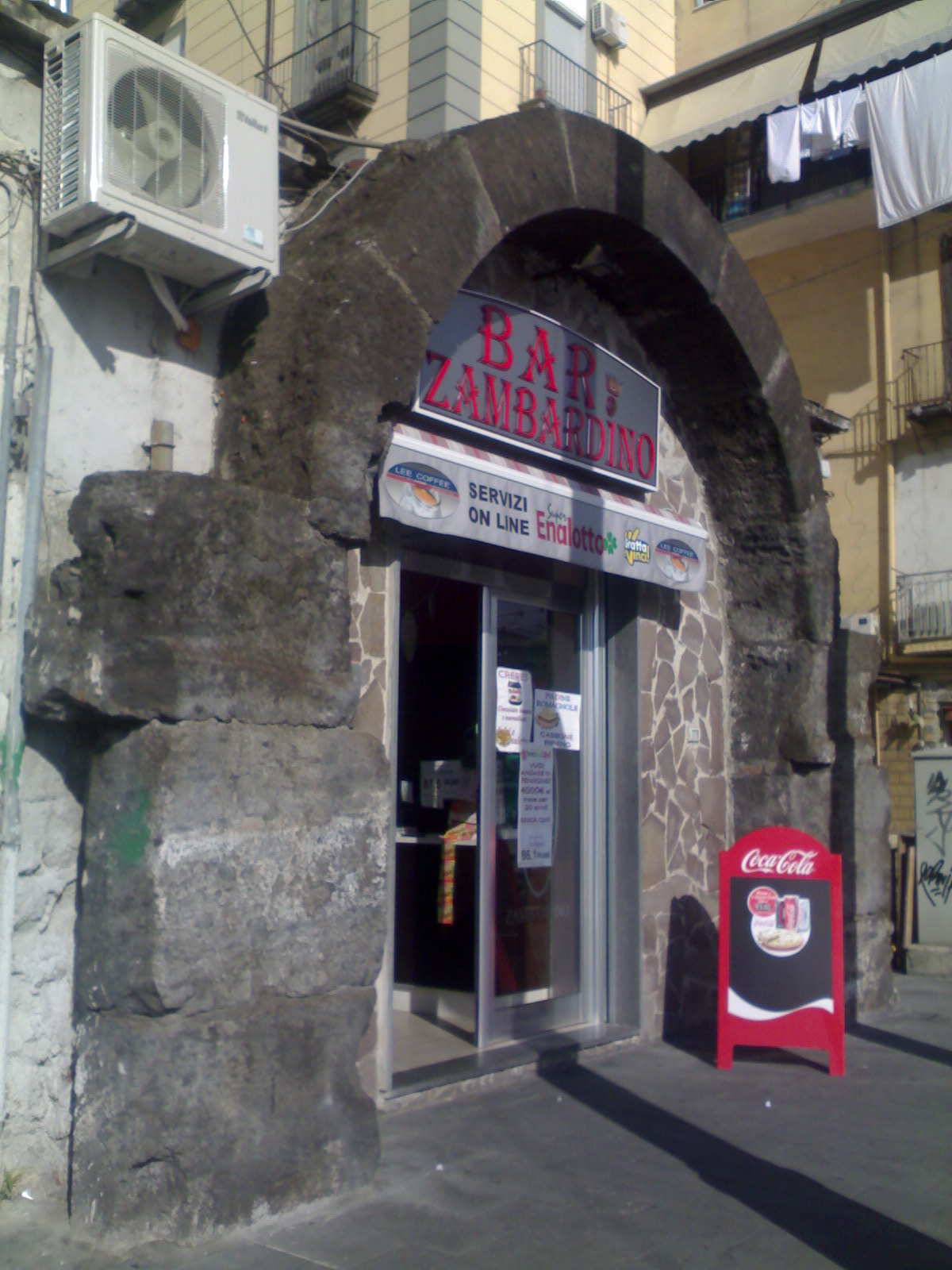
The Porta dei Tornieri

The Porta dei Tornieri was incorporated into a building in 1875 during the extension of Via Duomo. This was followed by the demolition of Porta di Santa Maria Apparente in 1877 and Porta di Massa in 1883.

A positive development was the creation of the Villa del Popolo, a public garden commissioned in 1876 by Mayor Gennaro Sambiase Sanseverino, Duke of San Donato. Completed in 1877, it was intended as a popular counterpart to the Villa Comunale. The garden also housed the Fontana del Gigante. Its decline began with the expansion of port activities and the construction of the port-to-station railway line in 1889, which separated the park from the waterfront.

In 1906, the Castel Carmine was demolished, leaving only part of its southern wall and two Aragonese towers, the Torre Spinella and Torre Brava.

The Risanamento of Naples only moderately affected Via Marina. Unlike other parts of the city, redevelopment was limited. Until the Second World War, the road largely retained its eighteenth-century alignment close to the harbour.

During the Fascist period, Via Marina was temporarily renamed Via Cesario Console. The original name was restored after the fall of the regime.

=== War damage and post-war transformation ===
Allied bombing destroyed much of the historic frontage along Via Marina and provided justification for widening the road after the war to accommodate growing traffic volumes.

Large sections of Borgo Loreto disappeared, as did part of the Bourbon Cavalry Barracks complex. In the post-war period, architect Luigi Cosenza proposed an ambitious redevelopment plan featuring modern functionalist buildings.

However, the project evolved into a controversial period of speculative development. Numerous historic buildings were demolished and replaced by oversized modern structures. The most notable example was Palazzo Ottieri, completed in 1958 and often cited as a symbol of post-war real-estate speculation in Naples.

The issue became widely known through Francesco Rosi's 1963 film Hands over the City, which used Via Marina as one of its principal settings and criticised corruption and speculative construction practices.

Further demolitions continued throughout the 1960s and 1970s, including the destruction of historic churches and residential blocks. By the late twentieth century, almost none of the original waterfront building frontage survived.

== Bibliography ==
- Roberto Pane, Il centro antico di Napoli. Naples: ESI, 1971.
- Giuseppe Pignatelli, Napoli: tra il disfar delle mura e l'innalzamento del muro finanziere. Naples: Alinea Editrice, 2006.
- G. Alisio, Napoli e il Risanamento. Recupero di una struttura urbana. Naples, 1980.
