= Giovanni Carafa =

Giovanni Carafa may refer to:

- Giovanni Pietro Carafa (1476–1559), became Pope Paul IV from May 1555 until his death
- Giovanni Carafa, Duke of Paliano (died 1561), mercenary captain; nephew of Pope Paul IV; executed under Pope Pius IV
- Giovanni Carafa della Spina (1671–1743), Italian soldier and imperial field marshal
- Giovanni Carafa di Noia (1715–1768), producer of the Map of the Duke of Noja
