= Arenaccia =

Coordinates: 40°51′33″N 14°16′6″E

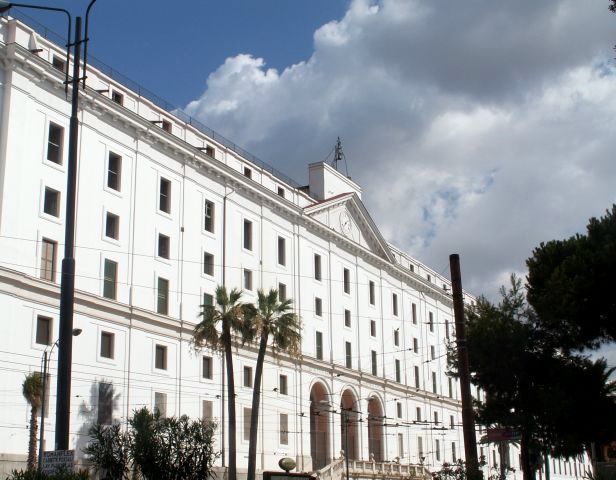
Il Real Albergo dei Poveri on the Piazza Carlo III.

Arenaccia is a historical neighborhood or zona of the Fourth Municipality of northeastern Naples, Italy. Its name derives from the Via Arenaccia road that divides the neighborhoods of San Lorenzo and Vicaria, which covers the area. The east–west boundaries are represented roughly by the Piazza Carlo III and the Corso Malta, while the north-west boundaries are represented from the beginning and end of the Via Arenaccia.

The district was created with the work of reorganization, to expand the city. A Royal Decree of 25 July 1885 approved the expansion in ten districts of the town of Naples (Arenaccia, Sant'Eframo, Vecchio, Ottocalli, Ponti Rossi, Miradois, Materdei, Vomero-Arenella, Belvedere, and Rione Amedeo) and two suburban districts. Frank M. Snowden says of the district, "Arenaccia, Ottocalli and S. Maria delle Paludi instantly became unhygienic modern slums. To live in Arenaccia, however, denoted a position of relative privilege."

Among the notable buildings in the area are the Real Albergo dei Poveri built by Charles III of Spain (which is named after the homonymous square, Piazza Carlo III), the Liceo Classico Giuseppe Garibaldi, and the Teatro San Ferdinando, established around 1790. An artesian well at Arenaccia, near the Ponte della Maddalena, was completed in the year 1888. Stadio Militare dell'Arenaccia was built in 1921–1923.
