= San Carlo all'Arena =

District of Naples, Italy

Coordinates: 40°52′17″N 14°15′34″E

- Quarter of Naples
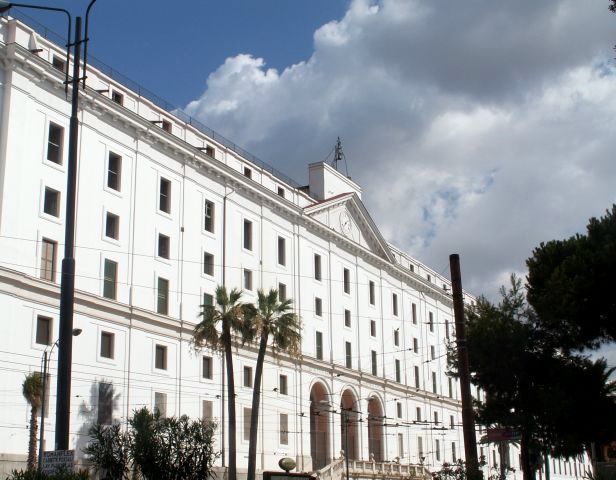
- The restored façade of the Ospedale L'Albergo Reale dei Poveri in Piazza Carlo III.

- Location of San Carlo all'Arena within Naples
- Country: Italy
- Region: Campania
- City: Naples
- Municipalità: 3rd

Area
  - Total: 7.64 km^{2} (2.95 sq mi)

Population
  - Total: 69,094
  - Density: 9,040/km^{2} (23,400/sq mi)
- Postal codes: 80137, 80131 and 80141

San Carlo all'Arena is a district of Naples, the regional capital of Campania, located north-east of the historic centre of the city. This quarter (quartiere) is named after the Church of San Carlo all'Arena and it constitutes - together with district Stella - Naples' third municipality. The district is centered on the Bourbon Hospice for the Poor located in Piazza Carlo III, a square named after Charles III the first Bourbon king of Naples.

== Monuments and Places of Interest ==
=== Church of San Carlo all'Arena ===
San Carlo all'Arena is a Roman Church located in via Foria after which the entire district is named. The name of the church itself derives from the street in which it was originally built, Via Arenosa (sandy street), formed by the debris left in the wake of the rivers coming from the hills.

=== Botanical Garden of Naples ===
The Botanical Garden of Naples is a facility owned by the University of Naples Federico II which houses thousands of plant species. It was founded at the beginning of the 19th century - when the city was under the French domination - with the purposes of "public instruction", "multiplication of beneficial species,[...] agriculture and [...] industry", as established in the founding decree dated 1807 and signed by king Joseph Bonaparte.

=== Bourbon Hospice for the Poor ===
The Bourbon Hospice for the poor is a former public hospital built in the 18th century and designed by the architect Ferdinando Fuga. Its original purpose was to accommodate the poor and sick, however nowadays it is occasionally used to house exhibitions, conferences or concerts.

=== Palace of Capodimonte ===
The Palace of Capodimonte was built as royal residence by the Bourbons and today it houses the National Museum of Capodimonte, in which we can find the works of many great Italian artists, such as Raphael, Tiziano, Masaccio, Simone Martini and Caravaggio. The Palace is located in the Real Bosco, a public park born as hunting reserve, that surrounds the Palace and that overlooks the city and its Gulf.
