= Gennaro Maldarelli =

Italian painter

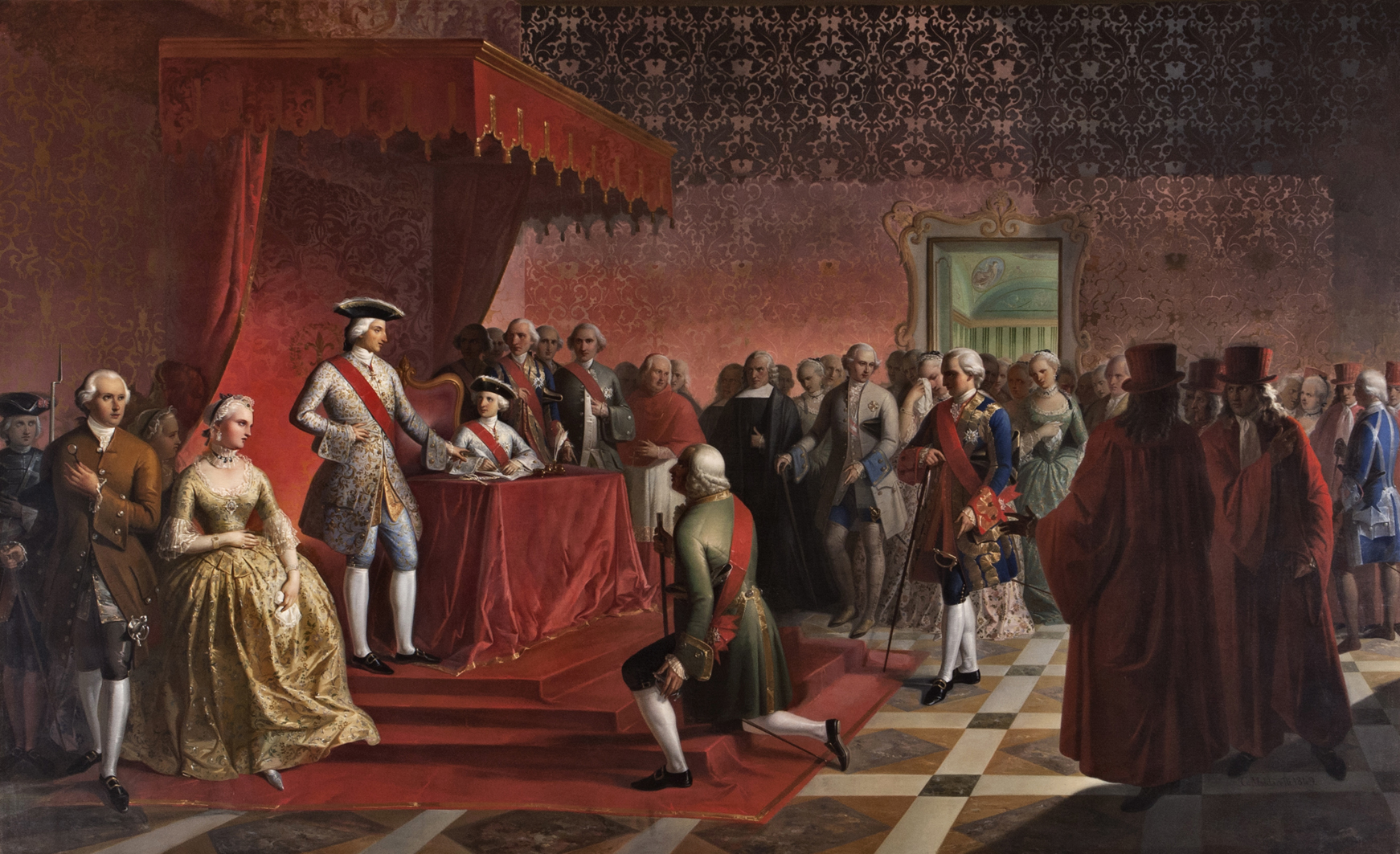
The abdication of Charles of Bourbon from the crowns of Naples and Sicily, in favor of his son Ferdinand

Gennaro Maldarelli (c. 1796 – 20 May 1858) was an Italian painter of the Neoclassic style.

== Biography ==
He was born in Naples. He trained under Costanzo Angelini, and became professor of design at the Royal Institute of Fine Arts in Naples. He often painted decorations in a Pompeian Grottesque style for Neapolitan nobility, including the palaces of Ruffo della Scaletta, Doria d'Angri, Colonna di Stigliano, and San Teodoro. He painted frescoes (1837) for the large oval dome of the church of San Carlo all'Arena. The British diplomat and critic Lord Napier haughtily disdained this work as disfiguring the face of Naples.

Maldarelli was very active for the restored Bourbon monarchy and decorated some rooms of the Royal Palace of Naples and in what is now the Biblioteca Nazionale. In 1845, he helped decorate the ceiling of the throne room of the Reggia di Caserta depicting the Ceremony of the Placement of the First Stone. For the Hall of Alexander, he painted a large canvas depicting Charles of Bourbon Abdicating For His Son Ferdinand.

Among the works that have been lost are a canvas of The Annunciation for the church of Mater Dei; a theater curtain (sipario) for the Teatro San Carlo (1844); some decorations for the Villa Favorita at Ercolano; three canvases depicting the Creation for the Zoological Cabinet at the University of Naples; and the ceiling decorations for the great hall of Royal Meteorologic Observatory at Vesuvius.

Maldarelli died in Naples in 1858.
