= Mercato di Porta Nolana, Naples =

Street Market in Naples, Italy

Coordinates: 40°51′01″N 14°16′06″E

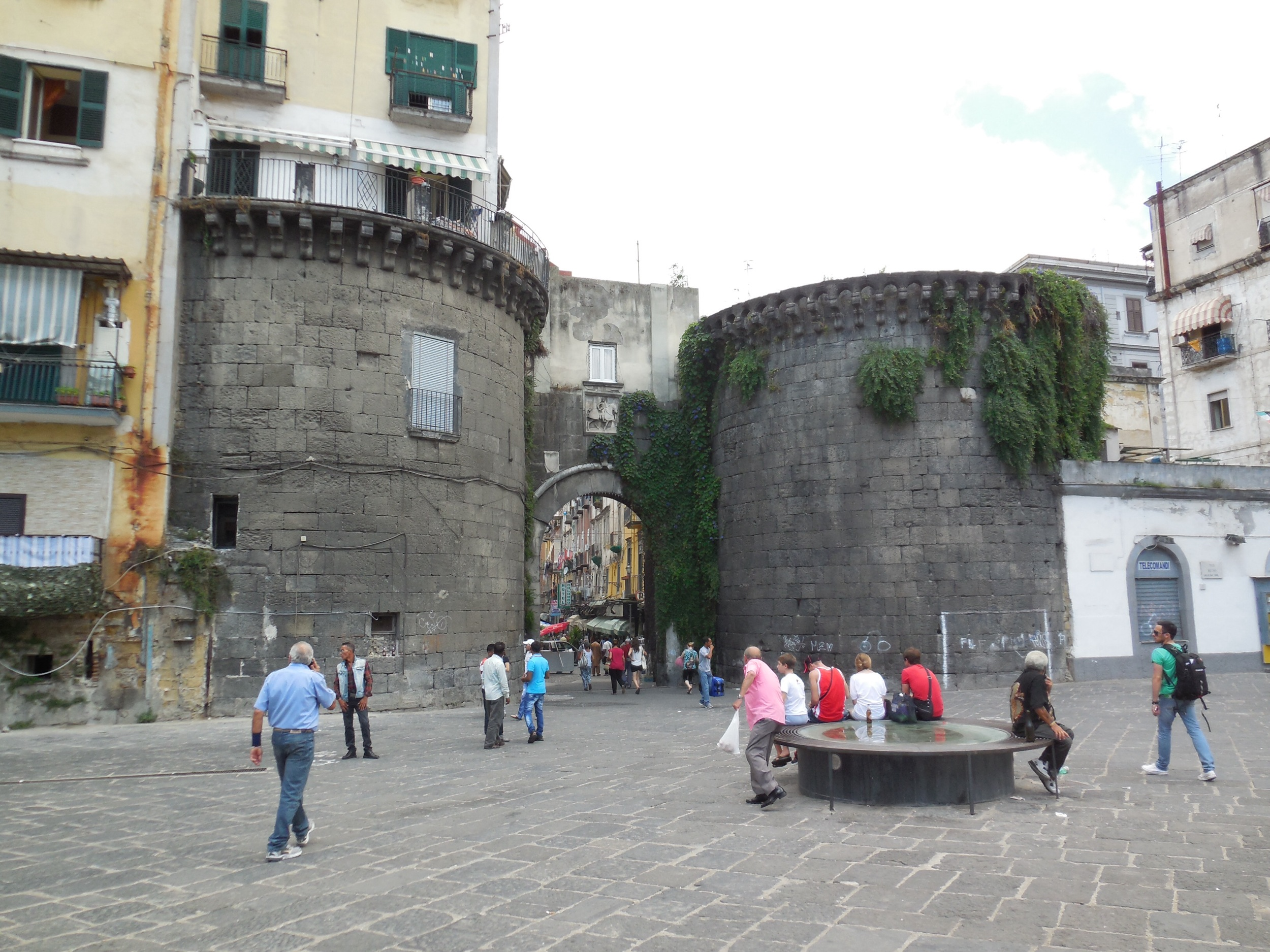
Porta Nolana.

The Mercato di Porta Nolana (Porta Nolana Market) is a pedestrian market, mainly of seafood and produce on via Nolana in Naples, Italy. It is most crowded in the night before Christmas Eve when the locals buy the seafood for the traditional meals. It is located off Piazza Nolana, parallel to Corso Giuseppe Garibaldi, thru Porta Nolana, near a local train station, Porta Nolana with the Circumvesuviana lines.
