= Santi Cosma e Damiano a Porta Nolana =

Coordinates: 40.8503°N 14.2688°E

Church of Santi Cosma e Damiano a Porta Nolana
- Chiesa di Santi Cosma e Damiano a Porta Nolana
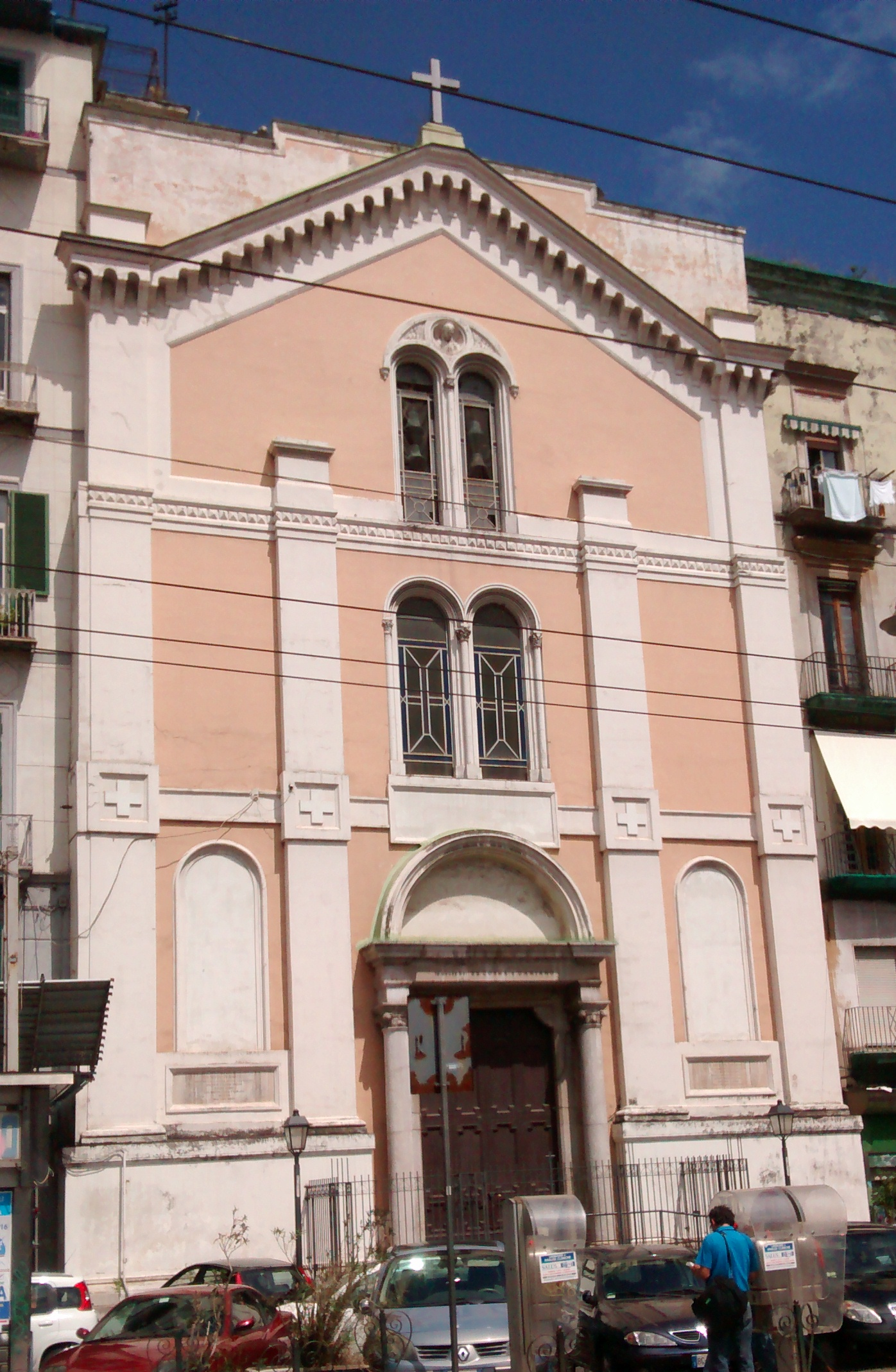
- The church of Santi Cosma e Damiano a Porta Nolana in Naples.
- Church of Santi Cosma e Damiano a Porta Nolana
- Location: Naples; Metropolitan City of Naples, Campania
- Country: Italy
- Denomination: Roman Catholic

History
- Status: Active

Architecture
- Architectural type: Church

Administration
- Diocese: Roman Catholic Archdiocese of Naples

The church of Santi Cosma e Damiano a Porta Nolana is a Baroque-style church in central Naples.

The church was commissioned by the guild of physicians, and built in 1611. The church was located across the Corso Giuseppe Garibaldi from the gate of Porta Nolana. During the 19th century urban renewal, the church was moved (1852) to widen Corso Garibaldi. The interior still contains many frescoes and original canvases. The belltower was added in the 19th century.
