= Alifana railway =

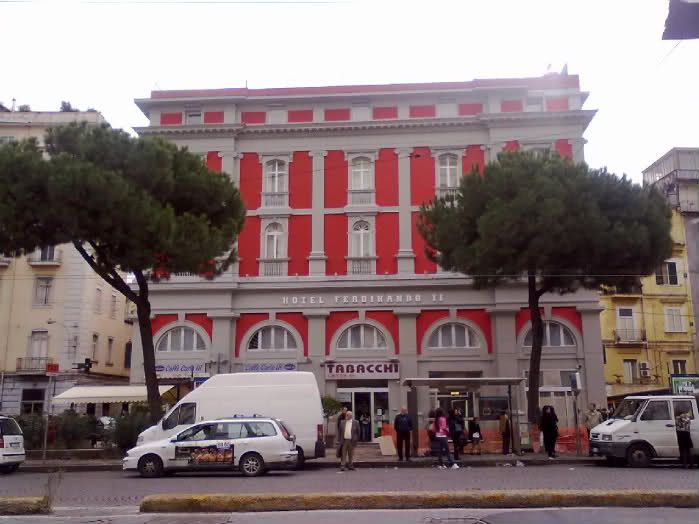
The former Alifana railway terminal station, Piazza Carlo III, Naples.

The Alifana Railway (in Italian Ferrovia Alifana) is a regional railway line located in the Campania region of Italy, historically divided into two different sections, "alta" (high) and "bassa" (low, in a geographical sense), of which the first branch is still operational, while the second branch was operational between 1913 and 1976. The name derives from that of the area of the same name in which the Piedimonte d'Alife terminal station is located, called, since 1974, Piedimonte Matese. The lines, owned by the Campania Region, have been entrusted for management to the Ente Autonomo Volturno (EAV) company, which operates there as both infrastructure manager and railway company.

== History ==
The railway was inaugurated on 30 March 1913, with a first service held on the line Naples P.zza Carlo III Station-Santa Maria Capua Vetere/S.Andrea dei Lagni-Biforcazione-Capua (43 km), with 11,000 V 25 Hz monophase AC electric traction. Service from Caiazzo to Piedimonte began in 1914, held with steam locomotives. A line from Naples/Secondigliano to Santa Maria Capua Vetere was opened later. Gauge was 935 mm for both lines.

The railway suffered heavy damage during World War II. While the first line was restored in 1963, using standard gauge and diesel traction, the railway from Secondigliano did not receive the same attention, and, despite its high traffic, was closed in 1976 and replaced by bus service. This move was to be temporary, but only in 2005 a renewed section of the line, connecting Piscinola to Mugnano, was reopened.

In the same year the whole service on the Alifana railway was acquired by the new public company MetroCampania NordEst. The company is currently responsible of the service from Santa Maria Capua Vetere station, which had connection with the Trenitalia line to Naples, to Piedimonte Matese, and from Piscinola to Mugnano (to be extended to Teverola).
