= Porta San Gennaro =

Coordinates: 40.855121°N 14.256151°E

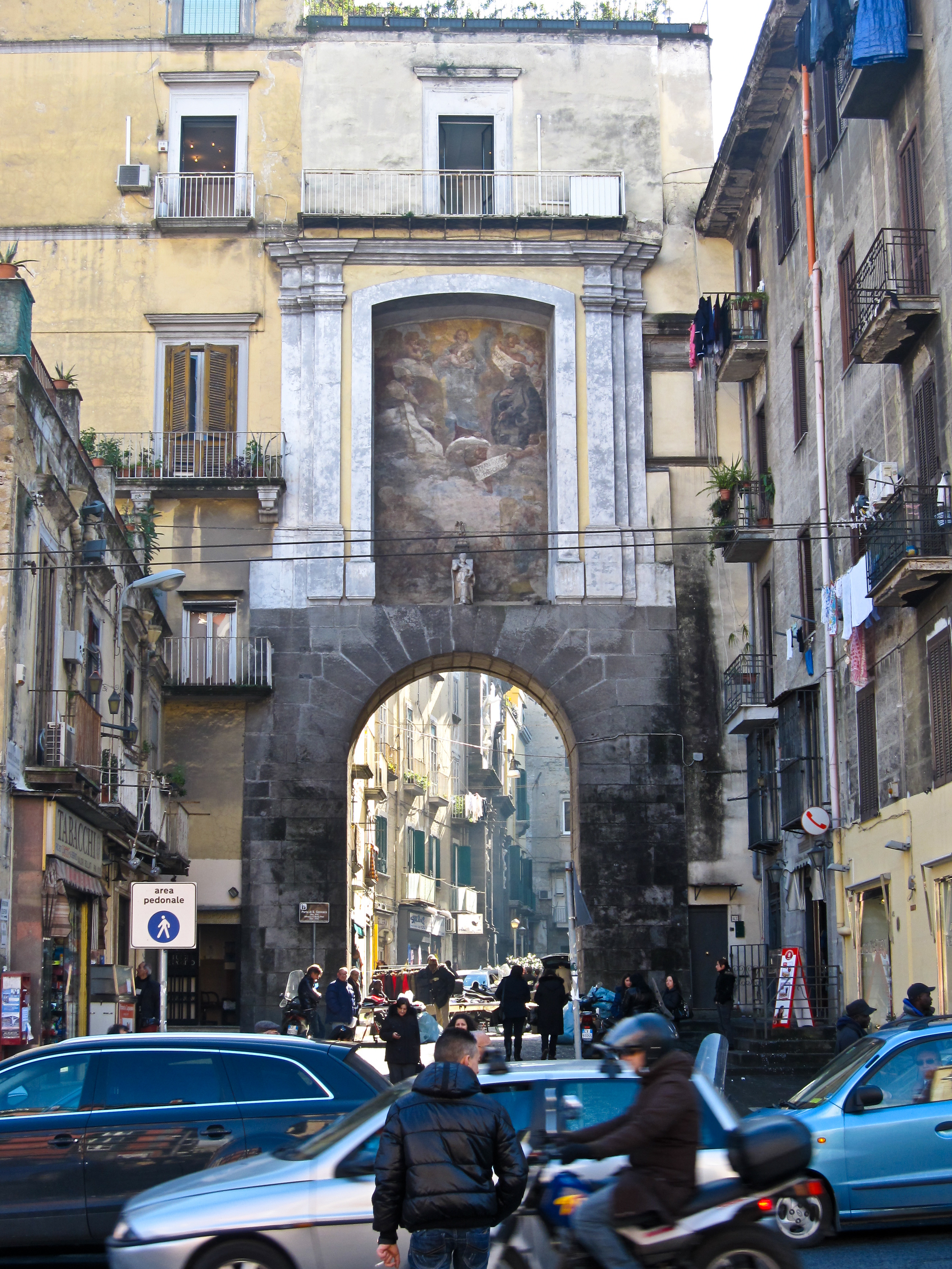
Porta San Gennaro, view from the North, from Via Foria.

The Porta San Gennaro is one of the ancient gates of the city of Naples, located just southwest of the edge of the Piazza Cavour, just off the busy Via Foria and leading to a pedestrian alley, just east and parallel to Via Duomo.

== History ==
This is not the original location of this gate, which documents state was the original portal which lead north out of the city, and towards the Catacombs of San Gennaro. Documents from before the year 1000 speak of a gate of this name, legend holds that it was around during the time of the late Roman Empire. It appears to have once stood some 100 meters south on the same alleyway, adjacent to the church of Gesù delle Monache, and moved in 1537 by the Spanish viceroy Don Pedro de Toledo, in his efforts to enlarge the city. In doing so, he razed the towers that flanked the gate. These were likely similar to those now flanking the Porta Capuana.

The Gate houses a small chapel, and the northern approach has a restored fresco (1656) belonging to Mattia Preti, the sole remainder of frescoes he painted at seven town gates, this one depicting San Gennaro and Francis Xavier showing devotion to the Immaculata and Child as an ex voto to spare the town from the plague. The southern approach has a Bust of San Gaetano (1659) by Bartolomeo Mori placed by members of the Theatine order. The inside gate, adjacent to an aedicule of the Virgin, has a small chapel-church, San Francesco dei Cocchieri, now deconsecrated and shuttered.
