= 3rd municipality of Naples =

Third Municipality of Naples Municipalità 3 Terza Municipalità
- Borough
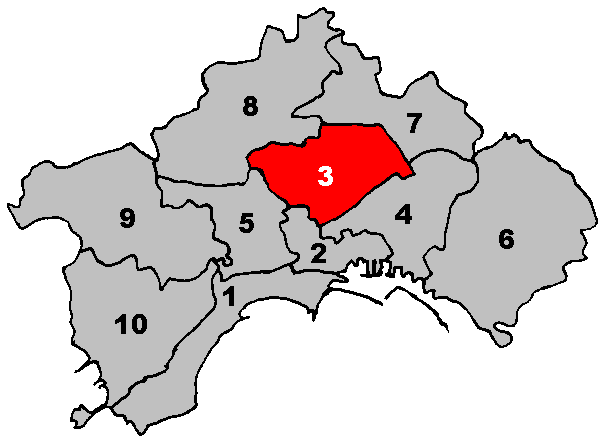
- Location within Naples
- Coordinates: 40°52′25.6″N 14°14′48.61″E
- Country: Italy
- Municipality: Naples
- Established: 2005
- Seat: Via Lieti, 91

Government
  - President: Ivo Poggiani

Area
  - Total: 9.51 km^{2} (3.67 sq mi)

Population (2007)
  - Total: 103,633
  - Density: 11,000/km^{2} (28,000/sq mi)
- Website: M3 on Naples site

The Third Municipality (In Italian: Terza Municipalità or Municipalità 3) is one of the ten boroughs in which the Italian city of Naples is divided.

== Geography ==
The municipality is located in central and northern area of the city, including a large bit of the historical center.

Its territory includes the zones of Colli Aminei, Rione Sanità and Capodimonte, famous for the museum, the park and the palace.

== Administrative division ==
The Third Municipality is divided into 2 quarters:

Quarter	Population	Area (km²)
San Carlo all'Arena	72,933	7.64
Stella	30,700	1.87
Total	103,633	9.51
