= Concezione a Materdei =

Church in Materdei, Naples, Italy

Coordinates: 40.854502°N 14.245062°E

The Church of the Concezione a Materdei is a church in the zone of Materdei in Naples, Italy.

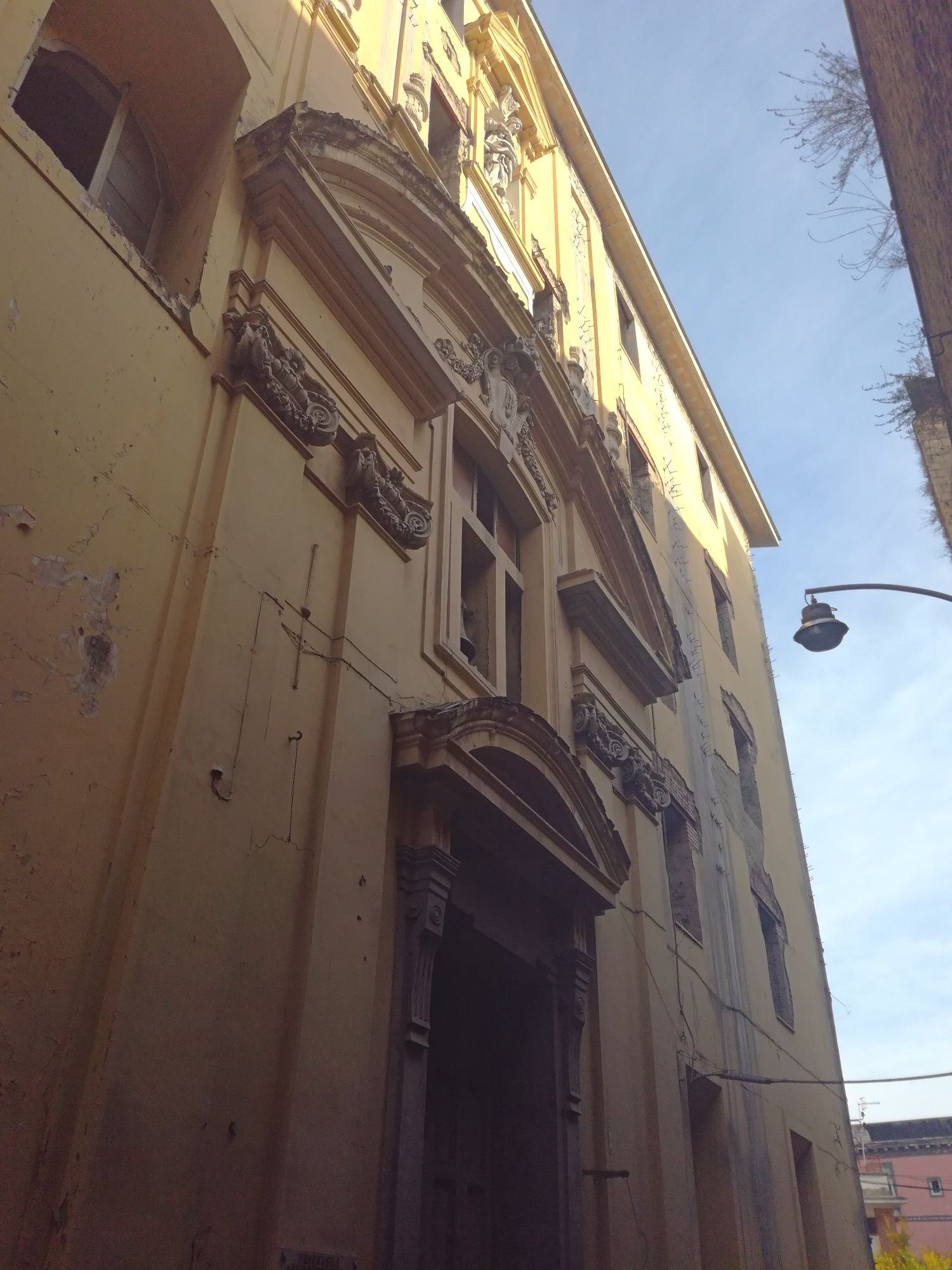
Exterior

Building was begun in 1743, and included a conservatory for children. Reconstructed in the present configuration in 1789. The conservatory fell under the leadership of a royal magistrate.

The interior has an altar whose design is attributed to Domenico Antonio Vaccaro, or his studio. This Jesuits esteemed this architect and commissioned the silver statue of the Immacolata for the church of the Gesù Nuovo. Near the chapel on the right is the underground tomb of the Serra family from the Duchy of Cassano. The architect of the Spire (Guglia) of the Immaculate Conception, near the church, is attributed to Giuseppe Astarita. Before placement in its present place, it was in the courtyard of the conservatory. The church versa in a dilapidated state and closed to visitors in 2012.

== Gallery ==
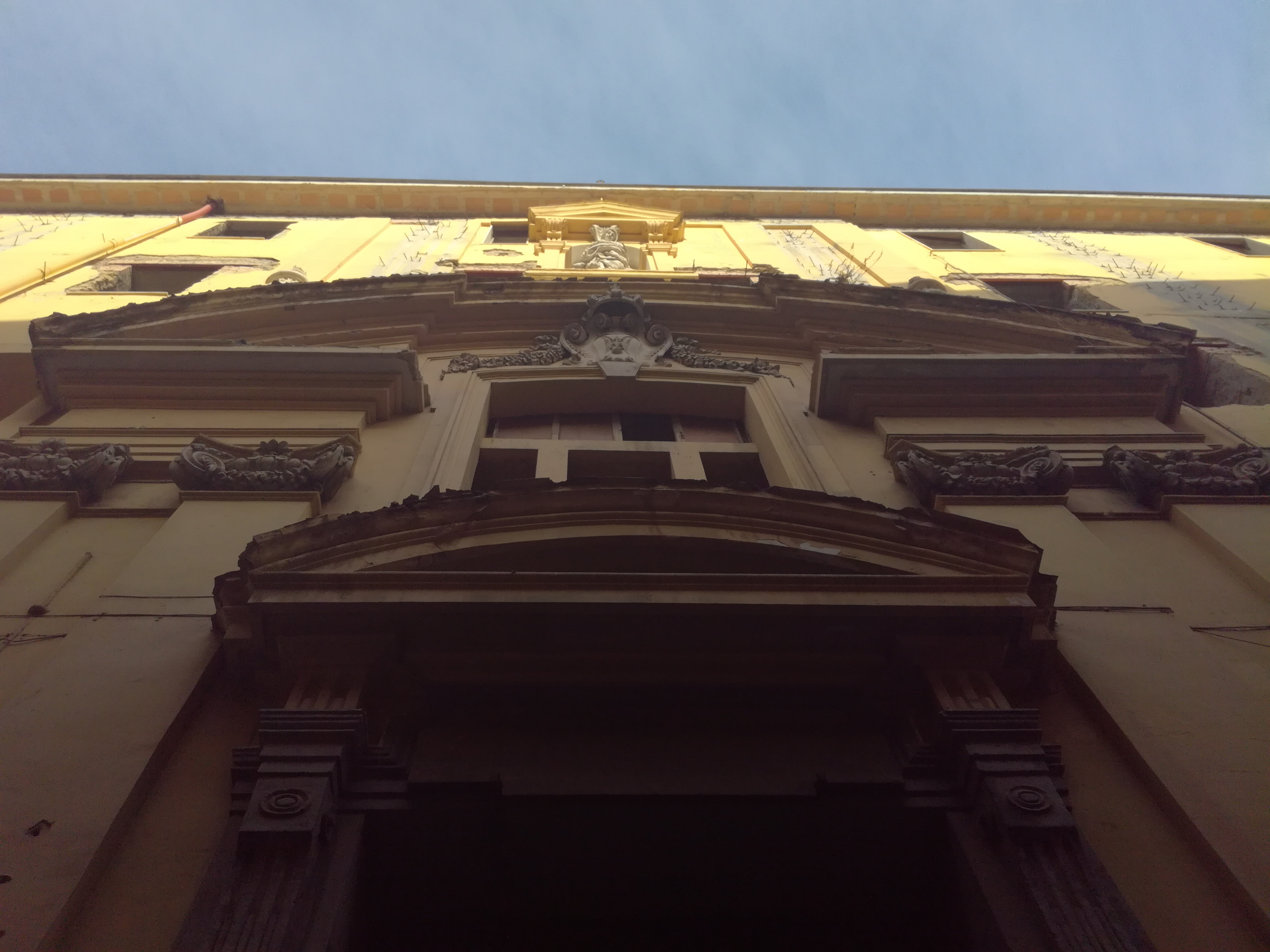
Facade

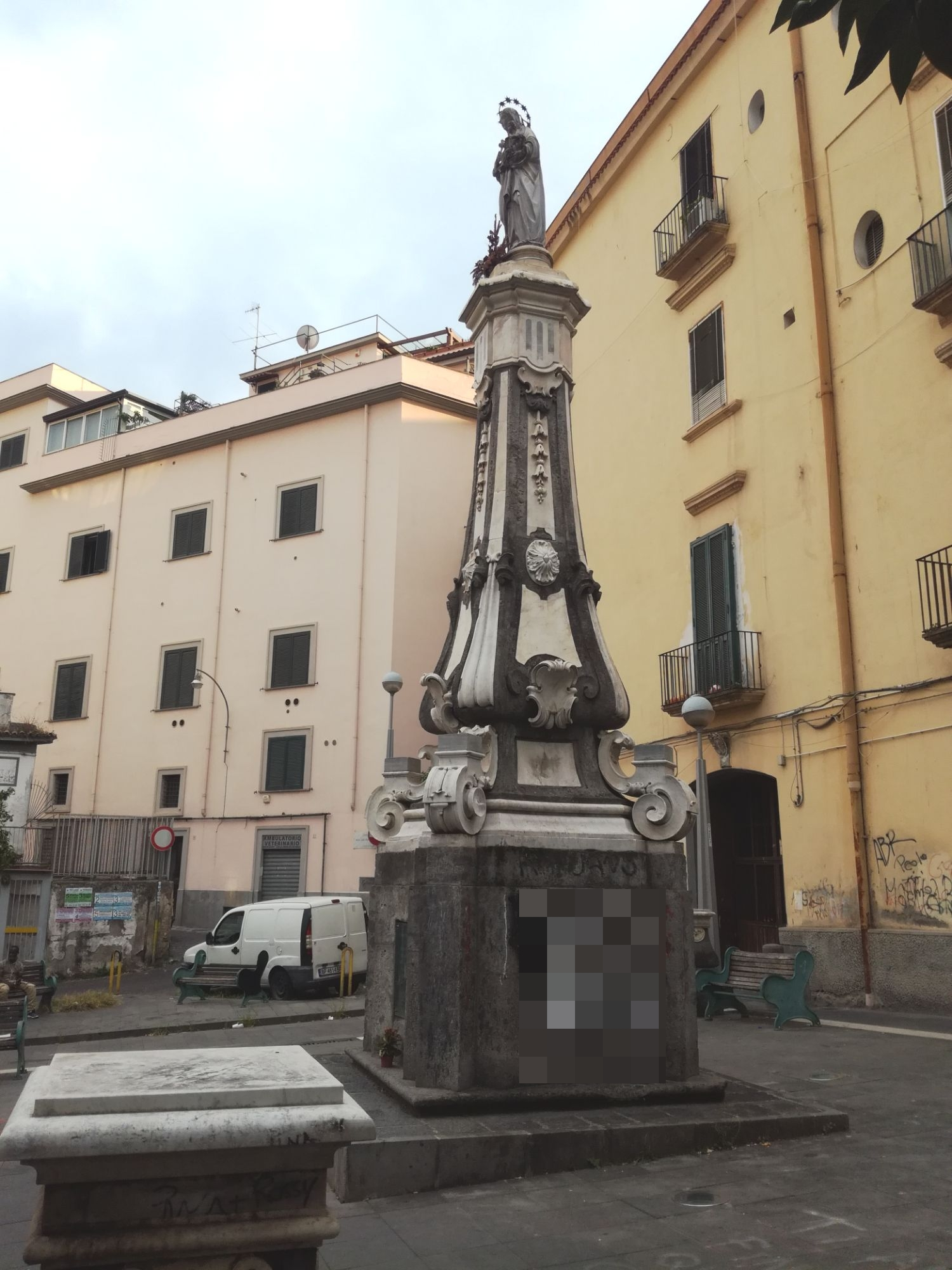
Guglia dell'Immacolata

== Bibliography ==
- Alfonso Gambardella e Giosi Amirante, Napoli Fuori le Mura. La Costigliola e Fonseca da platee a borgo, Naples, Edizioni scientifiche italiane, 1994.
