= San Carlo all'Arena (church) =

Church in Naples, Italy

Coordinates: 40.856794°N 14.257930°E

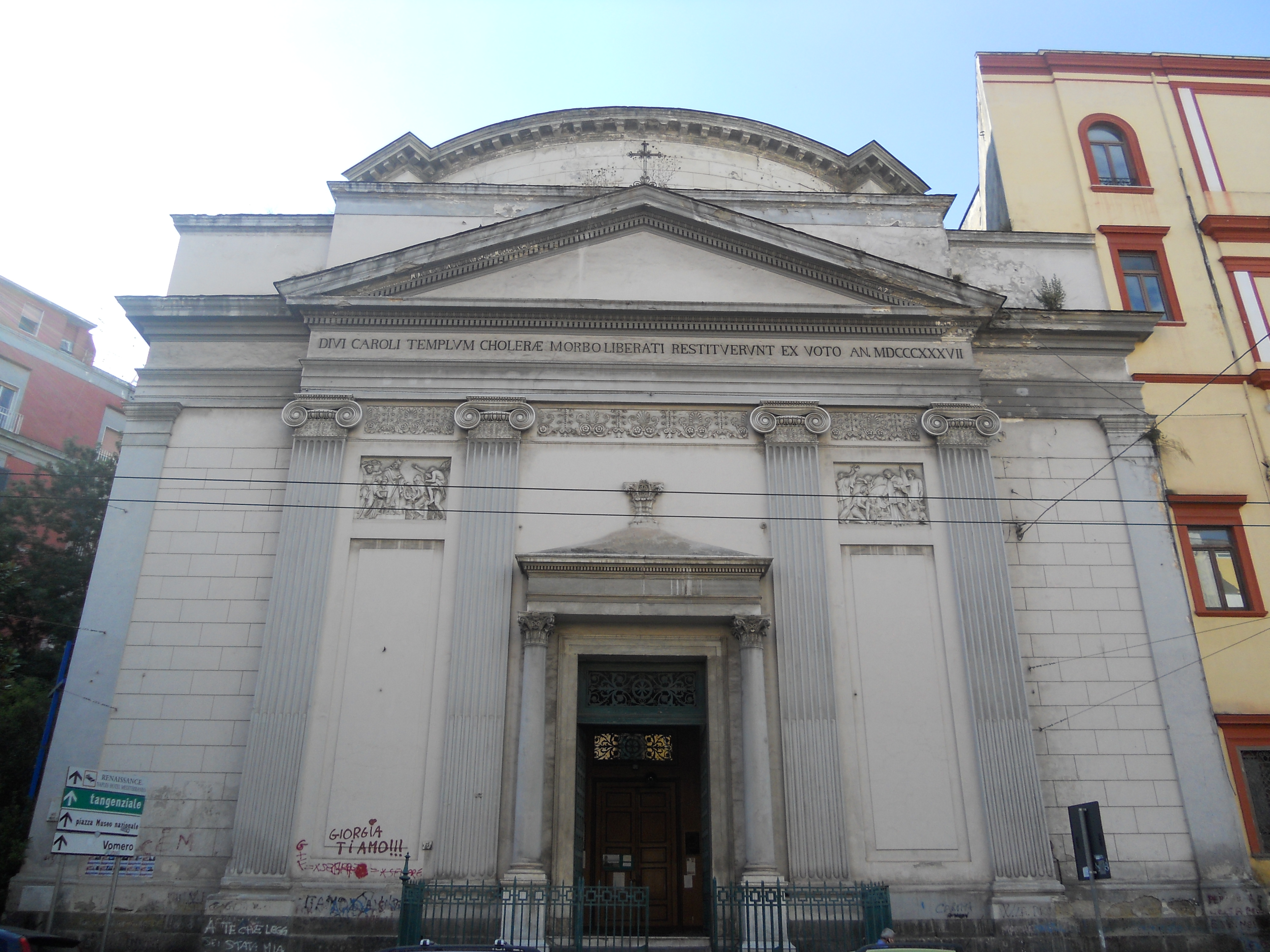
Façade.

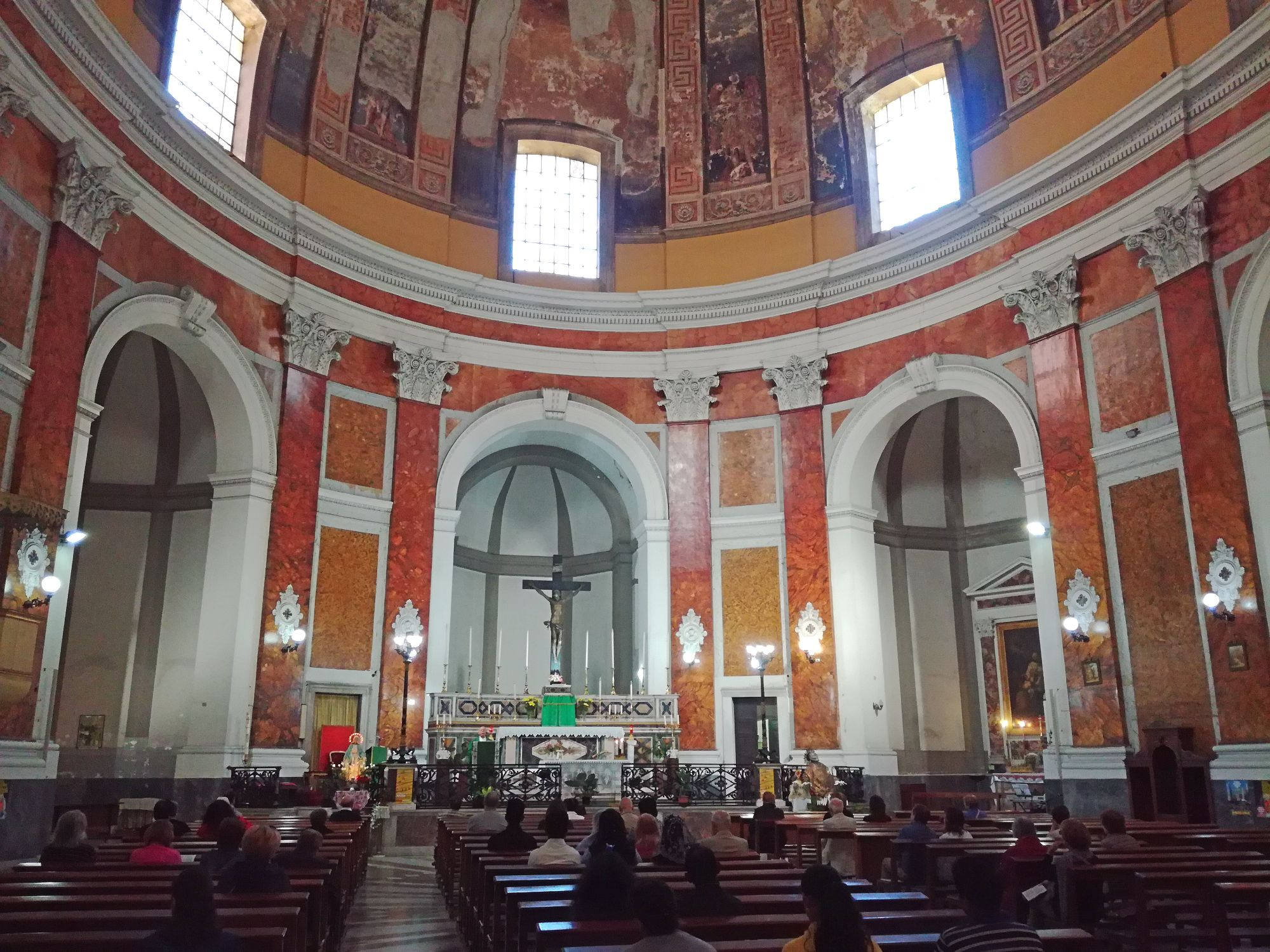
Interior of San Carlo all'Arena

San Carlo all'Arena is a Roman Catholic church built in a Baroque-style layout with a Neoclassic façade, and located on via Foria in the quartiere or neighborhood of the San Carlo all'Arena, in the city of Naples, Italy.

== History ==
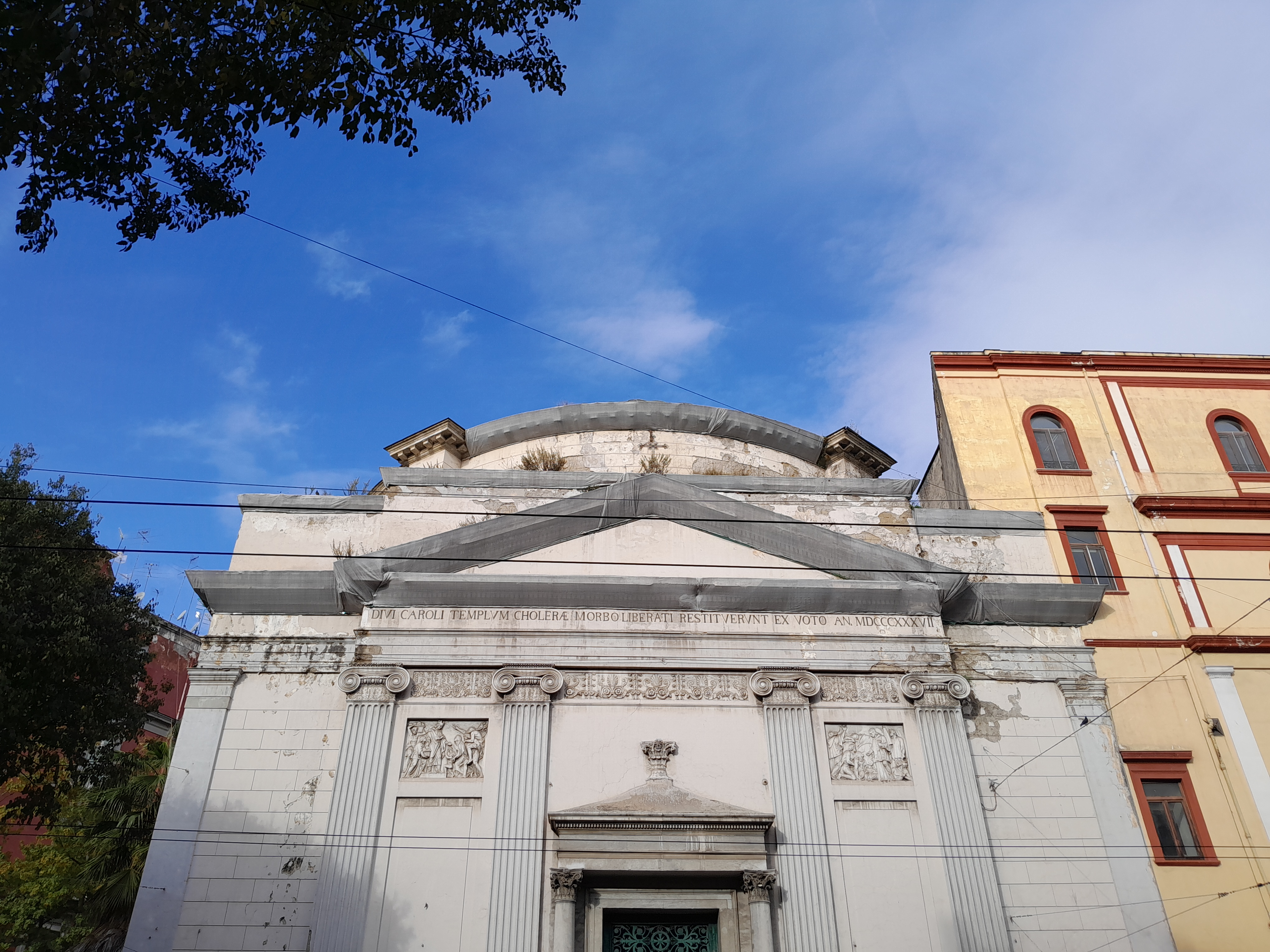
Exterior

Originally a church annexed to a Cistercian Convent. The building was designed by Fra Giuseppe Nuvolo, and built initially by Silvestro Cordella. Construction was prolonged from 1631-1681. The church takes its name from the sandy ground upon it was built. In 1837, it underwent restoration by Francesco de Cesare, and an oval dome was added in the early 19th century. While the Cistercians were dispossessed of the property with the Napoleonic occupation, they regained the property in 1836 till the order was suppressed upon integration of Naples to the Italian state.

The interior has bas-reliefs by Vincenzo Annibale depicting a story from the Life of San Carlo and a Christ. A partially damaged, but much revered, crucifix (1599) by Michelangelo Naccherino, once stood in the Basilica dello Spirito Santo. Gennaro Maldarelli frescoed the cupola. Michele di Napoli painted a San Francesco di Paola. Giuseppe Mancinelli painted Carlo Borromeo providing the Viaticum to victims of the Plague.

== See also ==
- 17th-century Western domes

== Sources ==
- Napier, Lord Francis (1855). Notes on Modern Painting at Naples.. West Strand, London: John W. Parker and Son.
- Portions derived from Italian Wikipedia entry.
