= Piazza Carlo III =

Square in Naples, Italy

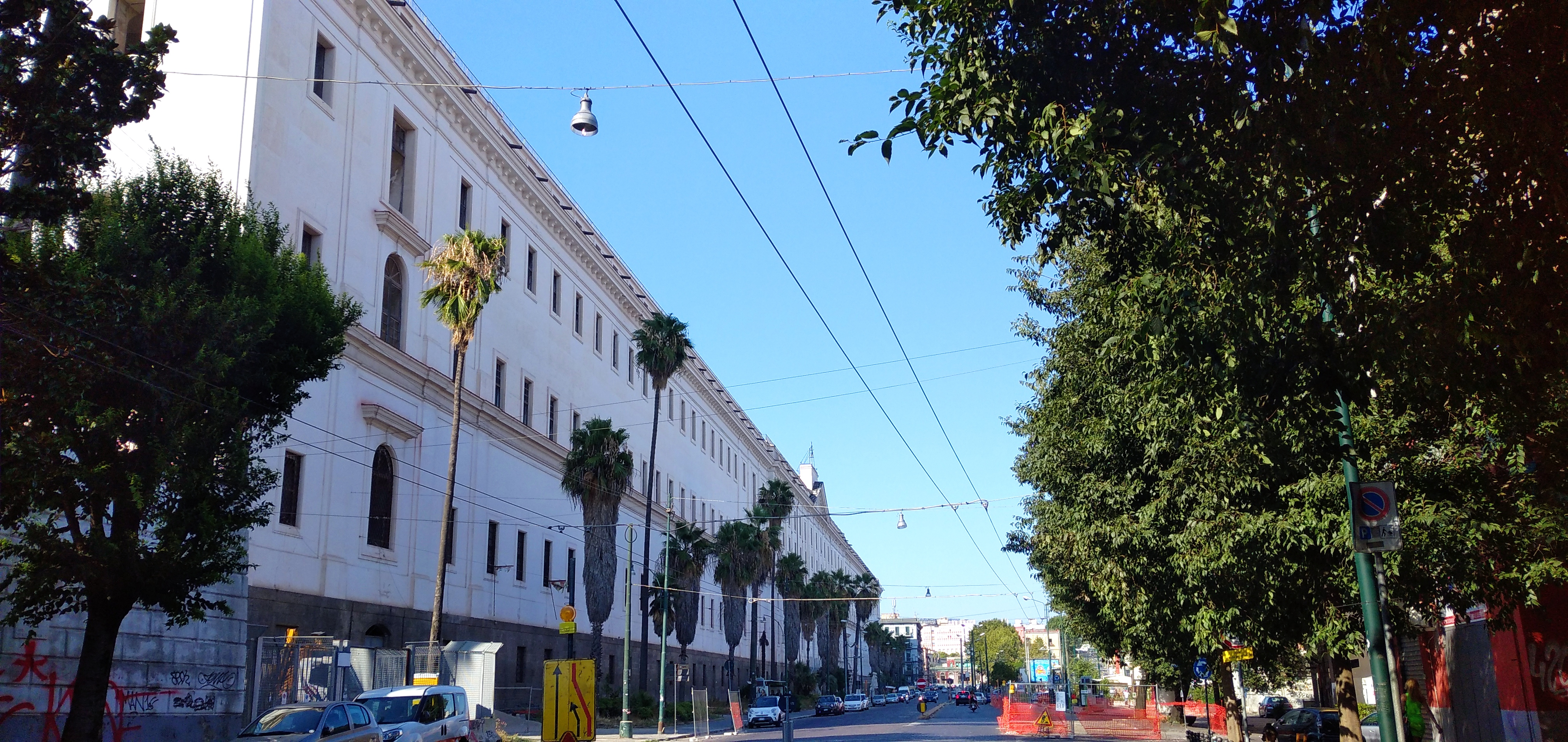
- Piazza Carlo III is dominated by the mass of the Real Albergo dei Poveri, a work of architectural mastery by Ferdinando Fuga
- Interactive map of Piazza Carlo III
- Former name: Piazza del Reclusorio
- Namesake: Charles III of Spain
- Location: San Lorenzo; San Carlo all'Arena (Historic Centre of Naples)

Construction
- Construction start: 19th century

Piazza Carlo III (called Piazza del Reclusorio until 1891, when, by decree of royal commissioner Giuseppe Saredo, it was named after the Bourbon King Charles III of Spain) is a square in Naples, located between the districts of San Lorenzo (for the most part) and San Carlo all'Arena.

Situated at the end of via Foria, the square forms the eastern gateway to the historic centre of the city.

== History ==
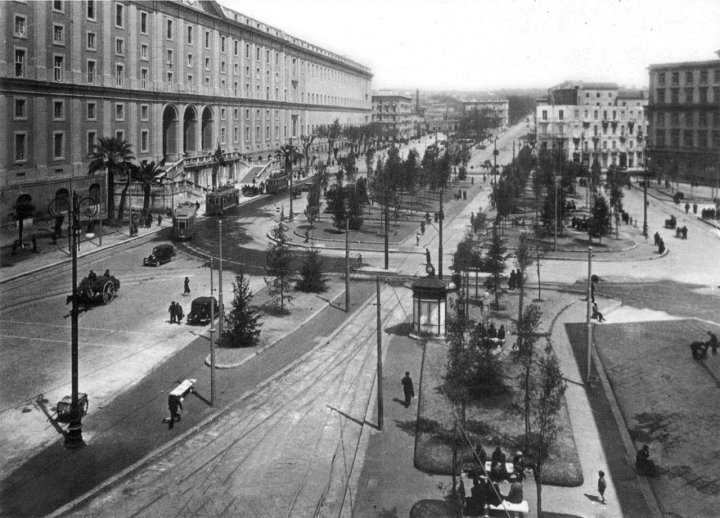
Piazza Carlo III in the 1930s.

The square, as such, came into being in the 19th century with the urbanization of the area and in particular with the construction of Corso Garibaldi.

In the previous century, the Florentine architect Ferdinando Fuga built one of the largest buildings of the 18th century at the end of via Foria: the colossal Real Albergo dei Poveri, a massive palace commissioned by Charles of Bourbon, who cherished the wish to make it a dignified residence for all the poor of the kingdom. But in front of the huge building there was nothing but a vast open space, in an area almost entirely free of dwellings, which were instead found in the nearby Borgo Sant'Antonio Abate.

With the city's expansion eastward, the square later also became an important railway hub: in 1913 the Alifana railway opened, with its terminus located right on the square. The railway, which came from Capodichino via what is today via Don Bosco, ran through the centre of the square, its tracks multiplying in the south-western section near the Church of Sant'Antonio Abate, where the station building stood.

The terminal station remained in operation until 1955, when the automobile began to make its presence felt in Naples too, as elsewhere in Italy. Crossing the square was in fact an obstacle to the growing (though still incomparable to today's) motor traffic.

In 2009, the Fourth Municipality of Naples planned the redevelopment of the first stretch of the square, and in October 2010 renovation works began; they lasted until May 2011, resumed in 2016 under the Municipality of Naples, and were finally completed in June 2017.

== Description ==
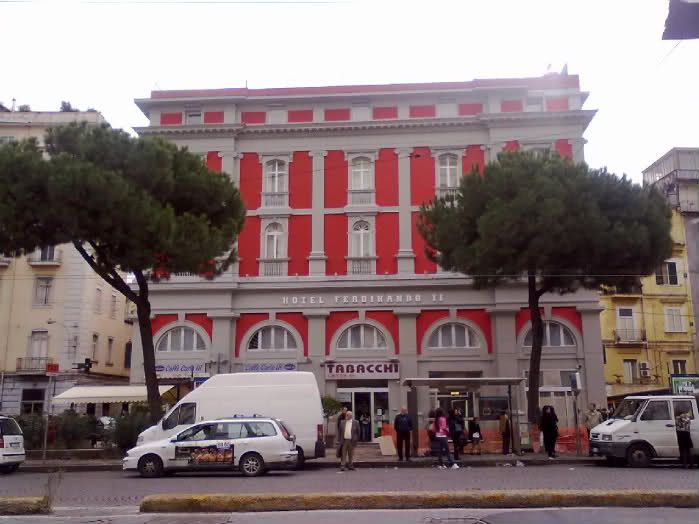
The former Alifana railway terminal station

Bordering Borgo Sant'Antonio Abate, the square has a semicircular shape into which several important thoroughfares of the area converge: via Foria, Corso Garibaldi, via Sant'Alfonso Maria de' Liguori, via Sant'Antonio Abate, via Giovanni Gussone, via Alessio Mazzocchi, and via Don Bosco.

At its centre lies an island with flowerbeds covered in palm trees and a central avenue created by reusing the disused railway bed. To the north stands the massive Albergo dei Poveri.

The former terminal station of the Alifana railway still stands on the square today, though only the signage on its façade survives. The Alifana building currently houses a hotel.

== Bibliography ==
- Gino Doria. Le strade di Napoli. Saggio di toponomastica storica. 2nd ed. Milan-Naples: Riccardo Ricciardi Editore, 1979.
- Gennaro Ruggiero. Le piazze di Napoli. Tascabili economici Newton, Rome, 1998. ISBN 88-7983-846-6.
