= Map of the Duke of Noja =

Topographic map of Naples, 1775

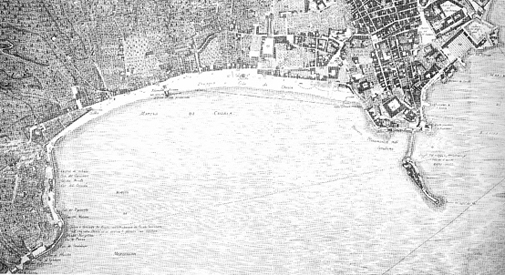
Detail of the Map of the Duke of Nojo, at Naples' Castel dell'Ovo and the Palazzo Reale d'Napoli

The Map of the Duke of Noja is a topographic map of city of Naples and its environs, created in 1775. It was the primary topographic and urban planning tool for Naples between the 17th and 19th centuries.

The map was an important cartographic and urban planning tool for the city, an embellished art piece, and has been used even recently, for example, to document the genesis and original layout of a group of over one hundred twenty 18th and 19th century Villas, partly located in Herculaneum and Torre del Greco, collectively known as the Vesuvian Villas of the Golden Mile.

== History ==
The commissioning of the cartographic study depicting Naples and its environs dates to April 29, 1750, when the Tribunal of Electors of San Lorenzo entrusted its execution to Giovanni Carafa, Duke of Noja. The work relied technically on the skilled land surveyor Vanti. Originally projected to take two and half years, in reality the work took much longer.

The use of the Plane table (tavoli praetorian) made the Noja Map the first true map of the Naples, it's underlying data was based on rigorous survey and topographical accuracy and was much closer to reality than were the bird's-eye views of previous centuries.

When Carafa died 1768, the project was not complete and passed to the direction of Giovanni Pignatelli, prince of Monteroduni, who in turn enlisted the aid of architect Gaetano Brunzuoli, as technical superintendent. Brunuoili, who was at the time completing the construction of the Duke of Noja's house. Brunzuoli's work updated the mapping to depict the urban changes that had occurred over the course of the work. The cartography was completed in 1775 and was accompanied by a topographical index created by Nicola Carletti, professor of architecture and mathematics at the University of Naples and architect of the city of Naples. The first hundred copies were made by the royal printer Vittorio Barbacci, while subsequent copies were published by the Roman printer, Antonio Cenci. The cartography was sold to the for ten ducats per copy. Subsequently, the price reduced to six ducates to facilitate its propagation — which was however very limited by the high cost of reproduction.

- Interactive Map of the Duke of Nojo

== The map ==
The map combines 35 plates into a single large image, each plate made by impression on copper by engravers Giuseppe Aloja, Gaetano Cacace, Pietro Campana and Francesco Lamarra. The depiction dispenses with axonometry and any form of elevation, showing instead the city and surrounding area in a completely orthogonal projection that extends to the ground plans of individual buildings. The sheer size of the immense final map is 5,016 meters wide x 2,376 meters high and its graphic scale was 1:3808.

In addition to its purpose as a topographical document, the map was also intended as an objet d'art. An inset over the Bay of Naples features a large panoramic drawing of Naples and below that a large legend references 580 detailed historical and artistic points of interest. The upper part of the map presents the title, the dedication to Charles III on the left, and a collection of the coats of arms, divided by seat, of 134 Neapolitan noble families, as well as the royal coat of arms.

The importance of the map is linked both to its accurate depiction of the urban changes that took place in the city of Naples and its environs during the reign of Charles of Bourbon and his son Ferdinand IV, but also its role as an urban planning tool. In the latter role, certain projected buildings were represented conjecturally, and do not necessarily align with their final form. The Naples Royal Hospice for the Poor (L'Albergo Reale dei Poveri), for example, an immense structure begun in 1751 by Ferdinando Fuga, intended to house and support the poor of the Kingdom of Naples, is shown in plan view as it was designed, as a rectangule, 600 meters long and 150 meters wide. In reality, its construction was interrupted in 1819 when the facility had only reached a length of 384 meters.

Nonetheless, the desire to provide the Kingdom with a tool for urban planning is noteworthy, tending, in Carafa's own words, to provide a "geometric delineation of the city."
