= Sant'Antonio Abate, Naples =

Church of Sant'Antonio Abate
- Chiesa di Sant'Antonio Abate
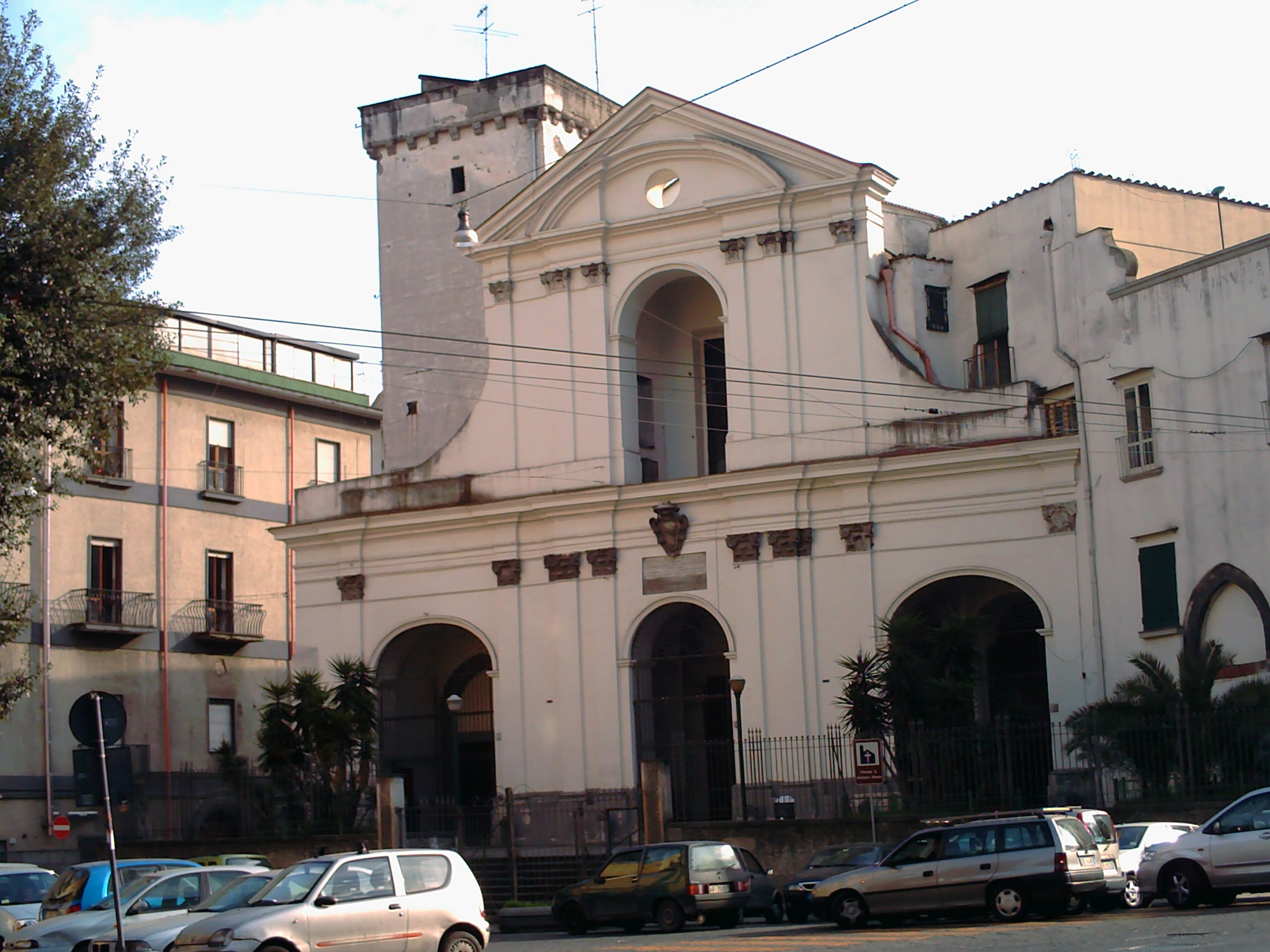
- The façade of church of Sant'Antonio Abate.
- Church of Sant'Antonio Abate
- 40.8612°N 14.2651°E
- Location: Borgo Sant'Antonio Abate; Naples; Province of Naples, Campania
- Country: Italy
- Denomination: Roman Catholic

History
- Status: Active

Architecture
- Architectural type: Church
- Style: Baroque architecture

Administration
- Diocese: Roman Catholic Archdiocese of Naples

Sant'Antonio Abate is an ancient church of Naples, located at the beginning of the village of the same name: Borgo Sant'Antonio Abate.

Legend has it that the church, placed at the origin of the village of the same name, was founded at the behest of Queen Joanna I of Anjou, but a diploma of King Robert of Anjou, shows that, as early as March 1313, there were church and hospital and that in this place the sick were cured of the disease called "sacred fire" or shingles, a product derived from pig fat.

This church was the site of the Sacred Military Constantinian Order of Saint George.

In this church there are two most important paintings by Luca Giordano.
