= Porta Nolana =

Medieval city gate in Naples, Italy

Coordinates: 40.850278°N 14.267918°E

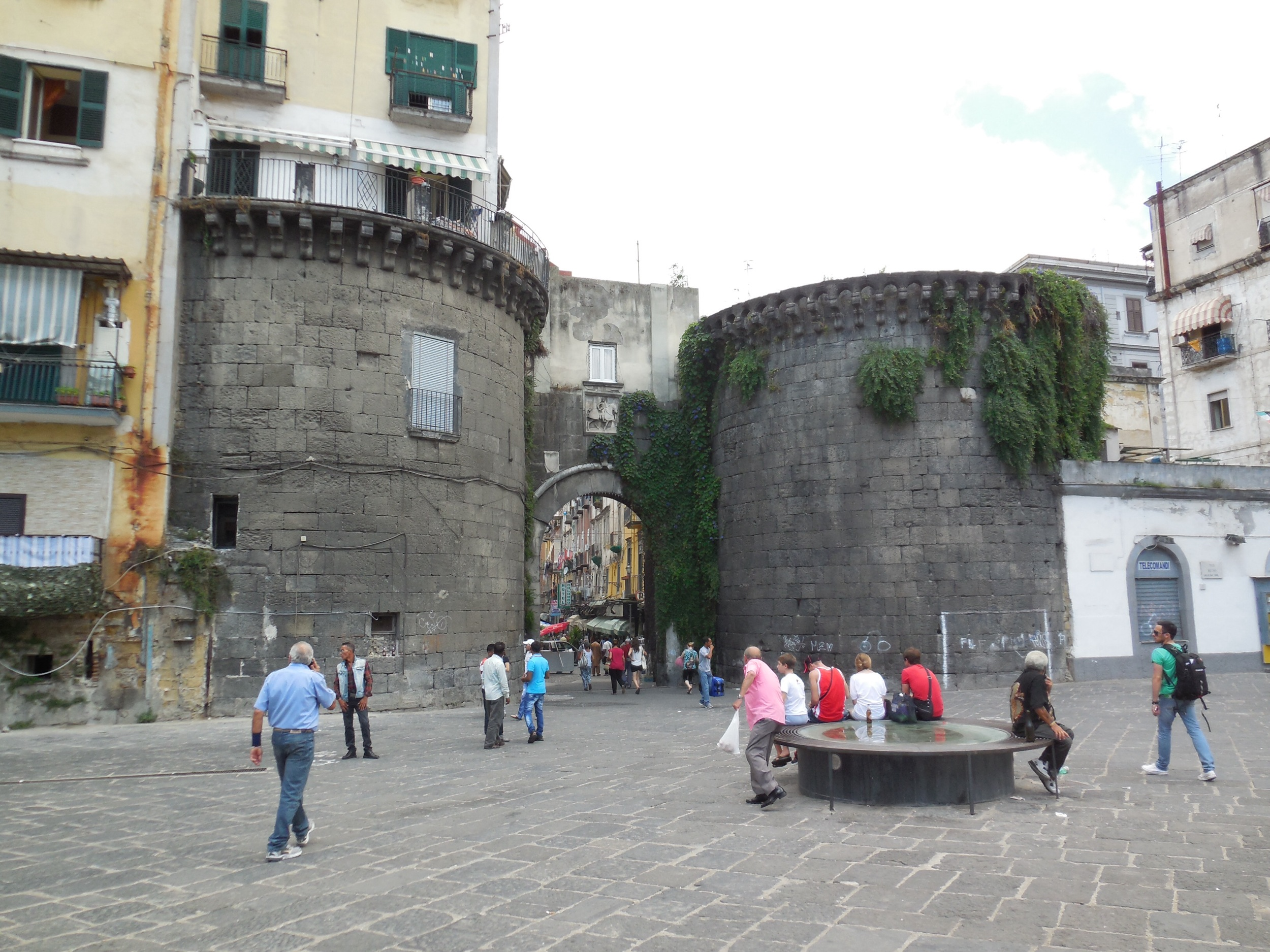
Porta Nolana.

The Porta Nolana is the remnant of one of the medieval city gates in Naples, Italy. It is located in Piazza Nolana, near a local train station, Napoli Porta Nolana with the Circumvesuviana lines, and a bustling local pedestrian market, Mercato di Porta Nolano, known for seafood. It takes its name from the road that lead to Nola.

The gate was erected in the 15th century by the Spanish authorities using designs of Giuliano da Maiano, to encompass the growing city, and replace the interior gate of the district of Forcella, also known as del Cannavaro, which had been located near the Basilica dell'Annunziata. This gate, unlike it contemporary Porta San Gennaro, has lost its frescoes by Mattia Preti, but like Porta Capuana, it retains the flanking bastions (towers) made of Piperno rock: the Torre della Fede (Tower of Faith) to the south, and the Torre della Speranza (Tower of Hope) to the North. The external facade of the arch has a relief of Ferrante I on horseback.
