= Botanical Garden of the University of Naples Federico II =

Botanic garden in Italy

Orto botanico dell'Università degli Studi di Napoli Federico II
- Botanical Garden of the University of Naples Federico II
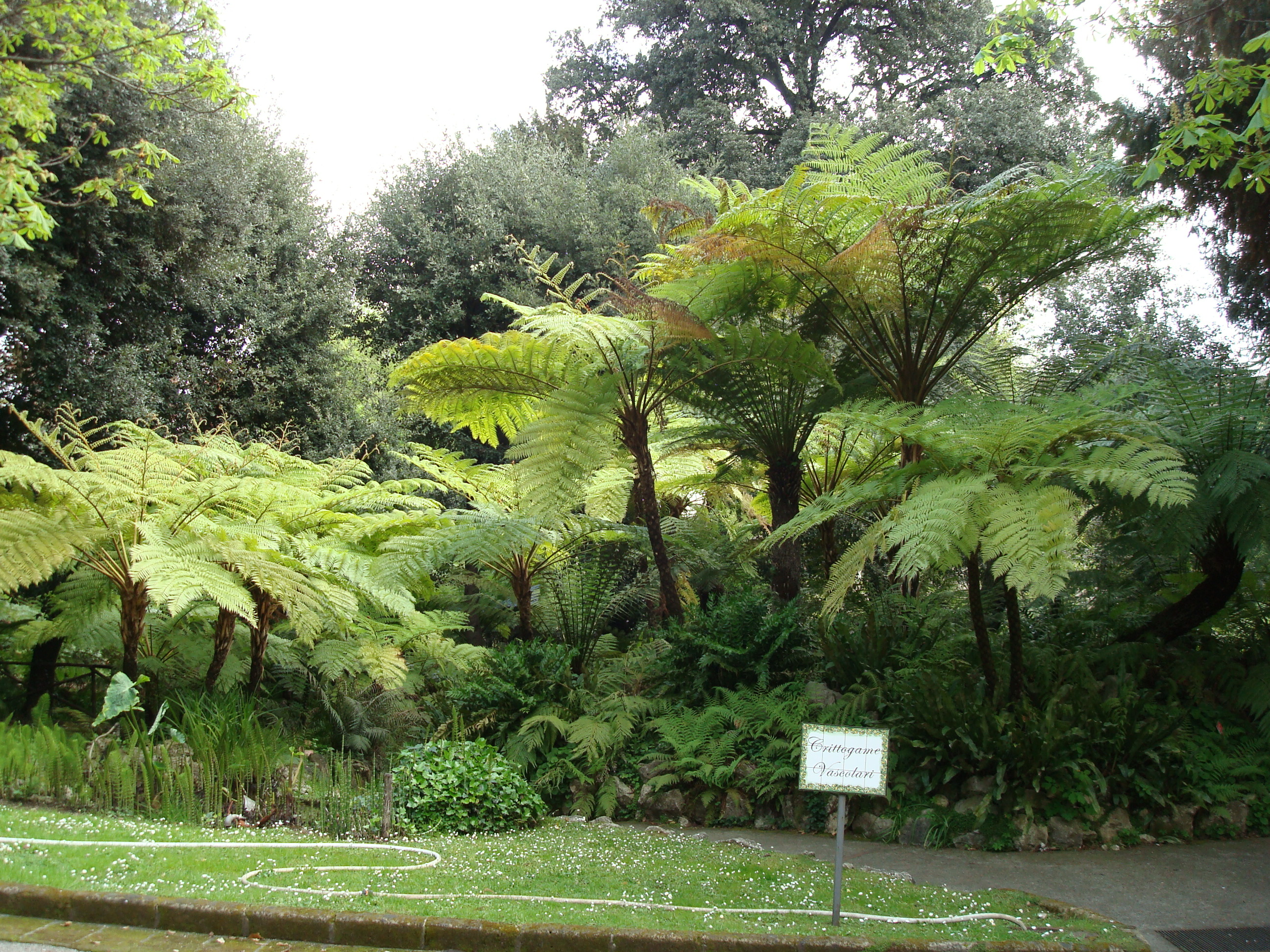
- View of the Botanical Garden of the University of Naples Federico II.
- Interactive map of Orto botanico dell'Università degli Studi di Napoli Federico II
- Type: Botanical garden
- Location: Via Foria, 223, Naples, Campania, Italy
- Coordinates: 40.861359°N 14.262462°E
- Opened: 1810
- Status: Open year round
- Website: Official website

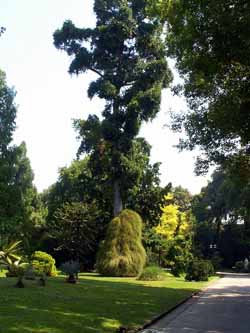
The Botanical Garden in Naples.

The Botanical Garden of the University of Naples Federico II (in Italian: Orto botanico dell'Università degli Studi di Napoli Federico II or simply Orto botanico) is a research facility and botanical garden of the University of Naples Federico II. The premises take up about 15 hectares and are located in via Foria, adjacent to the historical edifice Albergo dei Poveri, the Royal Hospice for the Poor under the Bourbon dynasty. The facility is part of the university's Department of Natural Science. It is one of Naples's many scientific and educational facilities established under French rule (1806–15). The garden opened in 1810.

== Area ==
The premises take up about 15 hectares and are located in via Foria, adjacent to the historical edifice Albergo dei Poveri, the Royal Hospice for the Poor under the Bourbon dynasty. The facility is part of the university's Department of Natural Science. It is one of Naples's many scientific and educational facilities established under French rule (1806–15). The garden opened in 1810.

== Fauna ==
Currently, the garden features around 25,000 samples of flora, representing approximately 10,000 plant species. Although accessible to the public, the garden is not strictly a public park. It is a distinct educational centre for the university and local high schools from the University of Naples's agriculture department. Additionally, the garden is involved in the protection of endangered plant species. There is also a section of the garden devoted to ethnobotany, where medicinally valuable plants for humans are examined. In addition to lesser structures, there are two larger ones on the property: the recently renovated "castle" from the 17th century and the 5,000 square metre Merola Greenhouse. The museum of Paleobotany and Ethnobotany is located in the lecture and display halls of the castle.

== See also ==
- List of botanical gardens in Italy
