= Stella, Naples =

Coordinates: 40°51′23″N 14°14′59″E

Stella
- Quarter of Naples
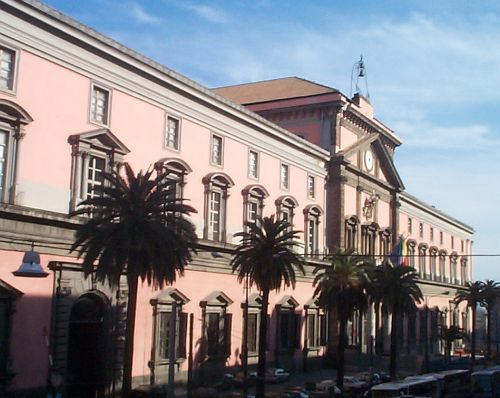
- The National Archaeological Museum of Naples.

- Location of Stella within Naples
- Country: Italy
- Region: Campania
- City: Naples
- Municipalità: 3rd

Area
  - Total: 1.87 km^{2} (0.72 sq mi)

Population
  - Total: 30,483
  - Density: 16,300/km^{2} (42,200/sq mi)
- Postal codes: 80137 and 80138

Stella (Italian: "star") is a neighbourhood of Naples, Italy. The area includes the National Archaeological Museum, stretches north through the Sanità section of the city, up the Capodimonte hill to include the grounds and buildings of the Capodimonte art museum.
