= Borgo Sant'Antonio Abate =

Coordinates: 40°51′28″N 14°15′50″E

- Neighbourhood
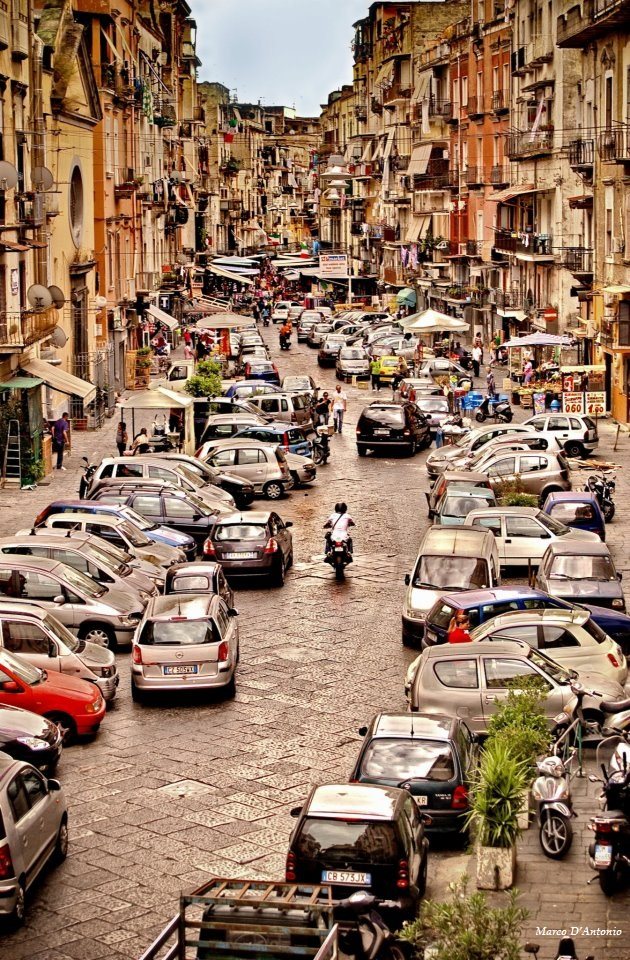
- Interactive map of Borgo Sant'Antonio Abate
- Country: Italy
- Region: Campania
- Metropolitan city: Naples
- City: Naples
- Municipality: 4th municipality
- Quarter: San Lorenzo

The Borgo Sant'Antonio Abate (said Bùvero in Neapolitan) is a neighborhood in Naples, Italy. It was founded in the 15th century.

== Overview ==
The principal street is via Sant'Antonio Abate. It is linked to Porta Capuana and Piazza Carlo III. It is a famous market street.

The two important churches are Chiesa di Sant'Antonio Abate and Chiesa di Sant'Anna a Porta Capuana.
