= Ospedale L'Albergo Reale dei Poveri, Naples =

Former public hospital in Naples, Italy

Coordinates: 40°51′48″N 14°15′56″E

Bourbon Hospice for the Poor
- Albergo Reale dei Poveri
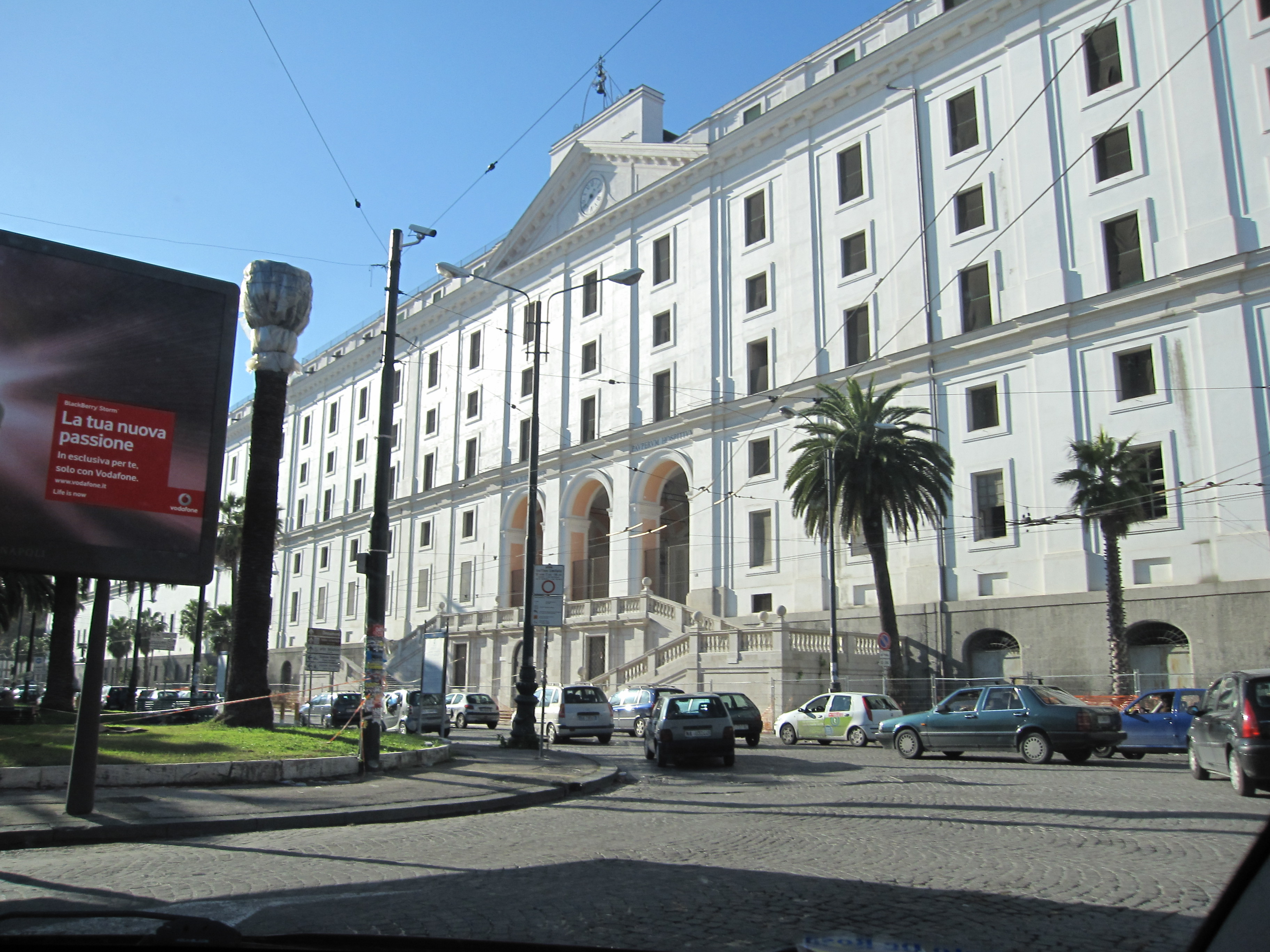
- The recently (2006) restored façade of the Albergo dei Poveri in Naples.
- Interactive map of the Bourbon Hospice for the Poor area
- Alternative names: il Reclusorio

General information
- Type: Palace
- Architectural style: Neoclassicism
- Location: Naples, Italy, Piazza Carlo III, 80132 Naples NA, Italy
- Current tenants: Comune di Napoli
- Construction started: 1751
- Client: Charles III of the House of Bourbon
- Owner: Kingdom of Naples, Kingdom of the Two Sicilies
- Landlord: Comune di Napoli

Technical details
- Floor count: 5

Design and construction
- Architect: Ferdinando Fuga

The Bourbon Hospice for the Poor (Italian: Albergo Reale dei Poveri), also called il Reclusorio, is a former public hospital/almshouse in Naples, southern Italy. It was designed by the architect Ferdinando Fuga, and construction began in 1751. It is five storeys tall and approximately 354 m (1,161 ft) long. It was popularly known as "Palazzo Fuga". King Charles III of the House of Bourbon meant the facility to house the destitute and ill, as well as to provide a self-sufficient community where the poor could live, learn trades, and work. The massive Hospice at one time housed over 5000 persons, men and women, in separate wings The building is the centre of Naples, which is included in UNESCO World Heritage List.

The building was originally designed with five courtyards and a church in the centre, entered through the central arch, but only the three innermost courtyards were built, and plans to complete the building according to the original design were finally abandoned in 1819. The Map of the Duke of Noja from 1755, one of the key maps documenting the city of Naples noted for its accuracy — but used also as an urban planning tool, the Hospice is depicted with its projected complete footprint, as a rectangle, 600 meters long and 150 meters wide. As noted, its construction was interrupted in 1819 when the facility had only reached a length of 384 meters.

The structure is no longer a hospital; despite its impressive facade, it has suffered from earthquake damage and general neglect. The central area behind the entrance is used for exhibitions, conferences, and concerts. The façade underwent a restoration in 2006 as part of an as yet ill-defined plan to incorporate the facility into the working infrastructure of public buildings in Naples.
