= Piazza Nicola Amore =

Square in Naples, Italy

- {{{other_names}}}
- Nickname: I quattro palazzi
- Former name: Piazza Agostino Depretis
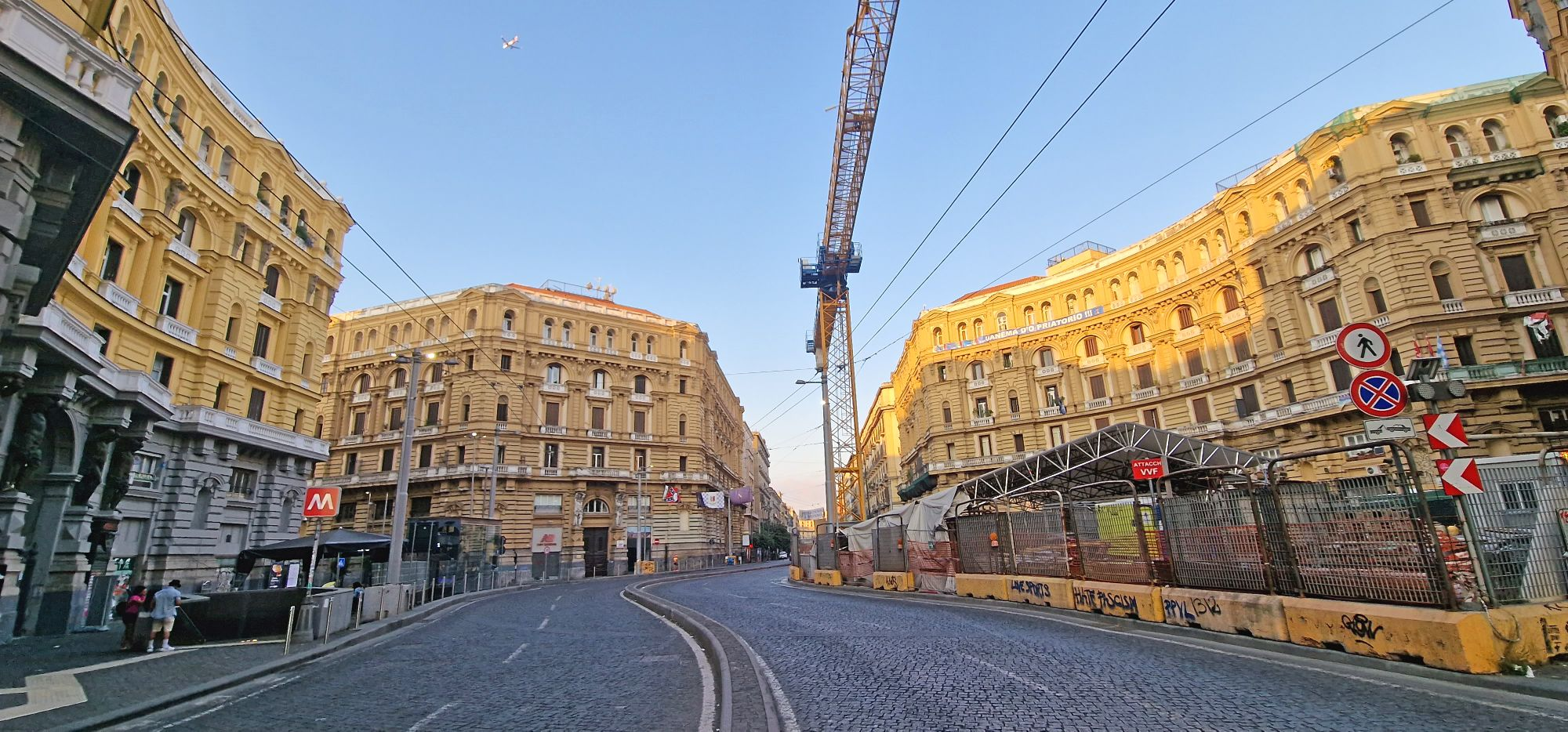
- Dedicated to: Nicola Amore
- Location: Naples, Campania, Italy
- Interactive map of Piazza Nicola Amore

Piazza Nicola Amore (also in Italian: I quattro palazzi, lit. 'The Four Palaces') is a square in Naples, located along Corso Umberto I, in the Historic Centre of Naples, at the intersection with Via Duomo.

Dedicated to Nicola Amore, the mayor who promoted the urban renewal works known as the Risanamento of Naples, it is commonly nicknamed "i quattro palazzi" by locals because of the four identical buildings facing the square.

The square is centrally located between Piazza Giovanni Bovio and Piazza Garibaldi, which stand at the opposite ends of Corso Umberto I.

== History ==
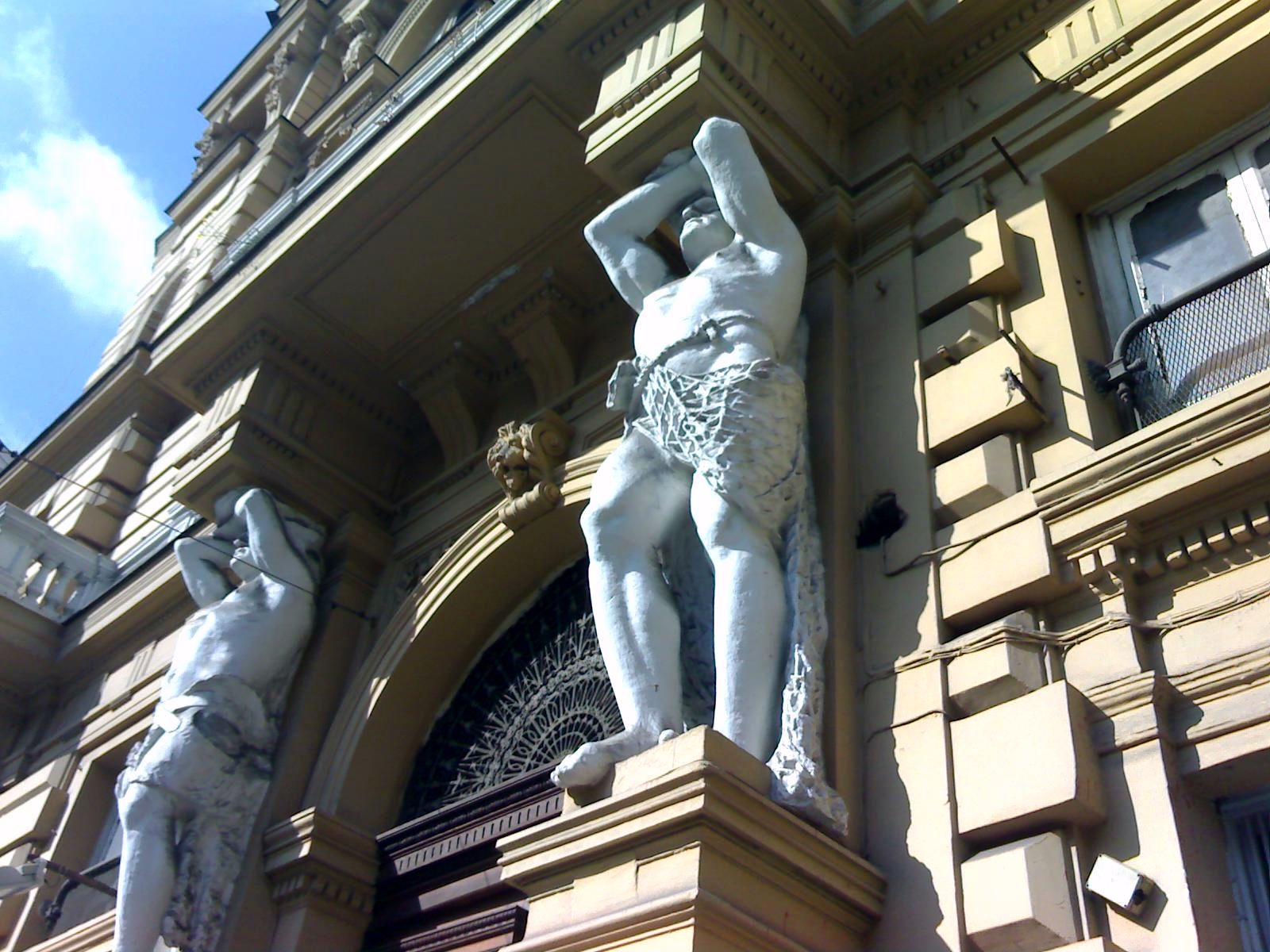
Two of the telamons found on each façade

The square was created with the beginning of the works associated with the Risanamento of Naples, in an area previously occupied by the so-called Piazza della Sellaria or del Pendino, a long and narrow square that contained the Fontana della Sellaria and the sixteenth-century Fountain of Atlas, on which Giovanni da Nola worked.

The original name was Piazza Agostino Depretis, as established in 1891 by the royal commissioner Giuseppe Saredo, but the toponym was later exchanged with that of Via Nicola Amore. In 1894 it was decided to rename the present-day Via Depretis accordingly.

In 1896 the royal commissioner Ottavio Serena resolved that the square should house the Fountain of Neptune, whose location was uncertain at the time, but technical difficulties prevented the resolution from being implemented.

A statue of Mayor Nicola Amore, sculpted by Francesco Jerace, was subsequently erected in the centre of the square and inaugurated on 7 February 1904. From that date the square acquired the name that it still bears today, as did Via Depretis. The statue was later moved to Piazza Vittoria in order to remove any obstacle along the route that Adolf Hitler would travel on 5 May 1938 during his visit to review the Regia Marina in the Gulf of Naples. The monument never returned to the square, and its place was first taken by a revolving ornamental bowl and later by a flowerbed.

On 15 July 1982, Deputy Police Commissioner Antonio Ammaturo and his driver Pasquale Paola were killed in the square shortly after leaving their home. The attack was claimed by the Red Brigades.

In the late 1990s, construction sites for Line 1 of the Naples Metro moved from the city's hilly districts to the lower part of Naples. The square became the site of construction works for Duomo station, which occupied the centre of the square and replaced the flowerbed. The station was inaugurated on 6 August 2021.

== Description ==
The square has a circular plan, reflected in the façades of the four buildings constructed in the Neo-Renaissance style typical of the area's new development and already evident along Via Depretis, continuing throughout Corso Umberto I as far as Piazza Garibaldi.

The buildings are characterized by a massive and monumental architecture which nevertheless gives them a somewhat stocky appearance, a feature shared by many buildings of the period, and makes them appear as single large blocks. Each portal is flanked by two pairs of atlantes that emphasize the grandeur of the structures. The buildings located to the north-west and south-east contain internal courtyards covered by iron-and-glass structures, allowing access from the streets behind them, namely Piazzetta Arcangelo Scacchi and Via Renovella respectively.

== Archaeological discoveries ==
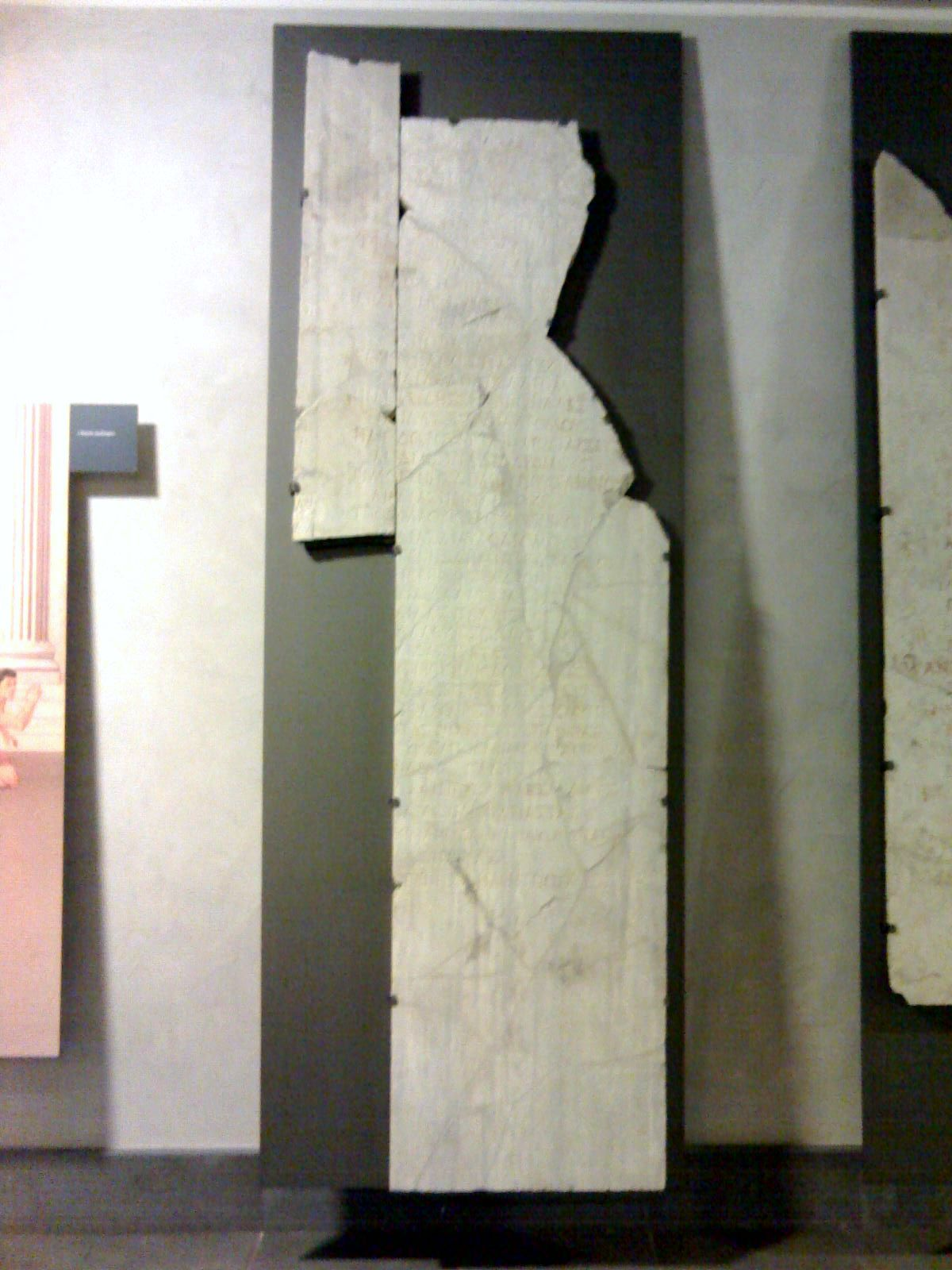
The inscription bearing the names of the victors of the Isolympic Games (now housed in the Stazione Neapolis museum)

As might have been expected, archaeological discoveries soon followed. Located near the harbour, in an area that had been urbanistically active since the Greek and Roman periods, although just outside the ancient city walls, the square concealed remains of exceptional importance to the history of Naples, second only to those discovered in Piazza Municipio. According to ancient historiography, two seaward gates of Neapolis, Porta Baiana and Porta Pizzofalcone, stood only a short distance away. The area continued to develop from the early medieval period onward. During the works of the Risanamento, in 1893, the remains of a thermal complex were discovered, including traces of frescoed rooms. Not far from the square, a headless statue of Nike was found beneath the Church of Sant’Agata degli Orefici, which had been demolished during the construction of the "Rettifilo".

Among the most significant discoveries beneath the square are the remains of a rectangular building dating from the 4th century BC and 3rd century BC, together with a temple from the Imperial Roman period dedicated to the Isolympic Games (or Sebasta), established by Augustus in AD 2 in Naples because the city was regarded as the most Greek city of the Italian peninsula and a guardian of Hellenic culture. The term "Isolympic" means "equal to the Olympic Games". The two structures formed part of a single complex used for the celebration of the games. Within a portico, possibly the gymnasium belonging to the complex, inscriptions listing the victors of the various athletic competitions have been identified.

The archaeological site, of great historical importance, is intended to remain visible to the public not only because it has been incorporated into the station under construction, but also because it is covered by an external glass-and-metal dome designed by architect Massimiliano Fuksas, located near the centre of the square.

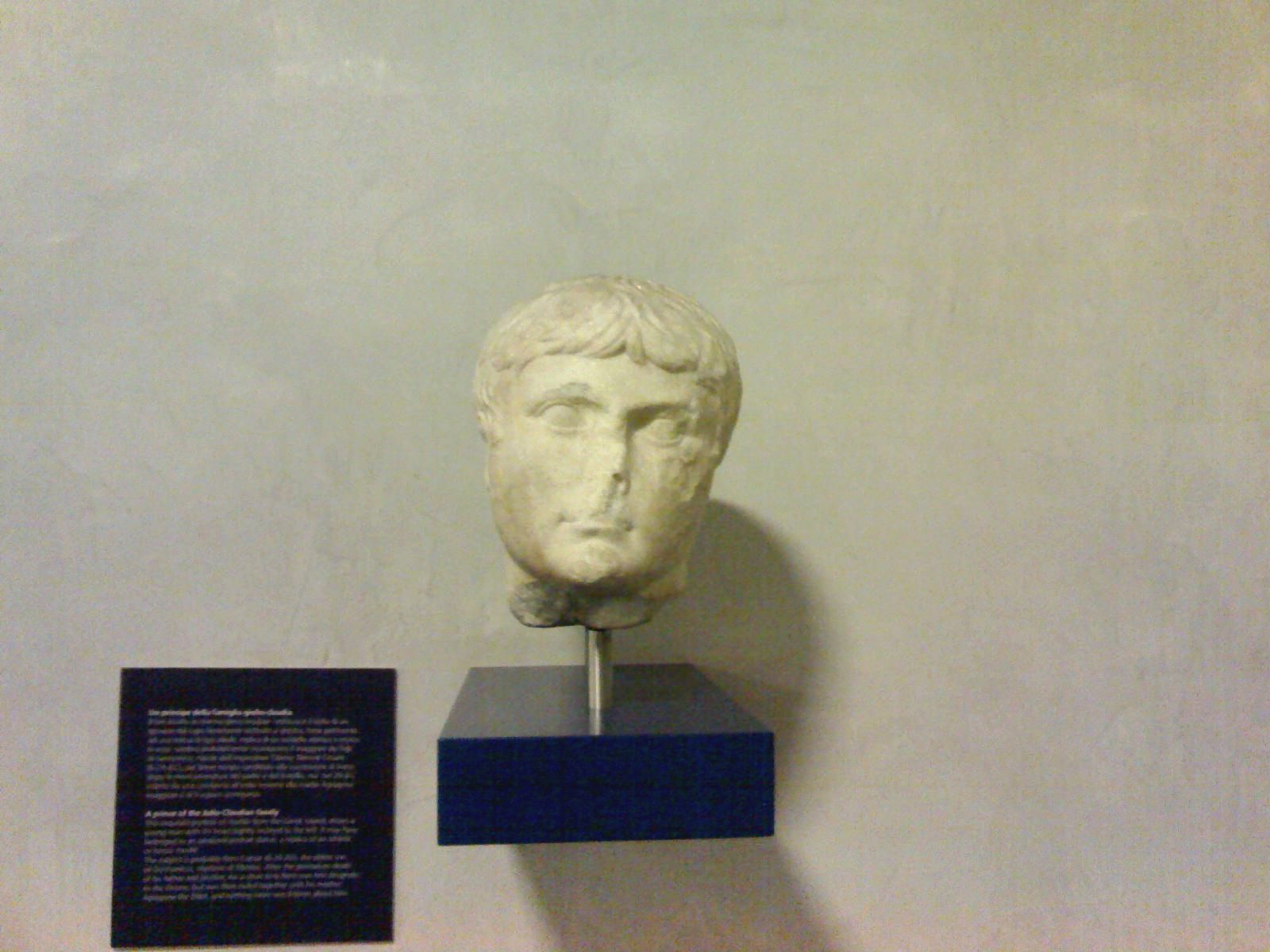
The marble head, now generally identified as Nero Caesar (now housed in the Stazione Neapolis museum)

In addition, several sculptures were unearthed, including a marble head that was initially thought to represent Emperor Nero and was later identified as Germanicus. Subsequent studies have led scholars to conclude that the most likely identification is Nero Caesar, the son of Germanicus and brother of Caligula.

Other finds associated with the temple include statues, marble slabs dating to the second half of the 1st century AD, columns, mosaic floors, and roof simae with waterspouts depicting an eros riding a bull while holding two lions by their manes, beneath which are flayed bucrania. A funerary amphora containing the skeleton of a child was also discovered, together with various inscribed amphora fragments and votive materials.

Finally, a medieval fountain dating to the 13th century was brought to light. On one side of the structure, drawings were identified depicting a watchtower and a procession of galleys, most likely military vessels returning from a battle. A scale model of the fountain was subsequently produced.

All of these discoveries significantly slowed the construction of the station. As a result, traffic circulation around the square was radically altered. The placement of Fuksas’s external structure, still being completed, led to the removal of the original roundabout and the pedestrianization of part of the square on the inland side, as well as the section of Via Duomo between the square and Via Zecca dei Panni/Via Tramontano. The upper section of Via Duomo consequently became accessible only via Via Seggio del Popolo and Via dei Cimbri. Traffic along Corso Umberto I is now maintained through a chicane crossing the square, intersecting with Via Duomo only on the seaward side and only in the direction of Piazza Garibaldi.

The artefacts recovered during these excavations, together with the model of the fountain, are now on display at the Stazione Neapolis museum complex within Line 1 of the Naples Metro. The structural remains of the site are currently undergoing restoration prior to being opened to the public.
