= Via Mezzocannone =

Street in Naples, Italy

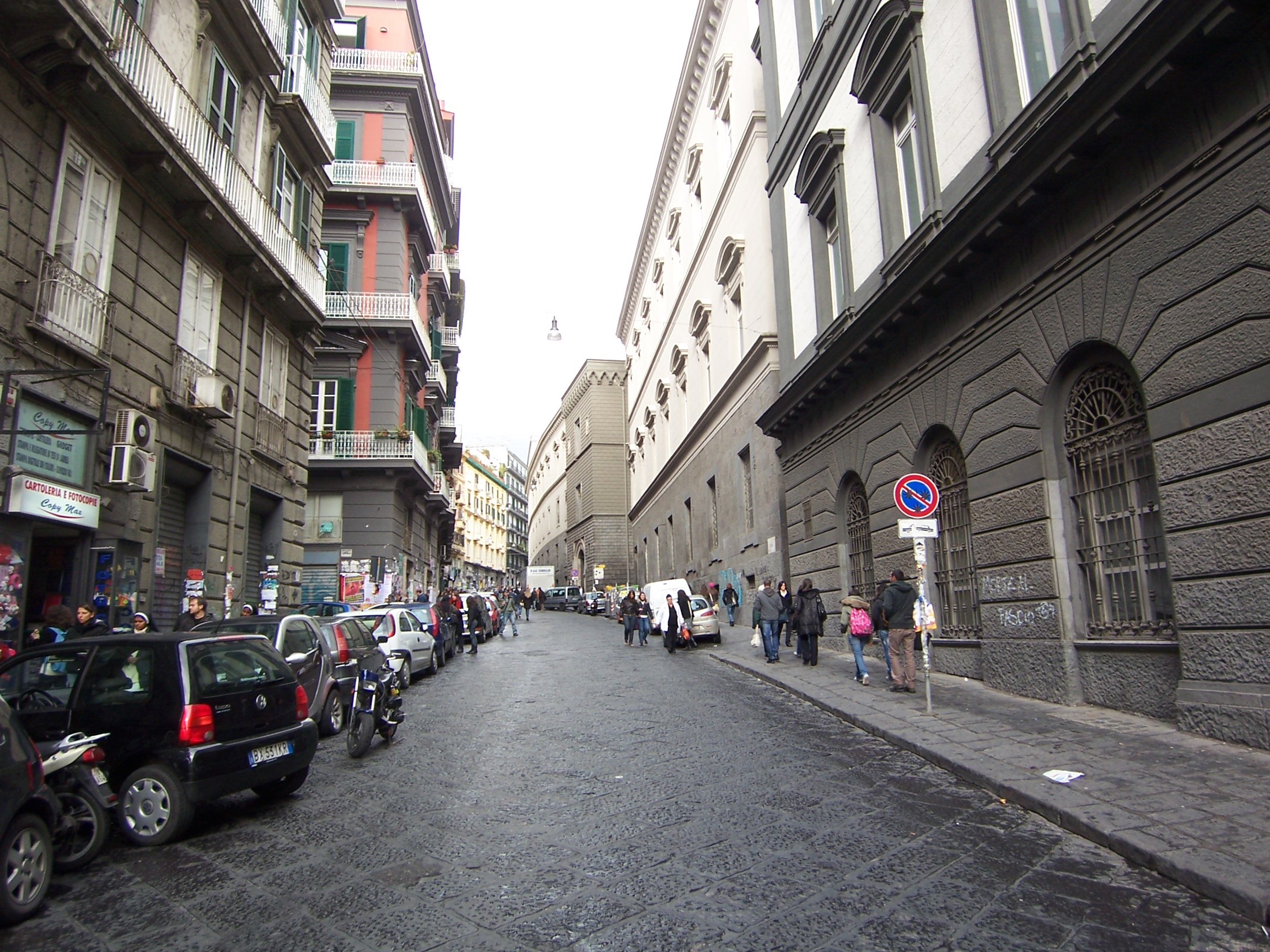
- A view of via Mezzocannone.
- Interactive map of Via Mezzocannone
- Part of: University of Naples Federico II; University Library of Naples
- Location: Porto, Naples Municipality II
- Postal code: 80134

Via Mezzocannone is a street in Naples which, in the district of Porto, connects Piazzetta Nilo and Piazza San Domenico to Corso Umberto I. It is about 450 metres long.

== Etymology ==
The name derives from a fountain located roughly halfway along its length (near via Sedile di Porto), commissioned in the 15th century by Alfonso II, King of Naples and Duke of Calabria.

This fountain, made of piperno and set against the wall for watering horses, had an extremely short spout (in Neapolitan, cannola or cannone, hence mezzo, "half"), and depicted a royal figure in an awkward pose, so much so that "'o Rre 'e Miezocannone" ("the King of Mezzocannone") became a byword for a ridiculous bearing or particular clumsiness, probably meant to represent Alfonso II himself. The fountain was dismantled when the street was widened, and its remains, kept in a municipal storehouse, were later lost.

Part of it was rediscovered in the 1970s by Giancarlo Alisio in an antique dealer's shop: a square marble inlay bearing an inscription dedicated to Alfonso II, and a Medusa head from which the mezzocannone spout would have emerged, similar to another fountain, the now-lost Fontana dei Serpi, on the vanished via del Pendino.

Another proposed etymology traces the name to a unit of measurement for the fountain's water flow. At the time, the canna and the cannone were units used to measure water flow, and the fountain is said to have had a flow of mezzo cannone ("half a cannone").

== History ==
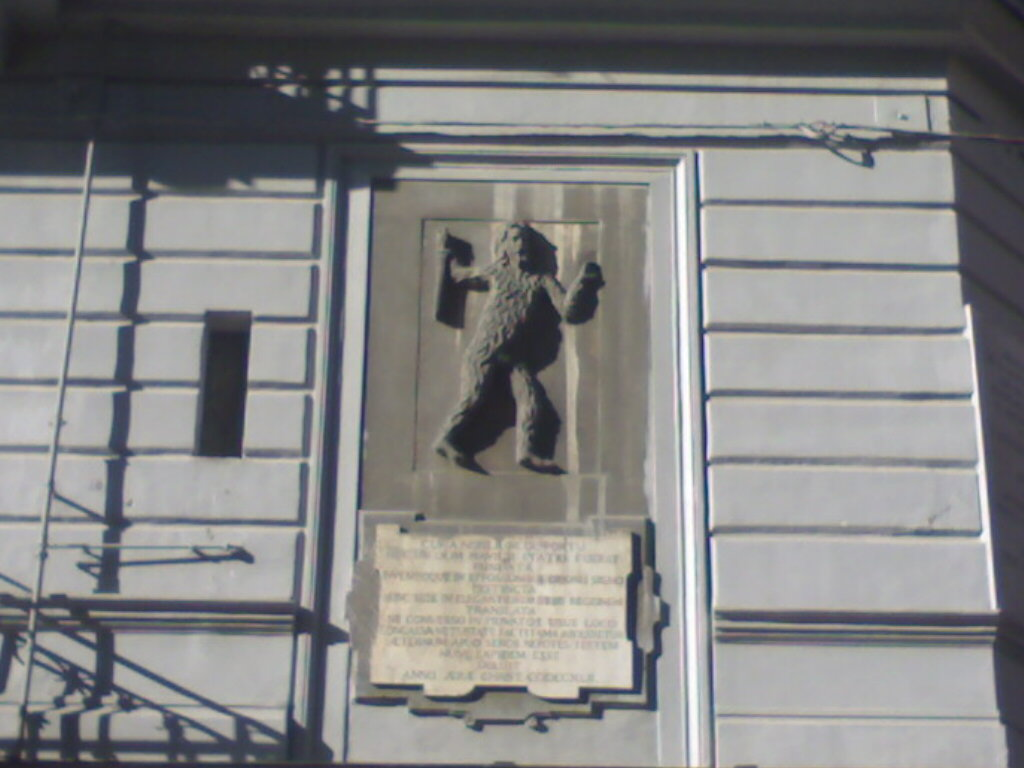
The "hairy man" of via Mezzocannone.

Via Mezzocannone runs along the western edge of the Greek city of Neapolis. The city soon grew past this line, which became a path, and several religious orders settled on its eastern side. The street's original course partly followed the ancient ravine that had formed between two of the city's walls near the so-called Porta Ventosa or Licinia. Before the Risanamento, the street, then much narrower, was home to dyers who, working in their shops, let their dye mixtures run down toward the bottom of the street, making it nearly impassable. Salvatore Di Giacomo described the "budello di Mezzocannone" ("Mezzocannone gut") as "a filthy Neapolitan intestine".

Near what, before the Risanamento works, was called Vicolo Mezzocannone (as if bearing witness to the narrowness and decay typical of the street) stood the famous fountain of the same name.

Already in the Angevin period, moreover, numerous noble palaces, surrounded by gardens and fountains, had been built around the street. In particular, on the right-hand side of the street, at the start of the Rampe of the Church of San Giovanni Maggiore (which still exists today), stood the Palazzo di Fabrizio Colonna, dating from the 15th century.

Following the Risanamento, the street was widened to connect the decumanus inferior (and thus the entire upper part of the city) with the reclaimed areas.

In the central part of the street, all the buildings were demolished to make way, on the right-hand side, for university buildings, and, on the left-hand side, for the widening of the street and the construction of residential buildings. The new university was designed by Pier Paolo Quaglia and Guglielmo Melisurgo, whose plan gave it a new front on via Mezzocannone and kept the old one on via Giovanni Paladino. The work was interrupted by the First World War and slowed by economic crises, and it ended only in 1934. Since then the university buildings have formed almost the whole eastern side of the street. Within these new Umbertine-era buildings, however, some traces of the earlier structures survive: the bas-relief of Orion, symbol of the old Porto Sedile, popularly known as Niccolò Pesce, on one of the buildings on the left; and the portal of Palazzo Colonna, reused for the entrance of the university building at no. 8, on the right-hand side of the street.

At the end of via Mezzocannone, near Piazzetta Nilo, the convents of Gesù Vecchio and Donnaromita survived the Risanamento, only to be demolished later to widen the final stretch of the street as part of a broader renovation of the university buildings; likewise, a bay of the eighteenth-century Palazzo di Sangro di Casacalenda was cut away, erasing what remained of the church of Santa Maria della Rotonda, on which the palace had been built. Also on the right-hand side of the street stands a large masonry structure corresponding to the former Church of San Girolamo delle Monache, destroyed by bombing during the World War II.

The universities
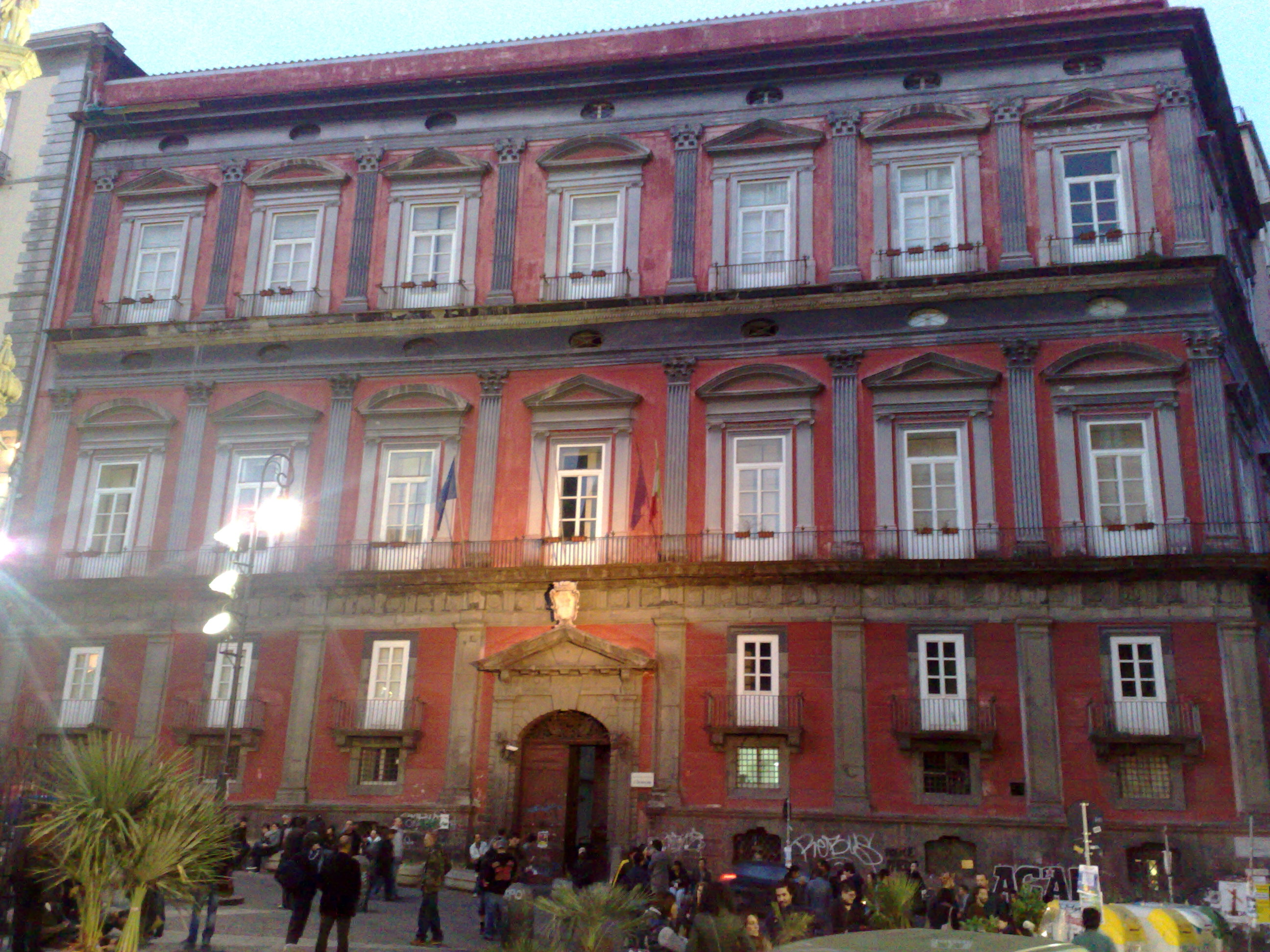
Palazzo Saluzzo di Corigliano (seat of the L'Orientale university).

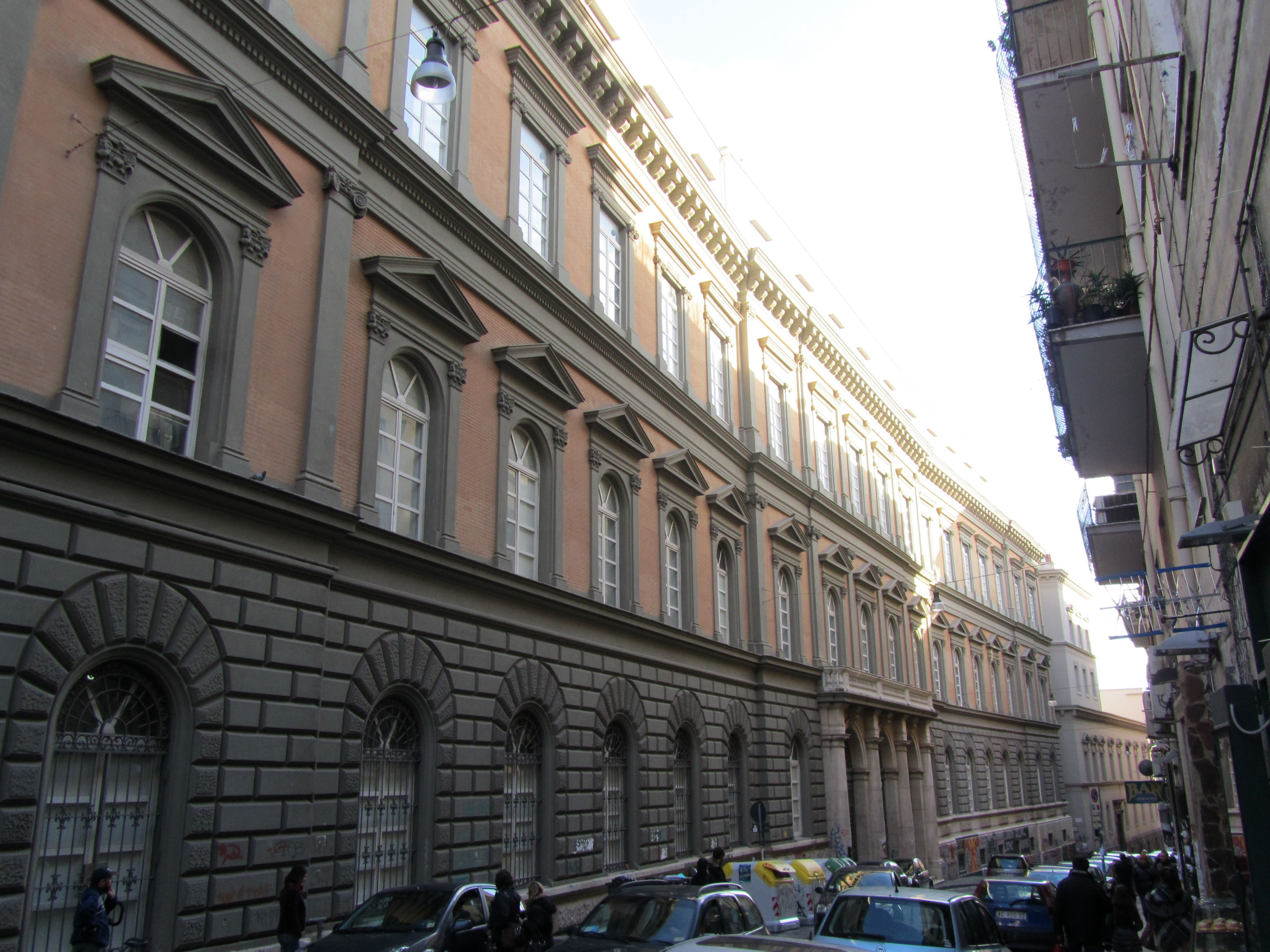
Building of the Federico II University's Biotechnology department.

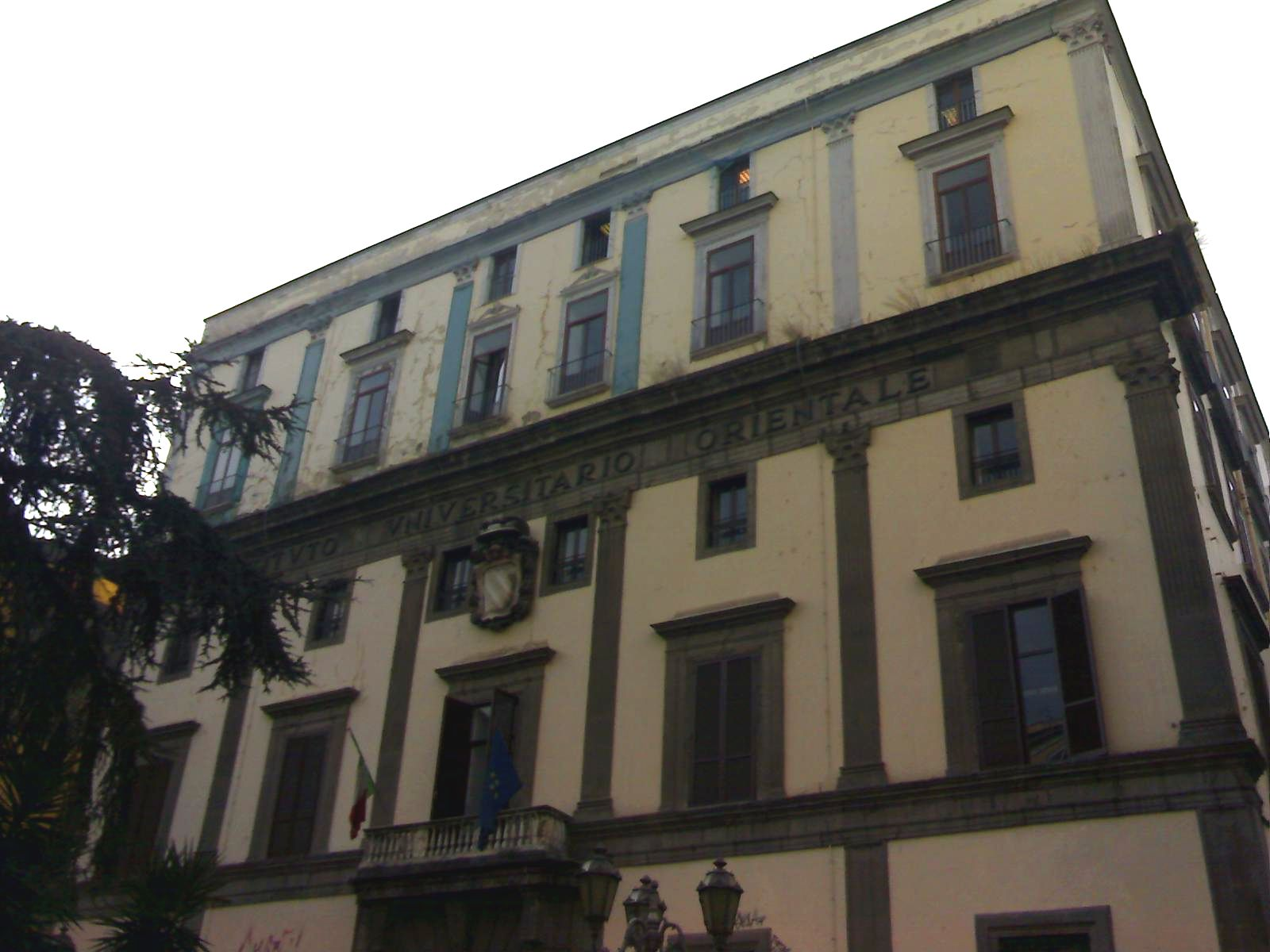
Palazzo Giusso (another seat of the L'Orientale university).

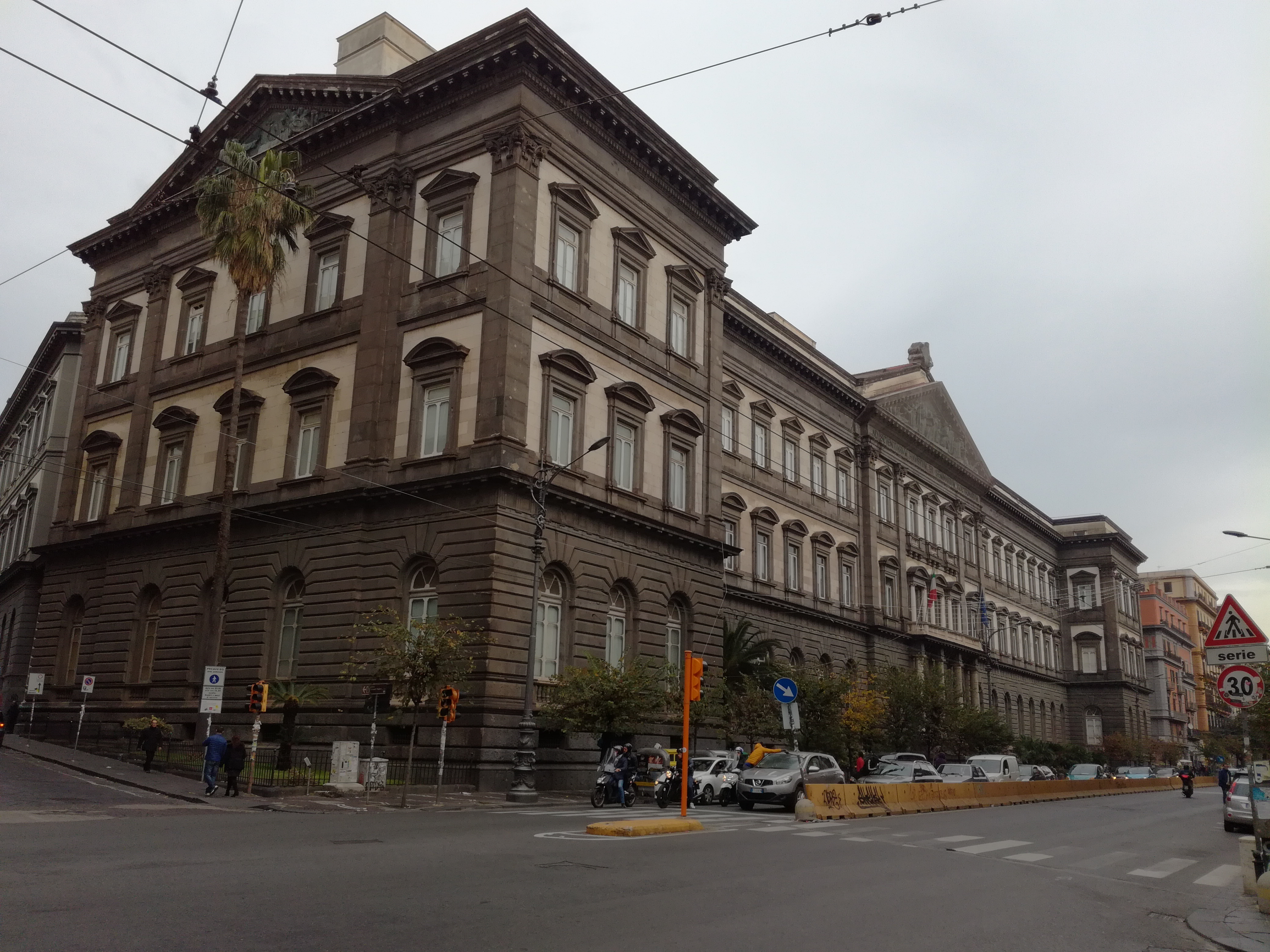
Building of the Federico II University's Law and Humanities departments.

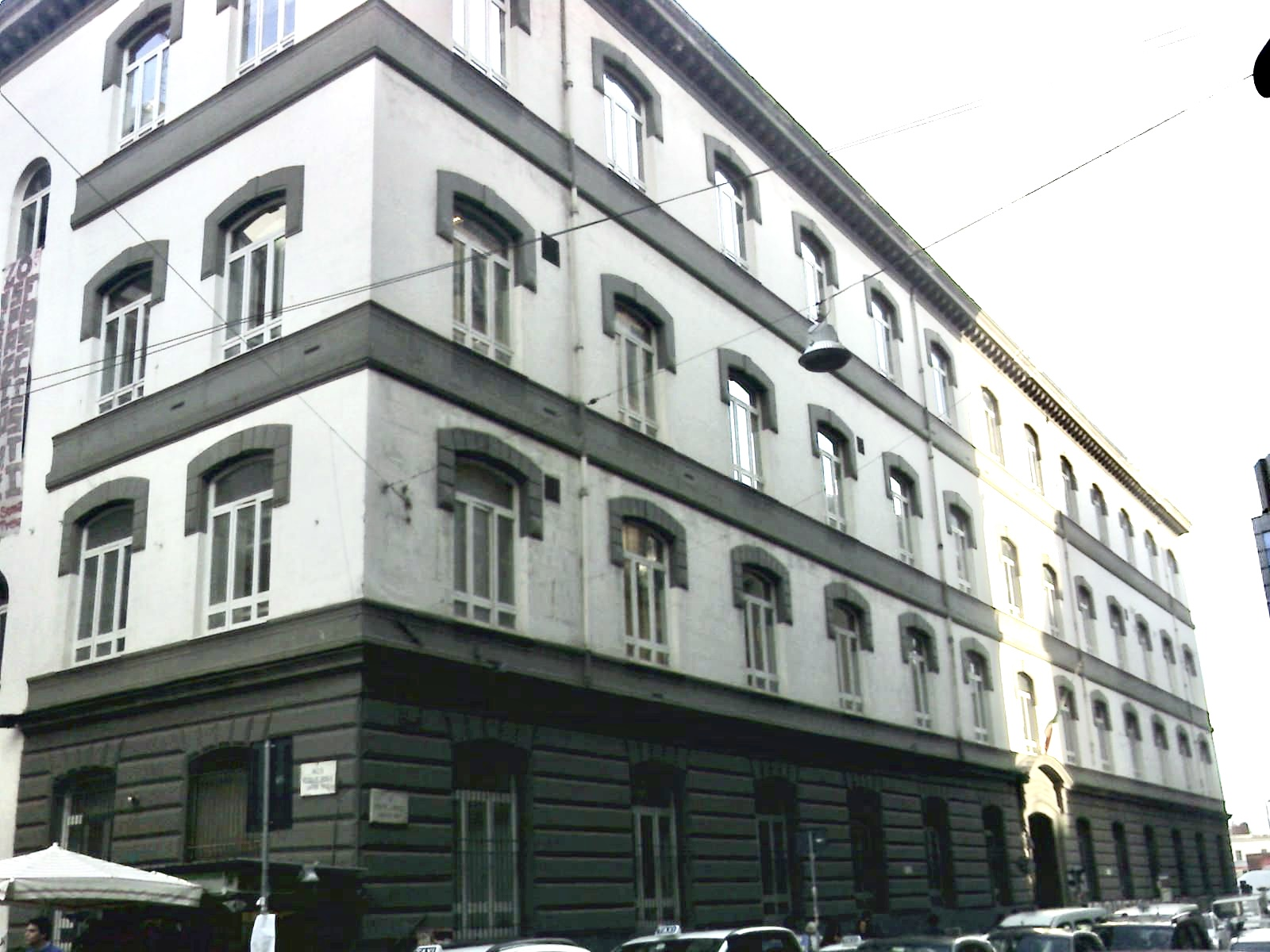
Building of the Federico II University's Humanities department.

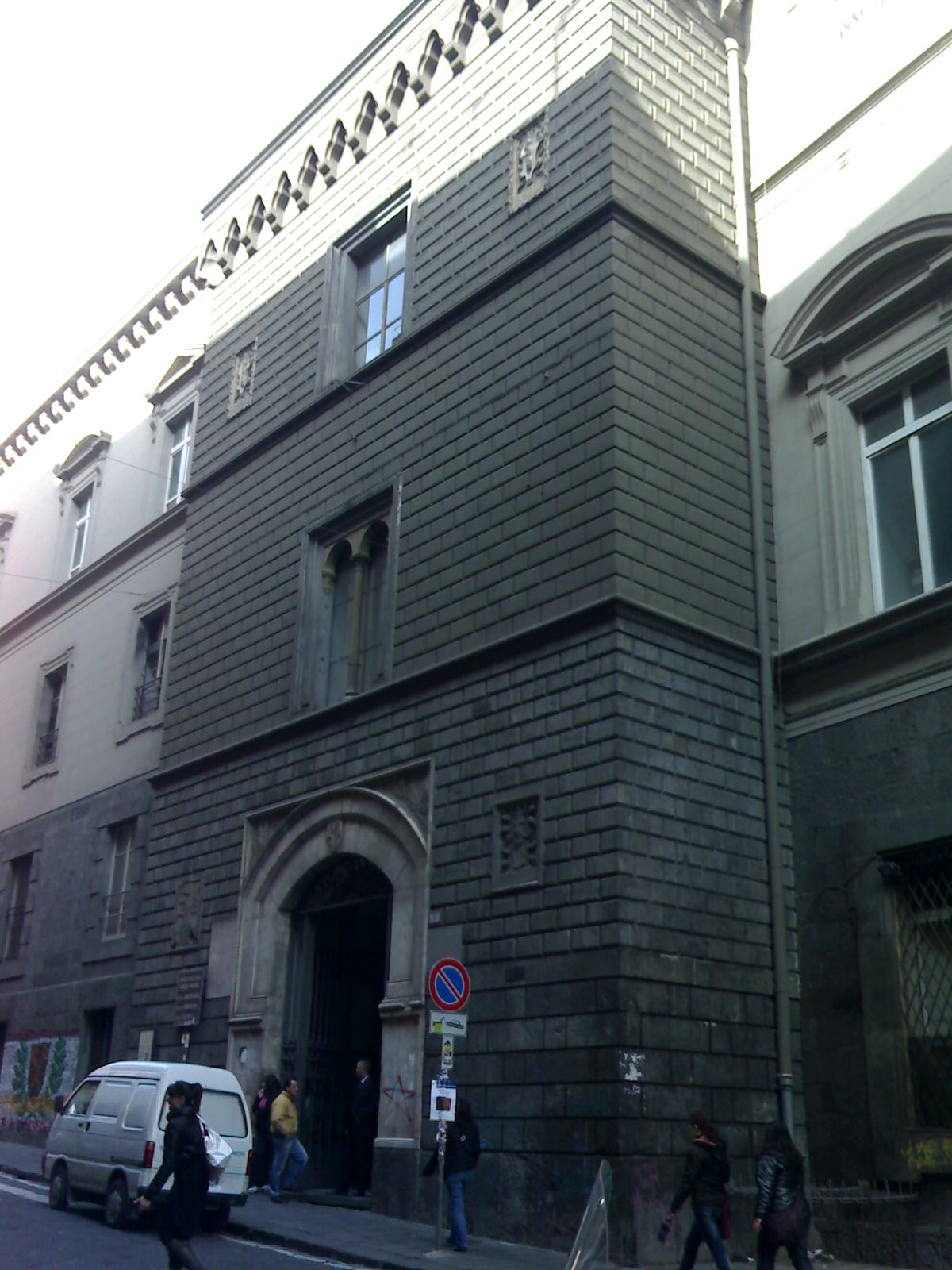
Building of the Mineralogy Museum (satellite site of the Biotechnology department).

== Via Mezzocannone today ==
With the construction of the large new university buildings, via Mezzocannone has become the centre of university, and more broadly student, life in the capital of Campania. It is home to the first university of Naples, which houses historic museums of biological and natural sciences and, above all, the State University Library, which holds more than 1,200,000 volumes and around 18,000 periodicals.

Today, all of the street's activity revolves around the university, with the street lined by bookshops, print shops, and historic publishing houses such as "De Frede", founded in the late nineteenth century, as well as copy shops, stationery stores, bars, and distinctive venues (on the side street "Rampe San Giovanni Maggiore", for instance, the venue "La Chitarra", opened in 1991 by Neapolitan singer and guitarist Egisto Sarnelli, is still there today).
