= Corso Umberto I =

Street in Naples, Italy

- Rettifilo
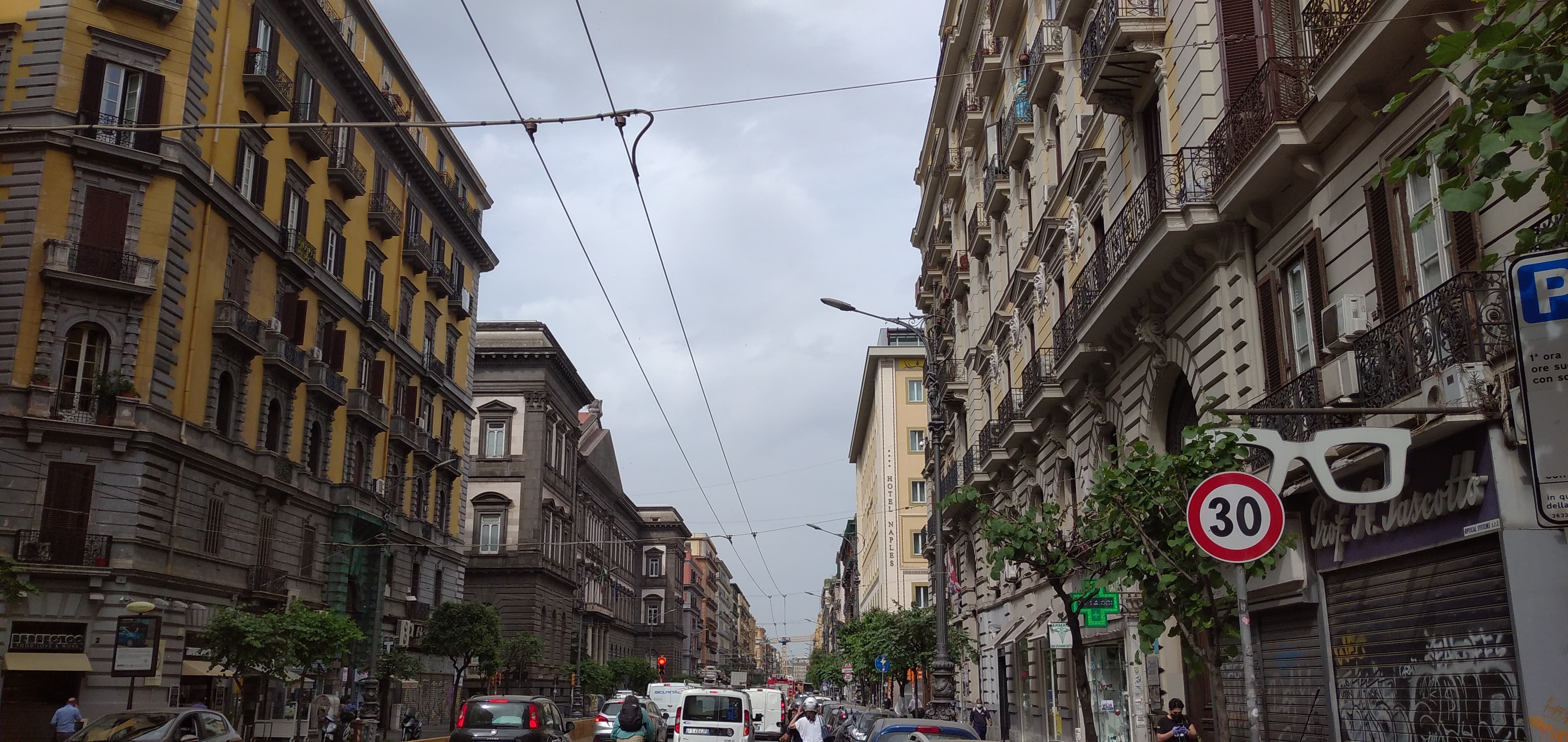
- Corso Umberto I towards Piazza Nicola Amore
- Interactive map of Corso Umberto I
- Length: 1.3 km (0.81 mi)
- Location: Naples, Italy
- Quarter: Historic Centre of Naples
- Postal code: 80138
- From: Piazza Giovanni Bovio
- To: Piazza Garibaldi

Corso Umberto I (also known as the Rettifilo) is one of the most recent historic streets in Naples, Italy. At 1.3 kilometres (0.81 mi) in length, it is a major thoroughfare connecting the city centre with Napoli Centrale railway station.

The street begins at Piazza Giovanni Bovio (formerly Piazza della Borsa) and runs in a straight line to Piazza Garibaldi, the location of Napoli Centrale railway station (formerly known as Piazza della Ferrovia), passing through Piazza Nicola Amore, named after the mayor Nicola Amore, who was one of the principal figures behind the Risanamento.

== History ==
The street was laid out during the Umbertine era as part of the Risanamento, a large-scale urban renewal project that involved the demolition of entire neighbourhoods and numerous buildings, including structures of significant artistic and religious value, in order to make way for modern apartment blocks. Many of these buildings were constructed using tuff quarried from Soccavo, Pianura, Chiaiano, and Miano.

The redevelopment followed the cholera epidemic that had killed thousands of residents. Contemporary opinion often attributed the spread of the disease to the city's previous urban layout, characterised by narrow, poorly ventilated streets and overcrowded tenement buildings lacking basic services, where large numbers of people lived in small apartments.

The avenue was constructed rapidly in the late 19th century according to the architectural styles of the period and was opened in 1894. In 1897 the city council established that it should be named Corso Re d'Italia, in accordance with a decree issued in 1891 by royal commissioner Giuseppe Saredo, which regulated the city’s new street names. The name was later changed in honour of Umberto I of Italy, who had remained in Naples during the cholera epidemic and became known as the Good King for his assistance to the sick and dying.

According to many critics, the avenue, intended to symbolise the new post-Italian unification and Savoyard Naples, ultimately became a symbol of the contradictions of the Risanamento. While presenting elegant new façades, it left many of the city's poorest quarters intact behind them and resulted in the destruction of a large number of historic buildings of considerable artistic value.

== Description ==
After Piazza Bovio, the first major building along the street is the Church of San Pietro Martire, originally built during the Angevin period and later remodelled in the Baroque style. The church stands in Piazza Ruggiero Bonghi, where a statue of Ruggiero Bonghi, sculpted by Enrico Mossuti in 1900, is also located. At this point Corso Umberto I intersects with Via Mezzocannone, the main university street.

Further along, on the left side of the avenue, stands the University of Naples Federico II, whose main building features an eclectic façade.

Continuing eastward, the Borgo Orefici quarteropens on the right. The area is known for its goldsmith workshops and is characterised by a dense network of streets descending towards Via Marina.

At the intersection with Via Duomo, the avenue passes through Piazza Nicola Amore, the only large square along its route. Beyond the square, the Sant'Agostino alla Zecca church and the quarter of Forcella lie to the left, while the area of Piazza Mercato extends to the right.

Also on the left side of the street is the Santa Maria Egiziaca a Forcella church, near the Basilica della Santissima Annunziata Maggiore and its historic hospital complex.

Before reaching Piazza Garibaldi, one of the entrances to the San Pietro ad Aram basilica is located on the left side of the avenue.

== Bibliography ==
- Marrone, Romualdo. Le strade di Napoli. Rome: Newton Compton, 2004.
