= Borgo Orefici =

- Neighbourhood
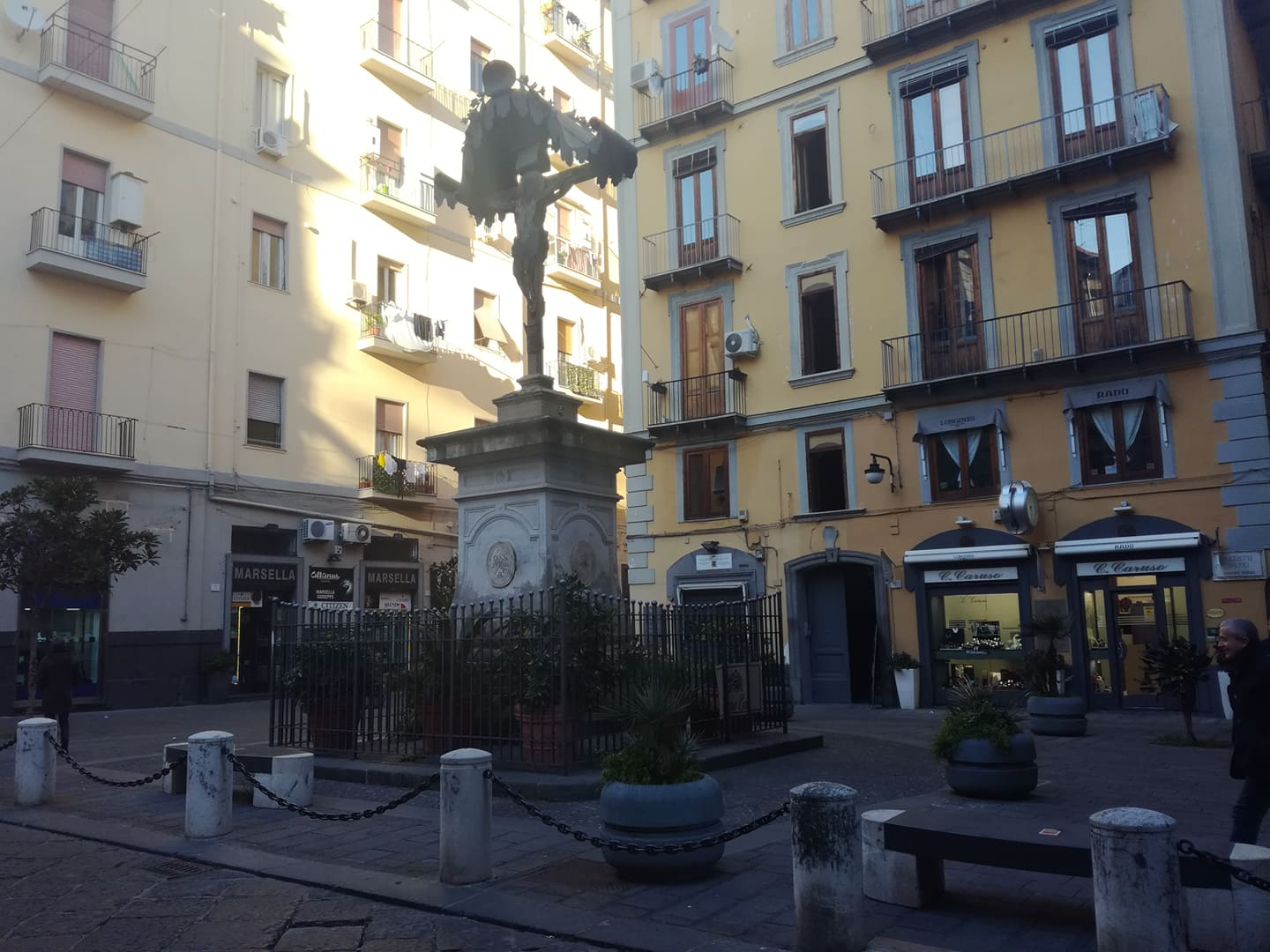
- The crucifix at Borgo Orefici
- Interactive map of Borgo Orefici
- Country: Italy
- Region: Campania
- Metropolitan city: Naples
- City: Naples
- Circoscrizione: 2nd municipality
- Quarter: Pendino

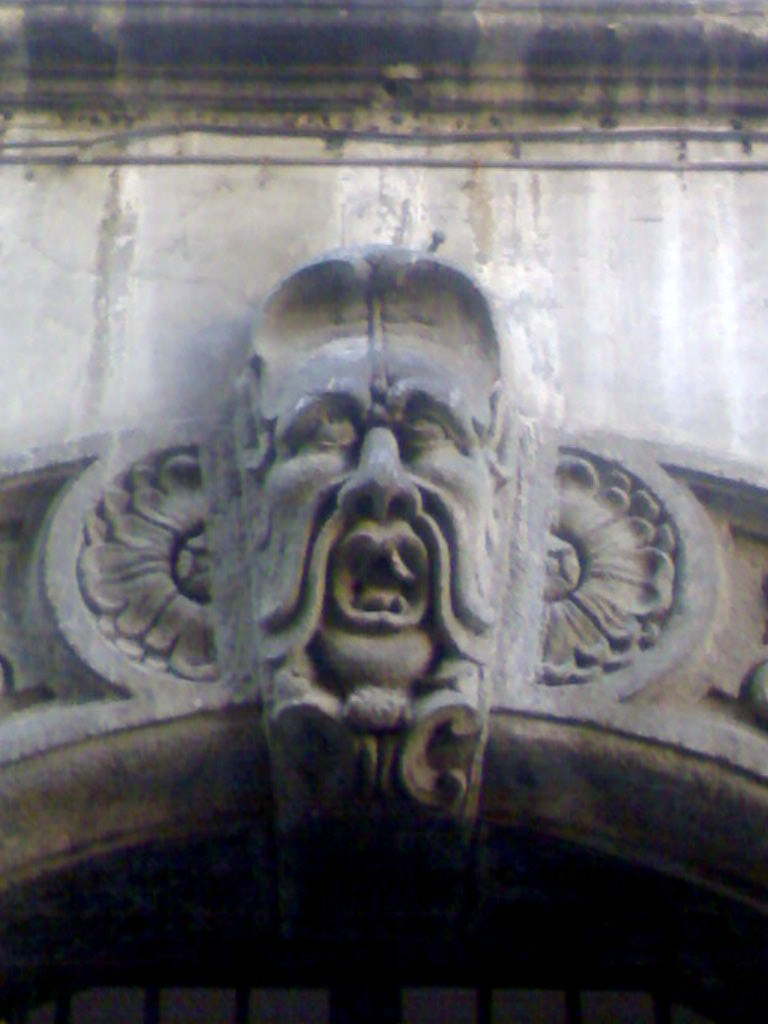
Detail of one of the palaces of the borgo

The Borgo Orefici is a historic neighborhood in Naples, Italy, falling within the quarter of Pendino.

== Extent ==
It lies close to the sea, between via Nuova Marina and the Rettifilo (Corso Umberto I), laid out in a maze-like pattern of narrow lanes around the central hub of Piazzetta Orefici. The neighborhood is home to the oldest and most important workshops in the city specializing in the craftsmanship of gold work, silverware, and jewellery.

== History ==
=== Middle Ages ===
The first firm evidence of the area's distinctive character dates back to the Middle Ages, when the workshops, already numerous, received official recognition from Joanna I of Naples and formed themselves into a guild.

The earliest goldsmith masters were Frenchmen who had come to Naples in the retinue of the Angevins; they were soon joined by local craftsmen, who quickly came to supplant the French masters and succeeded in creating a Neapolitan tradition and school known throughout Europe until the fall of the Kingdom of Naples.

=== Kingdom of Naples ===
Later, toward the end of the 17th century, Gaspar Méndez de Haro, 7th Marquess of Carpio, Viceroy of Naples, established that the crafts of silversmith and goldsmith could be practised only within the area of the borgo, effectively creating a monopoly in favour of the guild, which has since evolved into a consortium joined by nearly all of the city's goldsmiths.

=== Unification of Italy ===
Between 1890 and 1903 the borgo underwent urban redevelopment as part of the Risanamento of Naples, which altered its layout. Many alleys and buildings, both secular and religious, were demolished to make way for wider streets (as in the case of the present-day via Saverio Baldacchini).

== Notable works ==
It was here that the celebrated statues of the Treasure of Saint Januarius were cast, worked, and completed, along with the sacred furnishings of many other Neapolitan churches.
