= Via Duomo =

Street in Naples, Italy

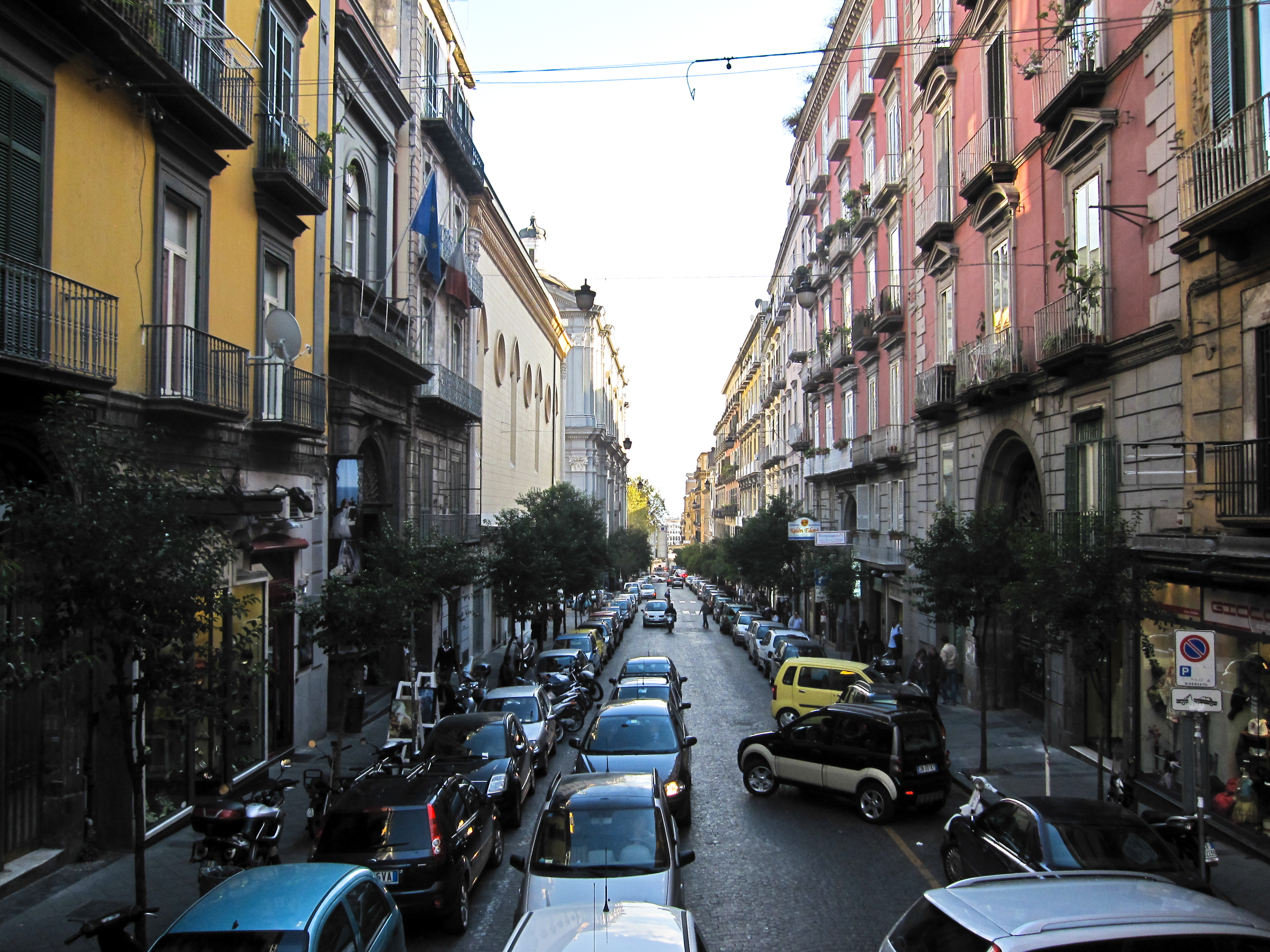
- Interactive map of Via Duomo
- Length: 1,200 m (3,900 ft)
- Location: Naples, Italy
- Quarter: Historic Centre of Naples (San Lorenzo and Pendino)
- Postal code: 80138 (odd numbers 1–291 and even numbers 2–302); 80133 (odd numbers 293–347 and even numbers 304–350)

Via Duomo is a street in the Historic Centre of Naples, approximately 1,200 metres long, running from its junction with Via Marina to Via Foria, crossing Corso Umberto I at Piazza Nicola Amore. The street takes its name from the Naples Cathedral, in Italian: Duomo di Napoli.

== History ==
Via Duomo corresponds to the cardo maior, the longest and most important of the ancient cardines of the city. For this reason, it intersects the three principal decumani: the Decumanus Maximus, the upper decumanus (Via dell'Anticaglia), and the lower decumanus (Spaccanapoli).

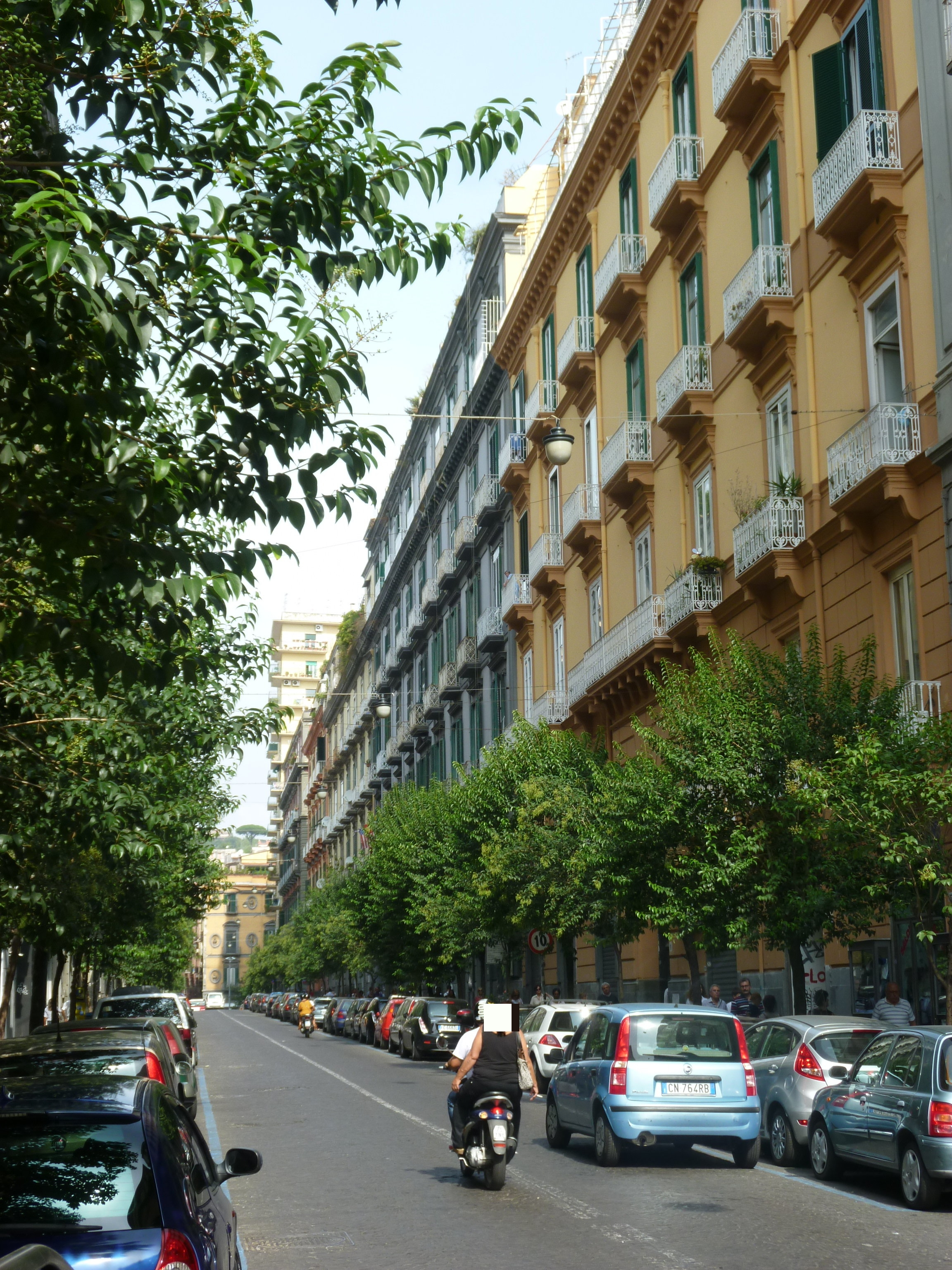
The street towards Via Foria

The street did not always have its present dimensions. Prior to its widening, it was a narrow lane similar to many others in the city and was known as Vico del Tarì or Vico del Pozzo Bianco as far as the upper decumanus, and from there to the cathedral as Vico Gurgite. During the Middle Ages it was known as Vicus Radii Solis ("Street of the Sunbeam"), in reference to the Temple of Apollo once located beneath the Basilica di Santa Restituta.

Only during the Bourbon period was the widening of the ancient cardo planned in order to create a direct north-south connection between Via Foria and Via Marina. In 1853, Ferdinand II of the Two Sicilies approved the route proposed by Luigi Cangiano and Antonio Francesconi, while introducing substantial modifications to an earlier project drafted in 1839 by Federico Bausan and Luigi Giordano, which would have routed the street behind the cathedral.

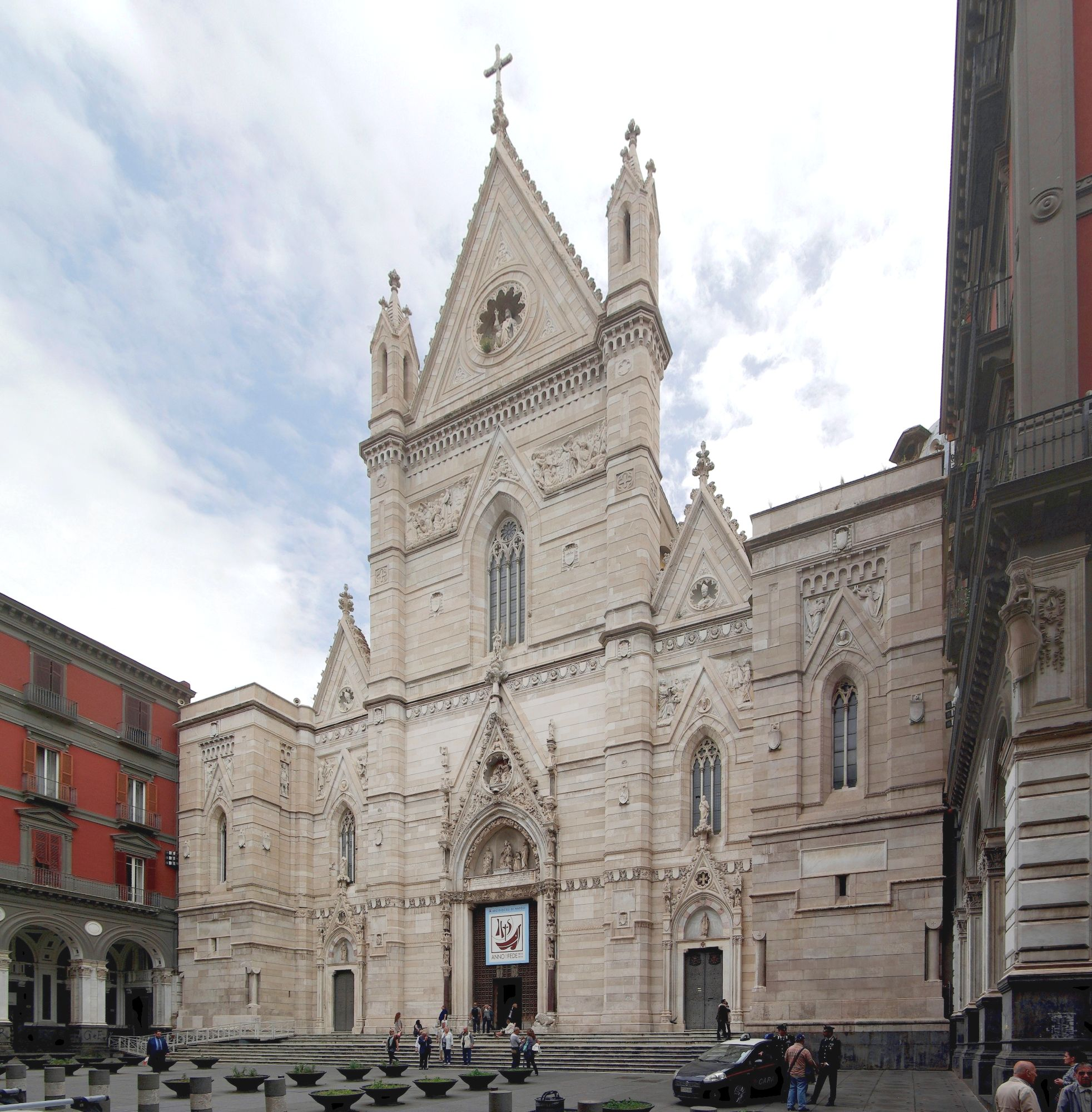
The Naples Cathedral, from which the street takes its name

In 1860, Francis II of the Two Sicilies ordered that the street, widened to sixty palms in width, should reach the archbishop's palace and entrusted the project to Cangiano and Francesconi. Political developments, however, prevented immediate execution. The 1853 plan was subsequently confirmed by Giuseppe Garibaldi in the building decree he issued on 18 October 1860. The project called for the widening of one of the cardines of the ancient Greek street grid while preserving much of the existing architecture on the eastern side, including courtyards, staircases and entrance halls that still survive today.

Construction contracts were finally awarded in March 1861, and work began in June of that year. The section as far as the archbishop's palace was completed in 1868. The extension to Via San Biagio dei Librai and Via Vicaria Vecchia followed in 1870, while the connection to the waterfront was not completed until 1880, after part of the Church of San Giorgio Maggiore had been demolished and its façade rebuilt. The completion of the surrounding buildings later formed part of the Risanamento of Naples.

For a brief period after the end of World War I, the street was renamed in honour of US President Woodrow Wilson.

During the administration of Mayor Rosa Russo Iervolino, the street underwent renovation works involving new paving, sidewalks and street furniture. One-way traffic was also introduced from Via San Biagio dei Librai towards Via Foria.

Between September 2011 and the summer of 2013, the section of the street in front of the cathedral was closed to private traffic and converted into a reserved lane for public transport and residents. A year later, an electronic restricted traffic zone checkpoint was activated near Piazza Museo Filangieri. These measures were intended to reduce automobile traffic and improve the street's role as a major tourist route.

In 2019, a major redevelopment project financed by European funds began on the section between Via San Biagio dei Librai and Via Foria. The works widened the sidewalks, narrowed the roadway and replaced the existing porphyry paving stones with lava stone slabs. The project was completed at the end of 2020. In 2025, a similar redevelopment scheme was undertaken on the section between Via San Biagio dei Librai and Piazza Museo Filangieri, where construction work connected with the completion of the external structures of Duomo metro station on Line 1 was still underway.

== Description ==
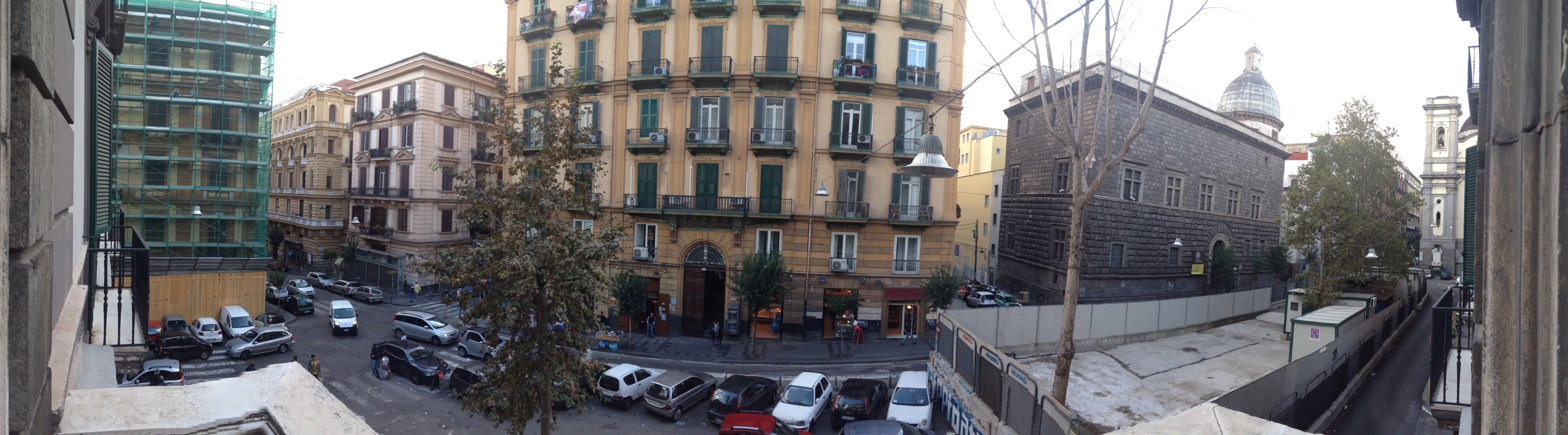
Piazza Museo Filangieri. On the right is Palazzo Como.

The street may be followed northwards from the harbour area near Molo Carlo Pisacane, where it begins at its junction with Via Nuova Marina.

Along its route stand numerous historic palaces, many formerly owned by noble families whose histories are closely connected with Naples. At Piazza Nicola Amore is the metro station designed by architect Massimiliano Fuksas. Further along, at Piazza Museo Filangieri, stand Palazzo De Bellis and historic Palazzo Como, home to the Museo Civico Filangieri. Among the most important churches are San Severo al Pendino and San Giorgio Maggiore, which preserves significant architectural elements of the earlier basilica on whose foundations it was built.

Continuing uphill, the street intersects Spaccanapoli at the junction of Via Duomo, Via San Biagio dei Librai and Via Vicaria Vecchia. At this crossroads stands the Church of the Crocelle ai Mannesi, formally dedicated to Saint Francis of Assisi. Further north, Via Duomo crosses Via dei Tribunali, the route of the ancient Decumanus Maximus, with the streets of the Greek-Roman city extending to the west and the later urban expansion beyond the ancient walls to the east.

One of the most important landmarks on the street is the Naples Cathedral, which incorporates the Basilica di Santa Restituta and the Royal Chapel of the Treasure of Saint Januarius. The cathedral is set back from the street on a small square known as Piazzetta della Guglia del Duomo. Opposite stands the Hieronymites, whose cloister houses the renowned Quadreria dei Girolamini. At number 152 stands the monumental Palazzo Miradois, whose vestibule incorporates the vaults of the medieval Church of San Stefanello and from whose courtyard an elegant Baroque staircase can be seen. Further north, near the intersection with the upper decumanus (Via Anticaglia, Via San Giuseppe dei Ruffi and Via Donnaregina), visitors can reach the Diocesan Museum of Naples housed within Santa Maria Donnaregina Nuova and the Archbishop's Palace of Naples. At number 45 is the house where poet Libero Bovio lived and died. Since 1992 a commemorative plaque has marked the building.

Via Duomo ends at Via Foria, from which Piazza Cavour can be reached directly. Today the street is lined with shops and businesses. It is particularly noted for its bridal ateliers, which continue Naples' long tailoring tradition.

== Historic and architectural landmarks ==
- Duomo metro station, designed by Massimiliano Fuksas
- The "Four Palaces" of Piazza Nicola Amore
- Palazzo della Grande Loggia
- Palazzo Como, home to the Museo Civico Filangieri
- Palazzo De Bellis
- Palazzo Dentice d'Accadia
- San Severo al Pendino
- San Giorgio Maggiore
- Church of the Crocelle ai Mannesi
- Palazzo di Santa Maria di Porta Coeli
- Naples Cathedral
- Santa Restituta
- Royal Chapel of the Treasure of Saint Januarius
- Quadreria dei Girolamini
- Palazzo Miradois
- San Giuseppe dei Ruffi
- House of Libero Bovio

== Bibliography ==
- Romualdo Marrone, Le strade di Napoli. Rome: Newton Compton Editori, 2004.
