= 2nd municipality of Naples =

Second Municipality of Naples Municipalità 2 Seconda Municipalità
- Borough
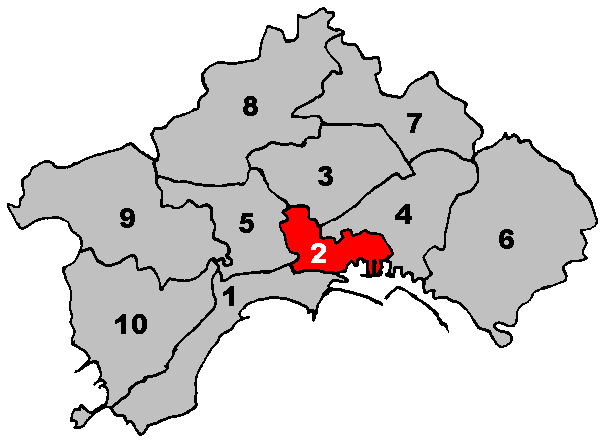
- Location within Naples
- Coordinates: 40°50′57.92″N 14°14′59″E
- Country: Italy
- Municipality: Naples
- Established: 2005
- Seat: Piazza Dante, 93

Government
  - President: Francesco Chirico

Area
  - Total: 4.56 km^{2} (1.76 sq mi)

Population (2007)
  - Total: 91,536
  - Density: 20,000/km^{2} (52,000/sq mi)
- Website: Official website

The Second Municipality (In Italian: Seconda Municipalità or Municipalità 2) is one of the ten boroughs in which the Italian city of Naples is divided. It is the smallest municipality by area.

== Geography ==
The municipality is located in the middle of the city. In its territory there are located the port and the central railway station.

Its territory includes the zones of Quartieri Spagnoli, Borgo Orefici and Forcella.

== Administrative division ==
The Second Municipality is divided into 6 quarters:

| Quarter | Population | Area (km²) |
|---|---|---|
| Avvocata | 43,002 | 1.22 |
| Mercato | 9,617 | 0.39 |
| Montecalvario | 25,167 | 0.75 |
| Pendino | 15,625 | 0.63 |
| Porto | 4,507 | 1.14 |
| San Giuseppe | 5,587 | 0.43 |
| Total | 91,536 | 4.56 |
