= Santa Restituta =

Church in Naples, southern Italy

Coordinates: 40.8529°N 14.2594°E

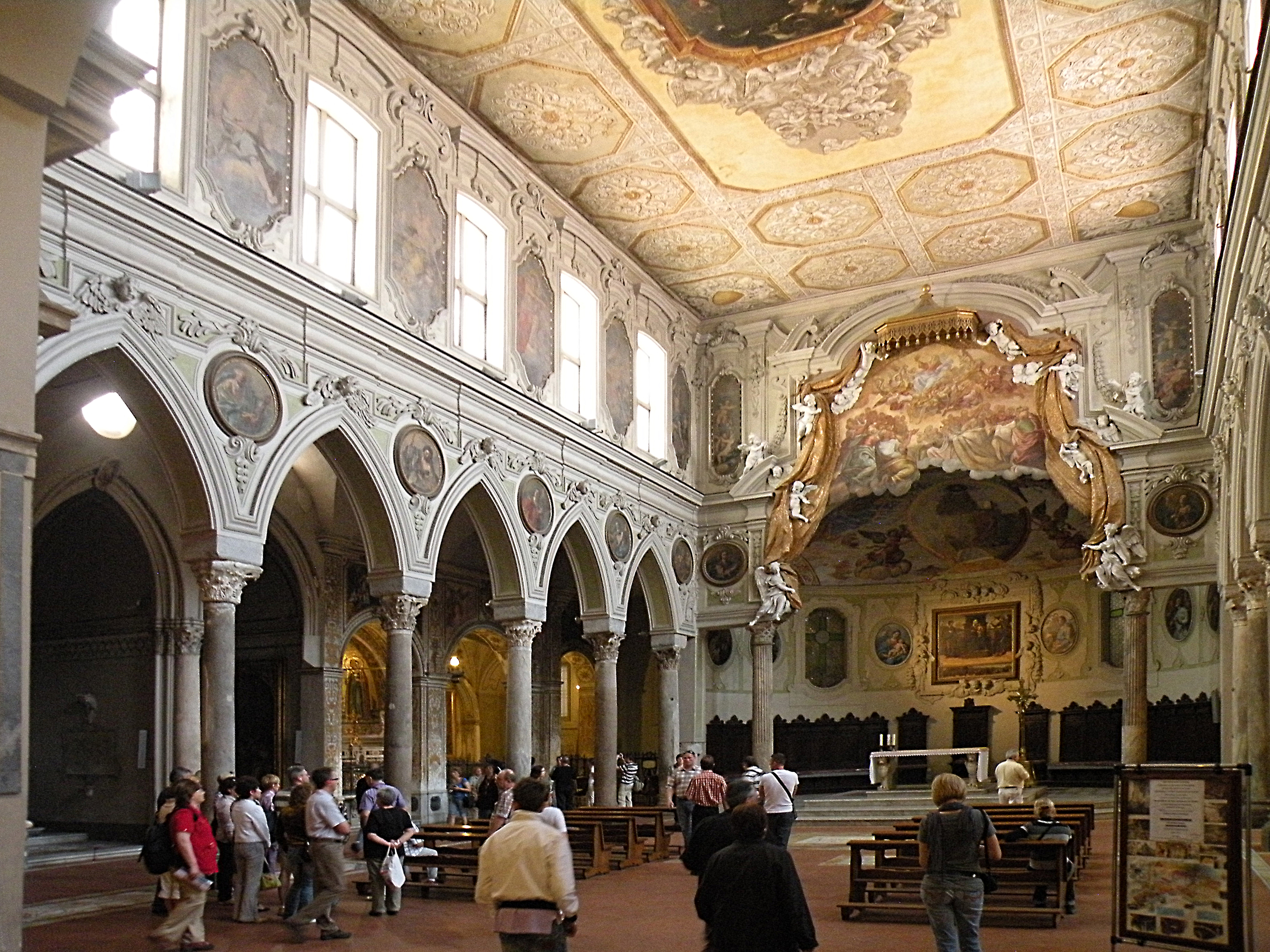
Interior.

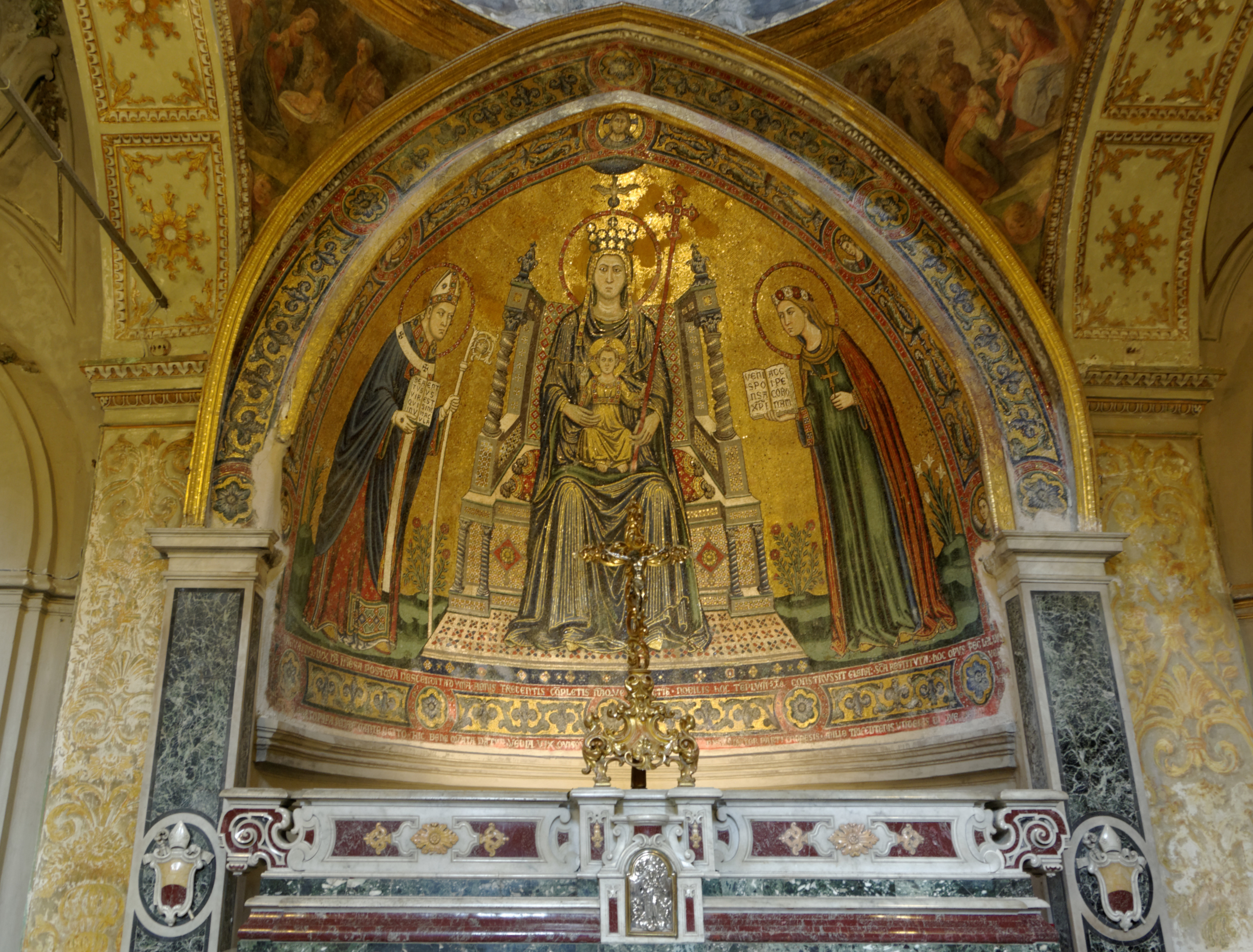
Early Christian frescoes

Santa Restituta is a church in Naples, southern Italy, dedicated to Saint Restituta. The foundation of the basilica is attributed to the Emperor Constantine the Great in the 4th century and is mentioned in a passage from the life of Pope Sylvester I in the Liber pontificalis:

"[...] at that time, the emperor Constantine built a basilica in the city of Naples."

The basilica is most likely located on the site previously occupied by an ancient temple of Apollo.

It is the original palaeo-Christian church on the site where the Cathedral of Naples now stands, and was rebuilt and incorporated into the cathedral when it built in the 13th century.

In the crypt are archaeological remains: a Greek wall, belonging to the temple of Apollo, in opus reticulatum. Under the apse the peristyle of a late imperial domus was found, whose peristyle is still evident. Also, a stretch of Roman aqueduct after the foundation of the city and a stretch of Greek road on an inclined plane.

Santa Restituta has a nave with two aisles divided by 27 antique columns, and forms a large, separate part of the cathedral.
