= San Giuseppe, Naples =

Coordinates: 40°50′43″N 14°15′05″E

San Giuseppe
- Quarter of Naples
- Location of San Giuseppe within Naples
- Country: Italy
- Region: Campania
- City: Naples
- Municipalità: 2nd

Area
  - Total: 0.43 km^{2} (0.17 sq mi)

Population
  - Total: 5,191
  - Density: 12,000/km^{2} (31,000/sq mi)
- Postal codes: 80134 and 80138

San Giuseppe (Italian: "St. Joseph") is a quarter of Naples, southern Italy, which includes many of the points of interest on the western side of the historic centre of the city, including the square and church of Gesù Nuovo, the buildings along via Benedetto Croce (also known as Spaccanapoli) and the square, Piazza San Domenico Maggiore.
