= Porto, Naples =

Coordinates: 40°50′37″N 14°15′22″E

Porto
- Quarter of Naples
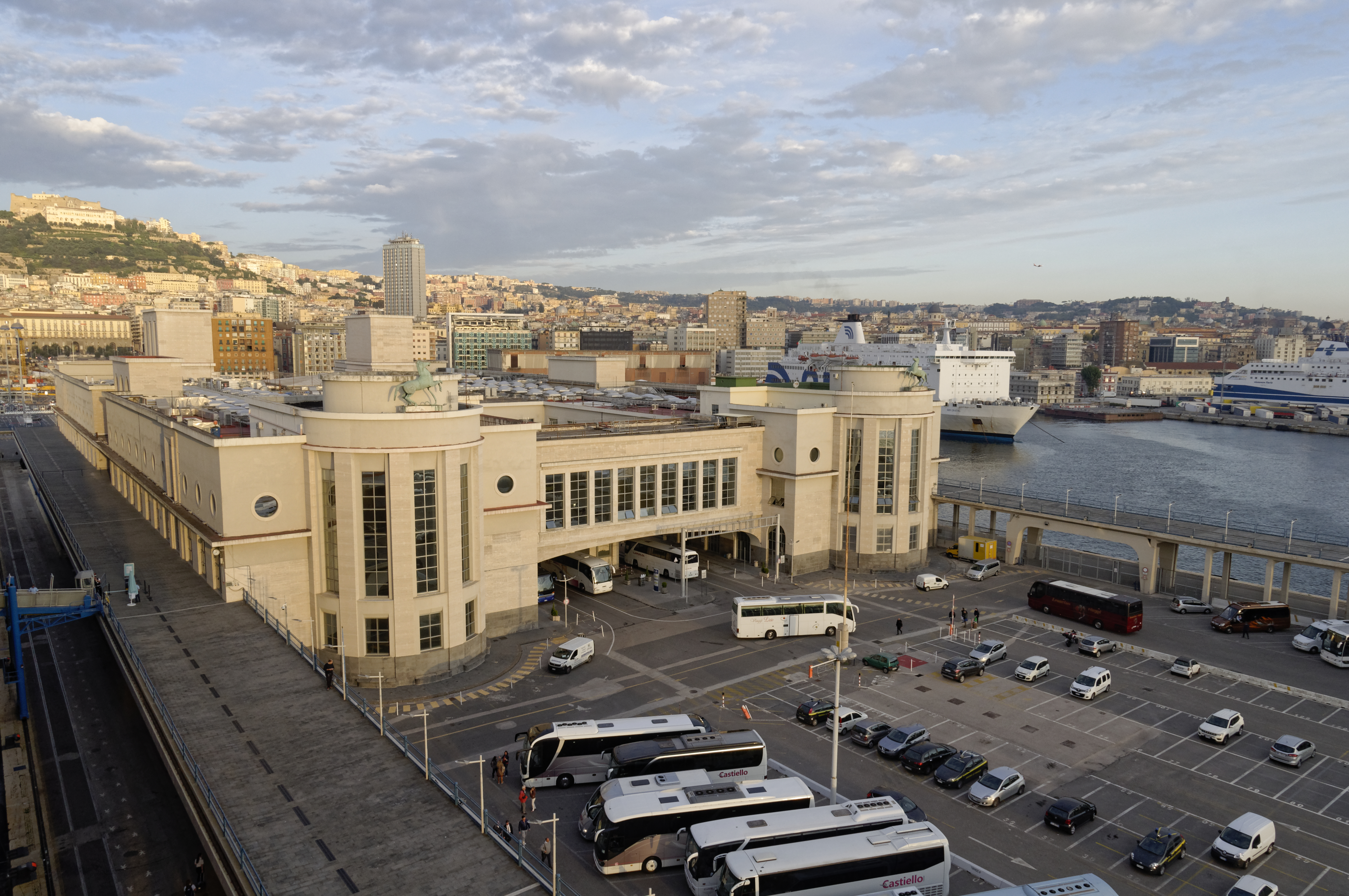
- The cruise terminal

- Location of Porto within Naples
- Country: Italy
- Region: Campania
- City: Naples
- Municipalità: 2nd

Area
  - Total: 1.14 km^{2} (0.44 sq mi)

Population
  - Total: 4,830
  - Density: 4,240/km^{2} (11,000/sq mi)
- Postal code: 80133

Porto (Italian: "port") is one of the thirty quarters ("quartieri") of the city of Naples. It covers 1.14 square kilometres (0.44 sq mi), and as of 2009, had 5738 inhabitants.

Porto is in the 2nd municipality subdivision (which covers Avvocata, Mercato, Montecalvario, Pendino, Porto, and San Giuseppe), adjacent to the main passenger and freight terminals of the Port of Naples, in the historic part of the city.

During the end of the 19th century and the beginning of the 20th, Porto was the subject of a demolition and urban renewal program. Its strategic location near the port made it a target of Allied Forces bombings during World War II.

Prominent intact architectural landmarks in the area include the University of Naples and the Palazzo della Borsa.

== Bibliography ==
- "Bollettino di Statistica - 2009" (in Italian). Comune di Napoli. p. 12.
