= Piazza Garibaldi, Naples =

Public square in Naples, Italy

Piazza Garibaldi
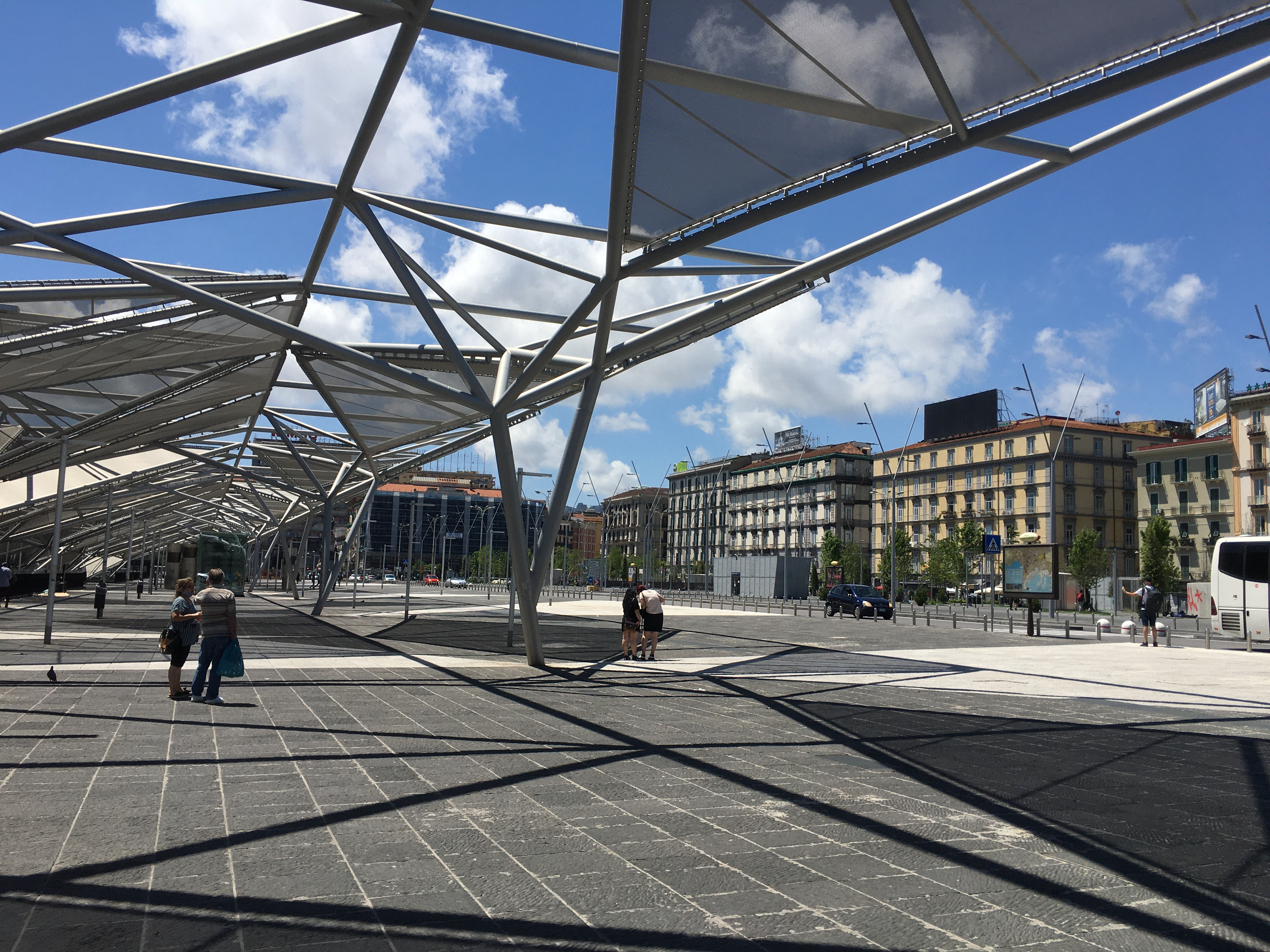
- Piazza Garibaldi in 2020
- Interactive map of Piazza Garibaldi
- Area: 70,000 m²
- Location: Naples, Italy
- Quarter: Pendino, Mercato, San Lorenzo and Zona Industriale.
- Nearest metro station: Naples Metro (Line 1 and Line 2) and Circumvesuviana

Construction
- Inauguration: 1866

Piazza Garibaldi is a square in Naples, Italy, located at the boundary between the quarters of Pendino, Mercato, San Lorenzo and Zona Industriale.

It is one of the largest public squares in Italy by area and one of the city's most important and busiest transportation hubs. Since 1866, it has faced Napoli Centrale railway station, the seventh-busiest railway station in Italy by passenger traffic. The square is also served by Line 1, Line 2, and the Circumvesuviana network.

== History and description ==
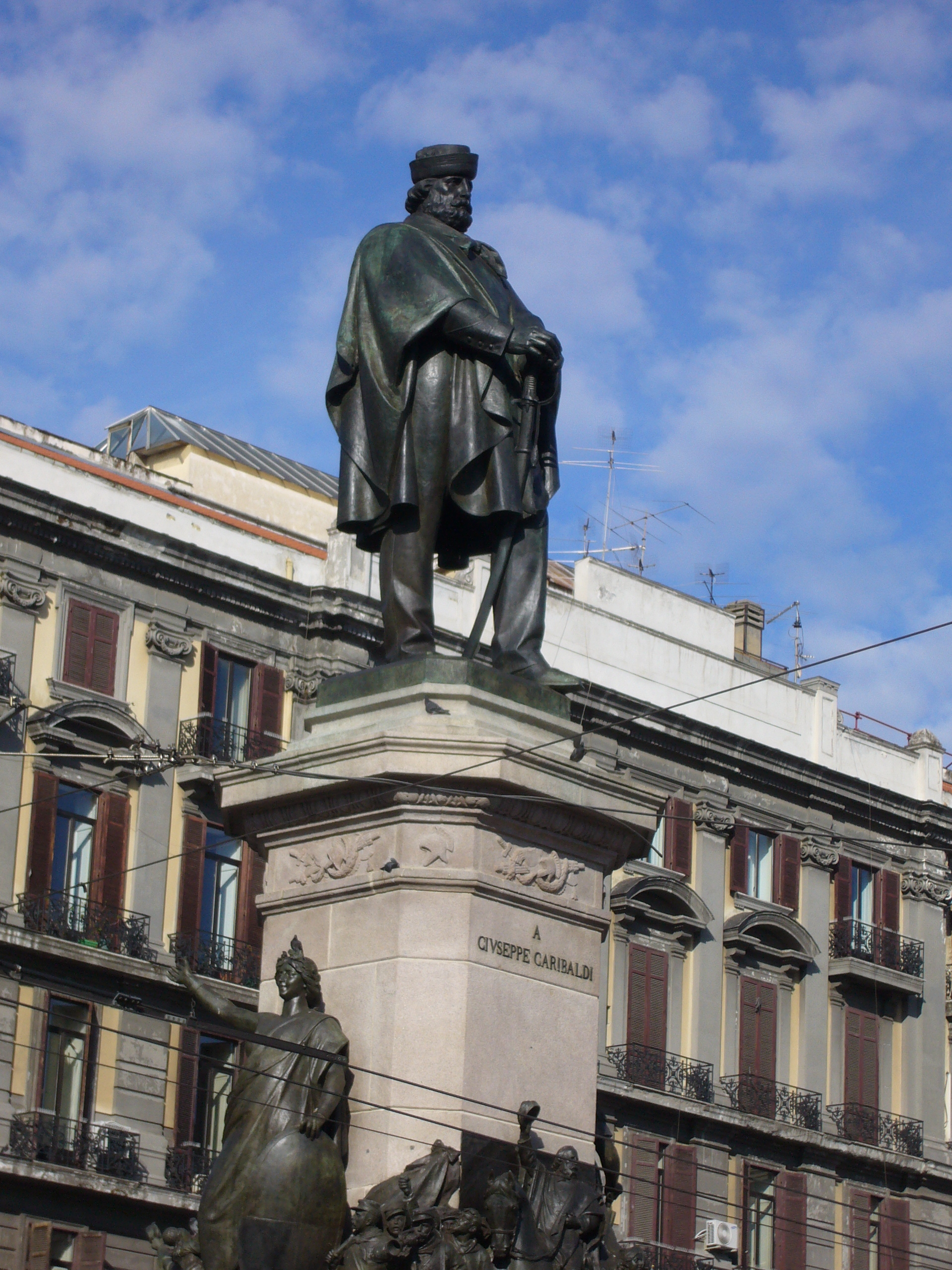
The statue of Giuseppe Garibaldi from which the square takes its name

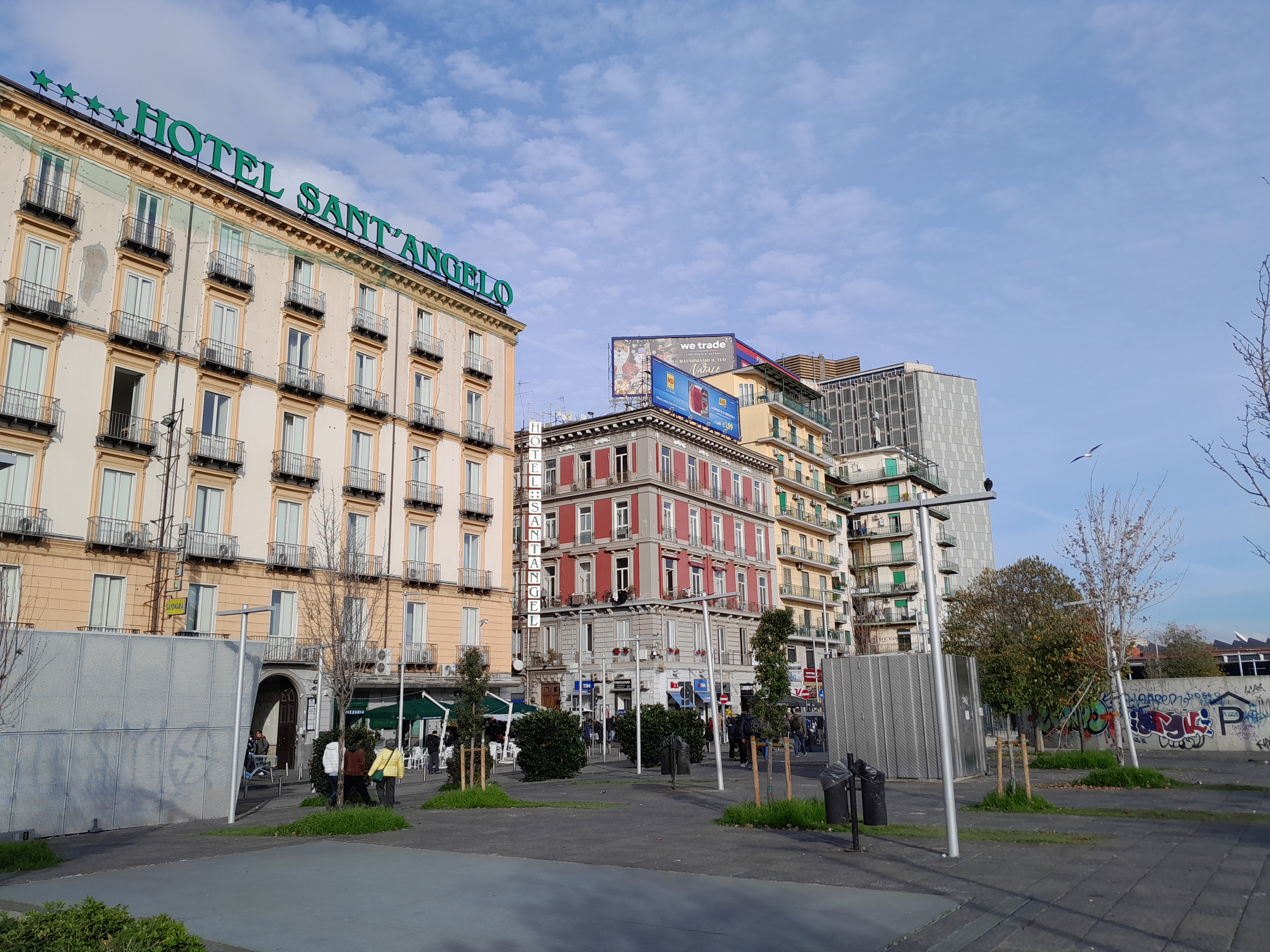
Piazza Garibaldi

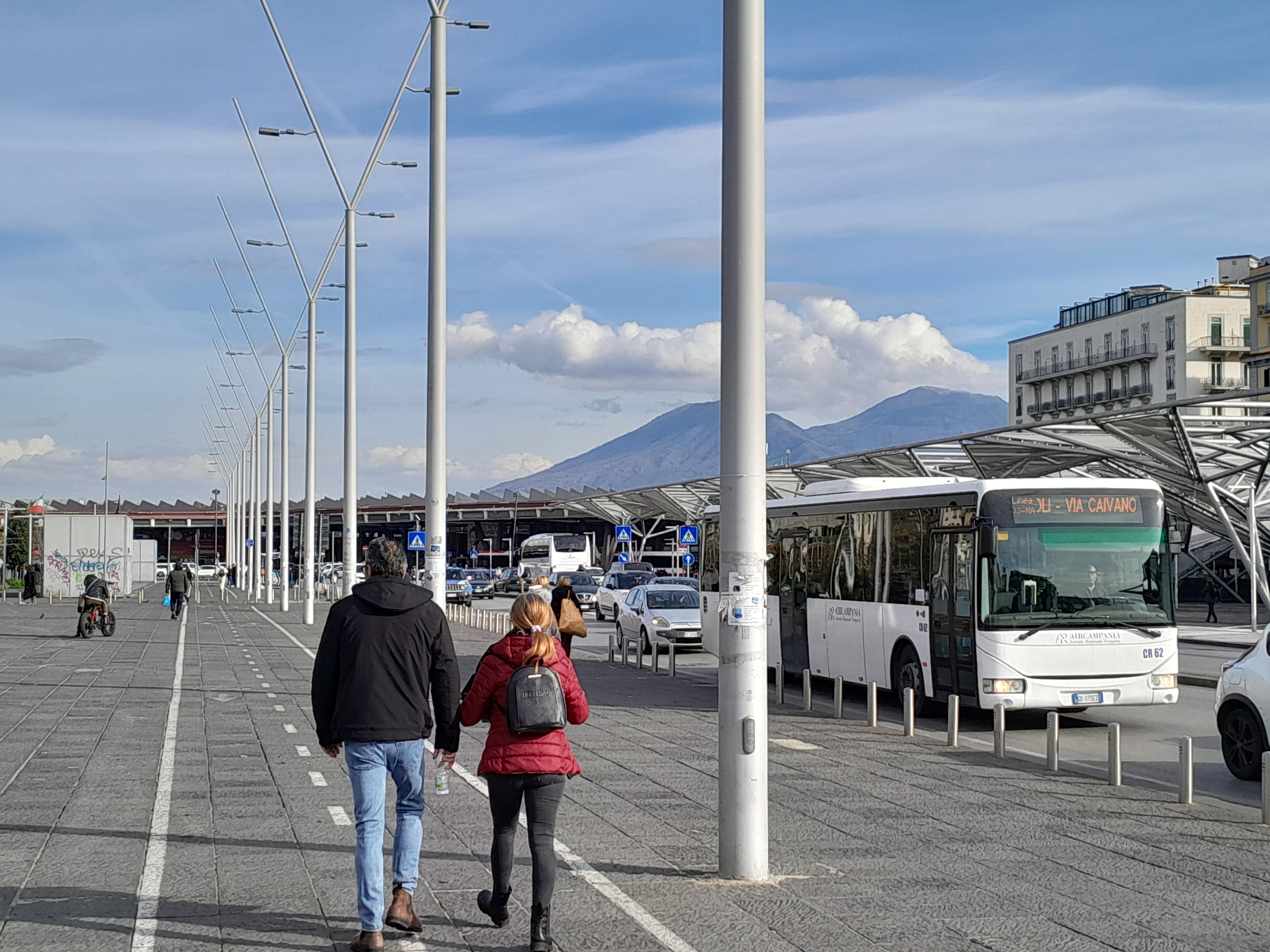
Piazza Garibaldi

The square was created after the Italian unification following the construction of the new railway station along the Strada dei Fossi (present-day Corso Garibaldi). It was initially known as Piazza della Stazione or Piazza della Ferrovia until 1891, when Giuseppe Saredo, then Royal Commissioner of Naples, decreed that it be renamed Piazza dell'Unità Italiana.

At the centre of the square, now positioned on the left side following the square's enlargement, a monument to Giuseppe Garibaldi by Cesare Zocchi was inaugurated in 1904. Its construction was linked to the celebration of the principal figures of Italian unification promoted during the early years of the House of Savoy monarchy. The square subsequently became known as Piazza Garibaldi.

The present layout dates from the early 1960s, when the former station building was demolished and rebuilt farther back from the square. As a result, Piazza Garibaldi was significantly enlarged and the underground Napoli Piazza Garibaldi railway station, originally opened in 1925, was reconstructed beneath it. The current station complex was completed in 1960.

The redesigned square was conceived primarily to accommodate increasing automobile traffic and was dominated by the so-called proboscide, a large canopy extending from the station roof that served as a bus terminal. The structure was demolished at the end of 2000.

The square functions as a major intermodal transport hub, integrating rail, metro, tram, trolleybus, urban bus and regional bus services. It also includes two taxi ranks, bus terminals and an interchange parking facility operated by Rete Ferroviaria Italiana.

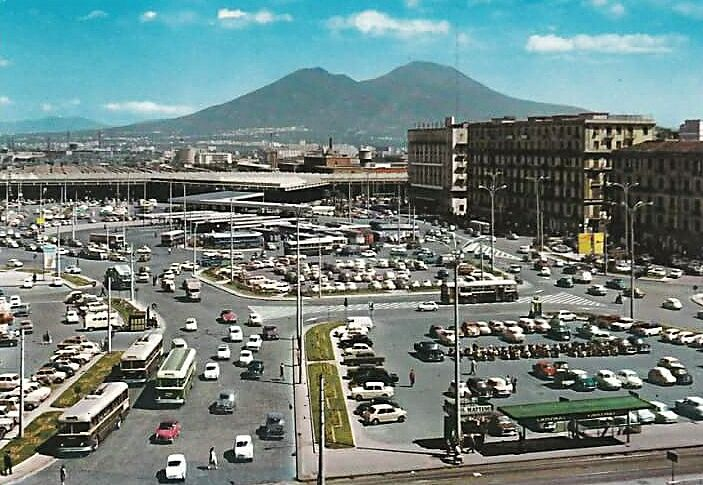
Postcard of the square from 1971, with Mount Vesuvius in the background.

Among the principal architectural features are Napoli Centrale railway station, designed by Pier Luigi Nervi, Bruno Zevi and other architects around 1960, with its distinctive pyramidal roof and the adjacent railway office tower; the Line 1 metro station and its extensive underground shopping gallery designed by Dominique Perrault; the monument to Giuseppe Garibaldi; and a number of Neoclassical and Art Nouveau buildings, many of which house hotels, hostels, guesthouses and bed and breakfasts.

Until 1924, the Fontana della Sirena stood in the gardens of the former railway station opposite the Garibaldi monument. It was later relocated to Piazza Sannazaro.

The square underwent a major redevelopment based on a 2004 project by Dominique Perrault, carried out in parallel with the renovation of the railway station. Construction began in 2006 and involved a complete reorganisation of the area's traffic circulation, centred on a broad longitudinal roadway. The project also created a large urban park on the northern side, including an amphitheatre, commercial pavilions and children's play areas, as well as an underground promenade and shopping gallery on the southern side, covered by a network of semi-transparent metal canopies.

Historic views of Piazza Garibaldi

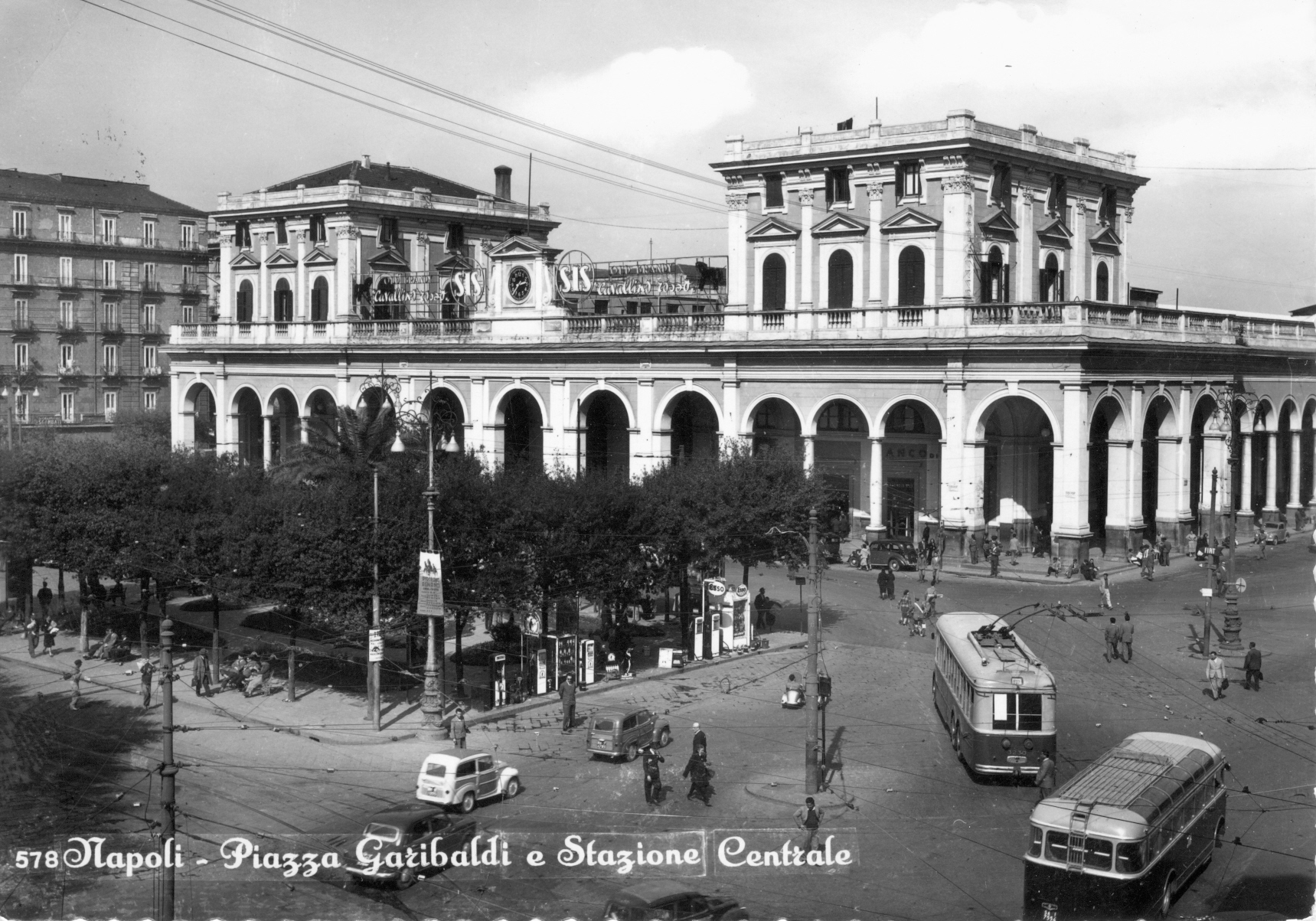
The original station building.

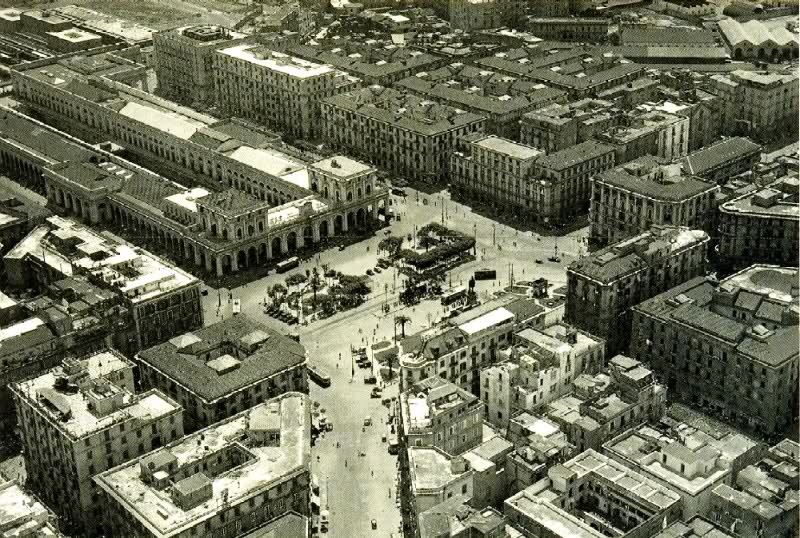
Aerial view of Piazza Garibaldi when the original station was still standing. The square was considerably smaller than it is today.

== See also ==
- Napoli Centrale railway station
