= Mercato, Naples =

Coordinates: 40°50′51″N 14°16′20″E

Mercato
- Quarter of Naples
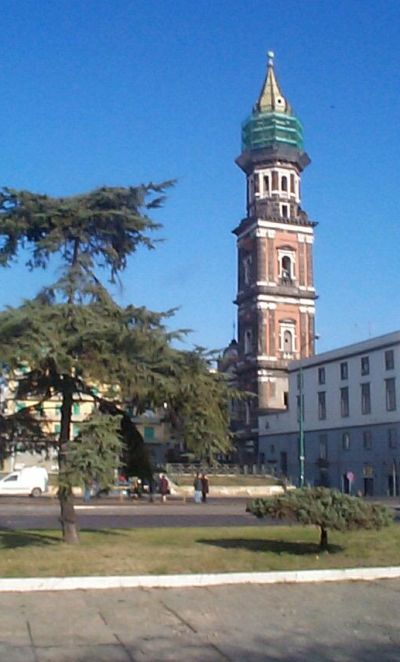
- Church of the Santa Maria del Carmine in Mercato

- Location of Mercato within Naples
- Country: Italy
- Region: Campania
- City: Naples
- Municipalità: 2nd

Area
  - Total: 0.39 km^{2} (0.15 sq mi)

Population
  - Total: 9.352
  - Density: 24/km^{2} (62/sq mi)
- Postal code: 80142

Mercato (Italian and Neapolitan for "market") is a neighbourhood or quartiere of Naples, southern Italy. It is in the southeastern part of the city, bounded by the industrial port of Naples on the south.

At the centre of the area is the Piazza Mercato or "market square", the medieval marketplace of the city. At the apex of the half-moon of the piazza is the church of Santa Croce e Purgatorio al Mercato. Visible to the east and west respectively are the belltowers and parts of the façade of Sant'Eligio Maggiore and the church of Santa Maria del Carmine. The square was the site of the execution of Conradin.

It was also where Masaniello's revolt broke out and also the site of the executions after the royalist retaking of the kingdom after the fall of the Parthenopean Republic of 1799.

The area was somewhat cut off from the rest of the city, inland, by the urban renewal (risanamento) of the early 1900s. Also, it was severely damaged by bombings in World War II.

== Sources ==
- Napoli e i Luoghi Celebri delle sue Vicinanze, Napoli 1845 online version
