= Rohtaed =

1942 novel by Karl Ristikivi

- Title page for Rohtaed (1985 edition)
- Author: Karl Ristikivi
- Language: Estonian
- Series: Tallinn trilogy
- Publisher: Tartu Eesti Kirjastus
- Publication date: 1942
- Publication place: Estonia
- Pages: 412
- ISBN: 978-9949-442-39-3
- Preceded by: Õige mehe koda

Rohtaed (English: The Herb Garden) is a novel by Estonian author Karl Ristikivi. It was first published in 1942 by Tartu Eesti Kirjastus.

The novel is the third in his Tallinn Trilogy, following Tuli ja raud (Fire and Iron, 1938) and Õige mehe koda (The Abode of a Righteous Man, 1940). The trilogy provides a panorama of social, economic and intellectual conditions in Tallinn over several generations. Every book in the trilogy is dedicated to a different class of newly urbanised Estonians, with Rohtaed being about a teacher.

The novel follows Juulius Kilimit, an idealistic schoolmaster, through his studies and into maturity.

Arcadia is a theme in the novel. When Kilimit, while travelling to his birthplace far from Tallinn, and arrives at the coast, he realises that he has never noticed the sea in Tallinn, and experiences it now as if for the first time.
