= Imede saar =

1964 novel by Karl Ristikivi

- Author: Karl Ristikivi
- Language: Estonian
- Publisher: Eesti Kirjanike Kooperatiiv
- Publication date: 1964
- Publication place: Sweden
- Pages: 295
- ISBN: 9985-3-0706-2

Imede saar (English: The Island of Wonders / The Miraculous Island) is a novel by Estonian author Karl Ristikivi. It was first published in 1964 in Lund, Sweden by Eesti Kirjanike Kooperatiiv (Estonian Writers' Cooperative). In Estonia it was published in 1966.
