= Santa Croce e Purgatorio al Mercato =

Church building in Naples, Italy

Coordinates: 40.847690°N 14.265725°E

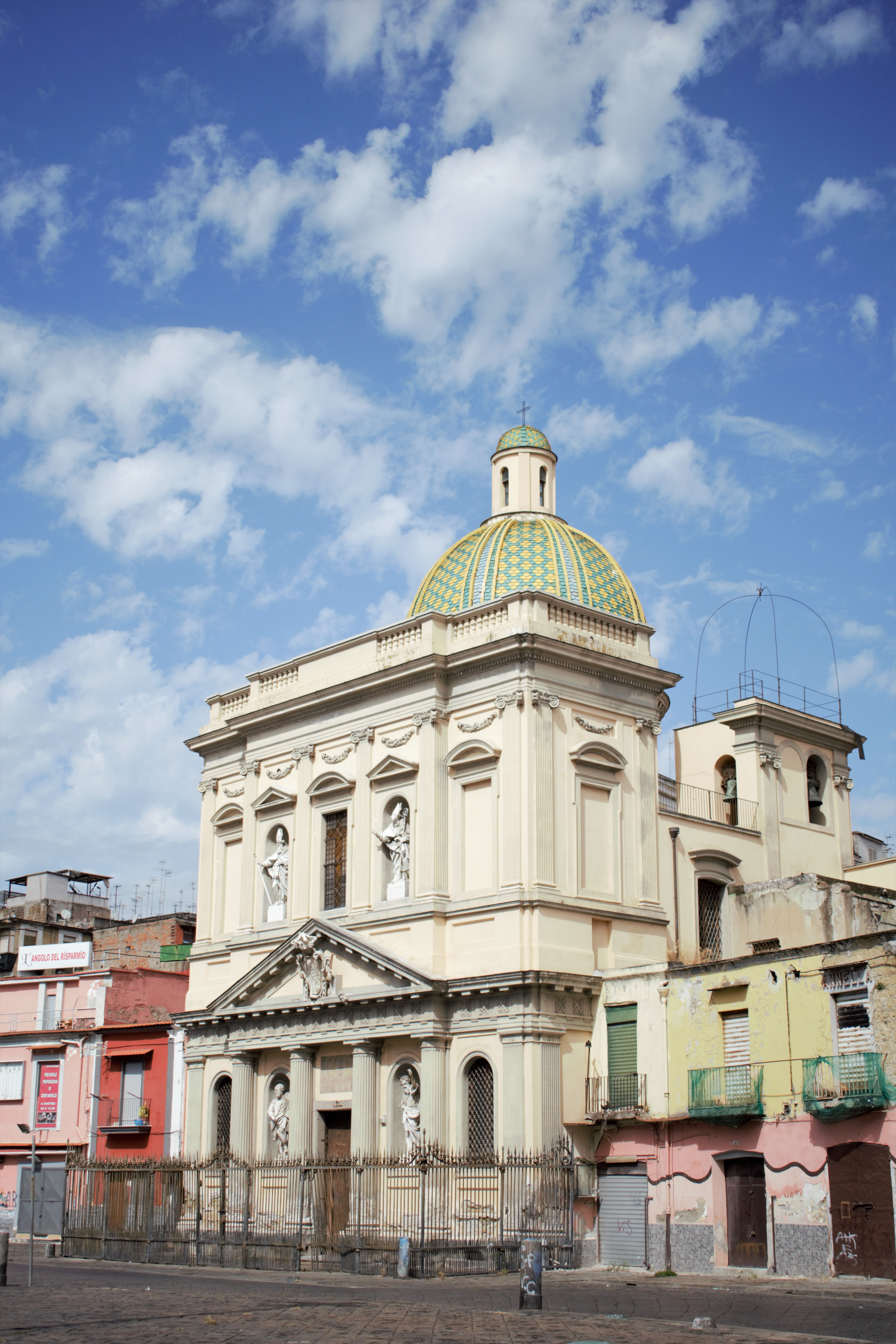
- The façade of Santa Croce e Purgatorio al Mercato

Religion
- Affiliation: Catholicism
- Region: Campania
- Rite: Roman
- Year consecrated: 1791

Location
- Location: Naples
- Country: Italy
- Interactive map of Santa Croce e Purgatorio al Mercato

Architecture
- Architect: Francesco Sicuro
- Groundbreaking: 1786

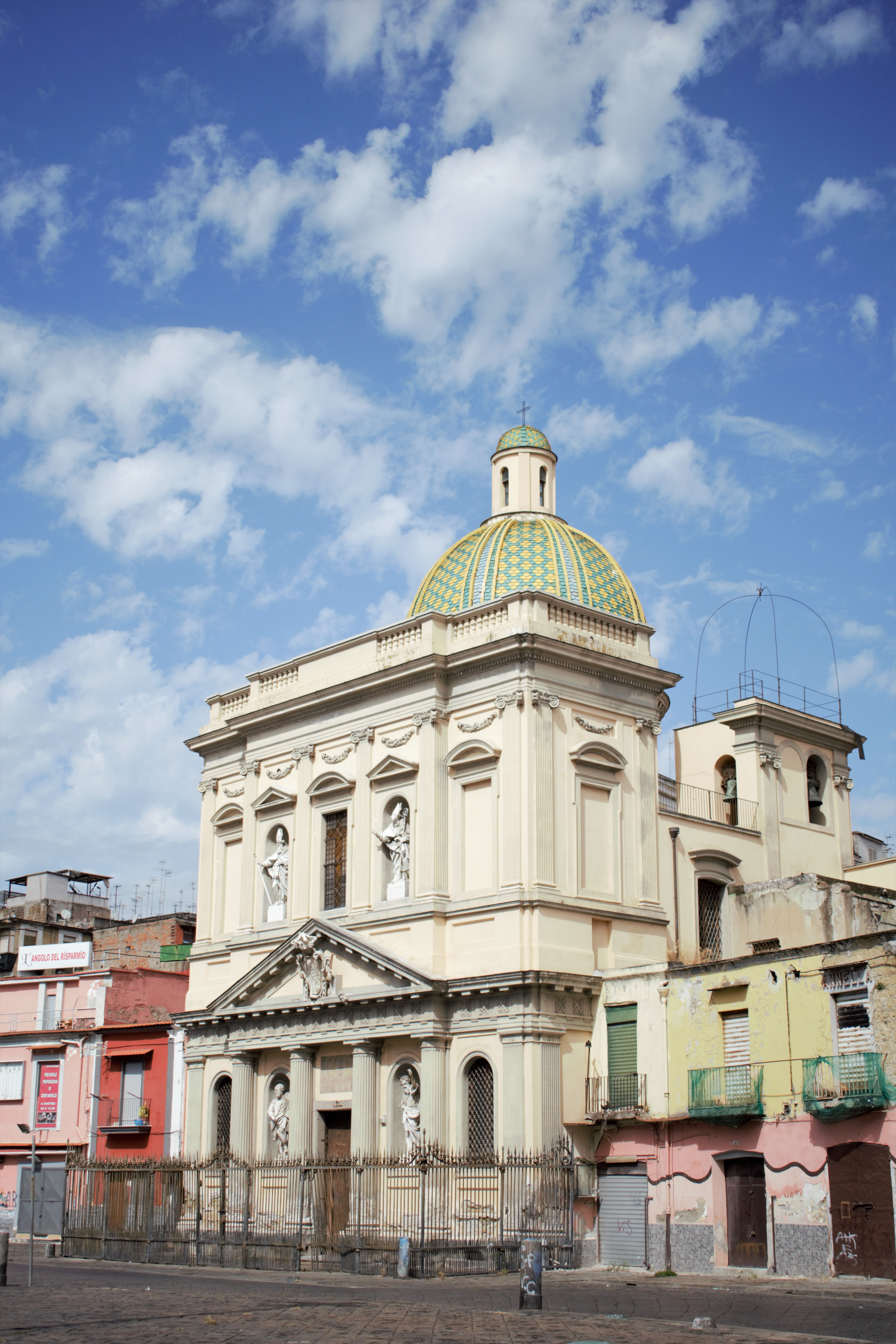
The façade of Santa Croce e Purgatorio al Mercato

Santa Croce e Purgatorio al Mercato is a church in the center of the Piazza Mercato, in Naples, Italy.

A religious building has stood at this site since the 13th century when Conradin of Swabia was decapitated by orders of Charles I d'Anjou, on October 29, 1268. A porphyry column at the site read: Asturis ungue, leo pullum rapiens aquilinum; hic deplumavit acephalumque dedit which loosely translates: At the point of Astura, the lion seized the eagle, here without feathers, gave his head. This references the capture of Conradin (eagle) by the Angevin (Lion) at the Torre Astura, and subsequent beheading here without honor.

In 1786 it was reconstructed by Francesco Sicuro, and again in 1781, after a fire destroyed the piazza and church. The church was damaged by the earthquake in 1980, and has been closed since then. Originally the church held paintings by Luca Giordano, but these have been transferred to the Museo Civico di Castel Nuovo.

== Bibliography ==
- Vincenzo Regina, Le chiese di Napoli. Viaggio indimenticabile attraverso la storia artistica, architettonica, letteraria, civile e spirituale della Napoli sacra, Newton e Compton editor, Naples, 2004.
