= Õige mehe koda =

1940 novel by Karl Ristikivi

- 1943 edition
- Author: Karl Ristikivi
- Language: Estonian
- Series: Tallinn trilogy
- Publisher: Ilukirjandus ja Kunst
- Publication date: 1940
- Publication place: Estonia
- Pages: 409
- ISBN: 978-9949-442-24-9
- Preceded by: Tuli ja raud
- Followed by: Rohtaed

Õige mehe koda (English: The House of a Righteous Man) is a novel by Estonian author Karl Ristikivi. It was first published in 1940 by Ilukirjandus ja Kunst.
