= Rõõmulaul =

1966 novel by Karl Ristikivi

- Author: Karl Ristikivi
- Language: Estonian
- Series: Trilogy of biographies
- Publisher: Eesti Kirjanike Kooperatiiv
- Publication date: 1966
- Publication place: Sweden
- Pages: 302
- ISBN: 5-450-01519-4
- Preceded by: Mõrsjalinik
- Followed by: Nõiduse õpilane

Rõõmulaul (English: The Song of Joy) is a novel by Estonian author Karl Ristikivi. It was first published in 1966 in Lund, Sweden, by Eesti Kirjanike Kooperatiiv (Estonian Writers' Cooperative). In Estonia it was published only in 1993.
