= Hingede öö =

1953 novel by Karl Ristikivi

- First edition
- Author: Karl Ristikivi
- Language: Estonian
- Publisher: Eesti Kirjanike Kooperatiiv
- Publication date: 1953
- Publication place: Sweden
- Pages: 307

Hingede öö (All Souls' Night or Night of Souls) is a novel by the Estonian author Karl Ristikivi.

It was first published in 1953 in Lund, Sweden by the exile publishing house Eesti Kirjanike Kooperatiiv (Estonian Writers' Cooperative). The novel was first published in Estonia in the year 1991.

== Synopsis ==
The novel comprises three parts, "Surnud mehe maja" (The House of a Dead Man), a briefer interlude entitled "Kiri proua Agnes Rohumaale" (Letter to Mrs Agnes Rohumaa) and "Seitse tunnistajat" (The Seven Witnesses). The novel is a first-person narrative.

In the first part, a nameless protagonist enters something resembling a concert hall in Stockholm a little before midnight on New Year's Eve and finds himself in a labyrinth of salons and staircases, meeting people from whom he feels alienated.

The second part is written as a reply by the author to a letter sent by a fictional reader, Mrs Agnes Rohumaa. Apparently Mrs Rohumaa has expressed her dissatisfaction with the novel after reading the first part and the author feels obliged to reply and justify his writing.

The last part describes a trial in which seven witnesses are called to give evidence, each for one of the seven deadly sins. The last witness is the protagonist.

== Reception and criticism ==
The novel has usually been considered modernist by critics. The author has said in the text of the novel that it can be read as a "realistic fairy tale".
