= Nõiduse õpilane =

1967 novel by Karl Ristikivi

- Author: Karl Ristikivi
- Language: Estonian
- Series: Trilogy of biographies
- Publisher: Eesti Kirjanike Kooperatiiv
- Publication date: 1967
- Publication place: Sweden
- Pages: 296
- ISBN: 5-450-01525-9
- Preceded by: Rõõmulaul

Nõiduse õpilane (English: Sorcerer's Apprentice / Sorcerer's Disciple / Student of Witchcraft) is a novel by Estonian author Karl Ristikivi. The novel was first published in 1967 in Lund, Sweden by Eesti Kirjanike Kooperatiiv (Estonian Writers' Cooperative). It was published in Estonia in 1994.

In 2025, a Finnish translation of the novel was published (Noitarovio, translated by Antti Salo).
