= Piazza Mercato =

Public square in Naples, Italy

Piazza del Mercato
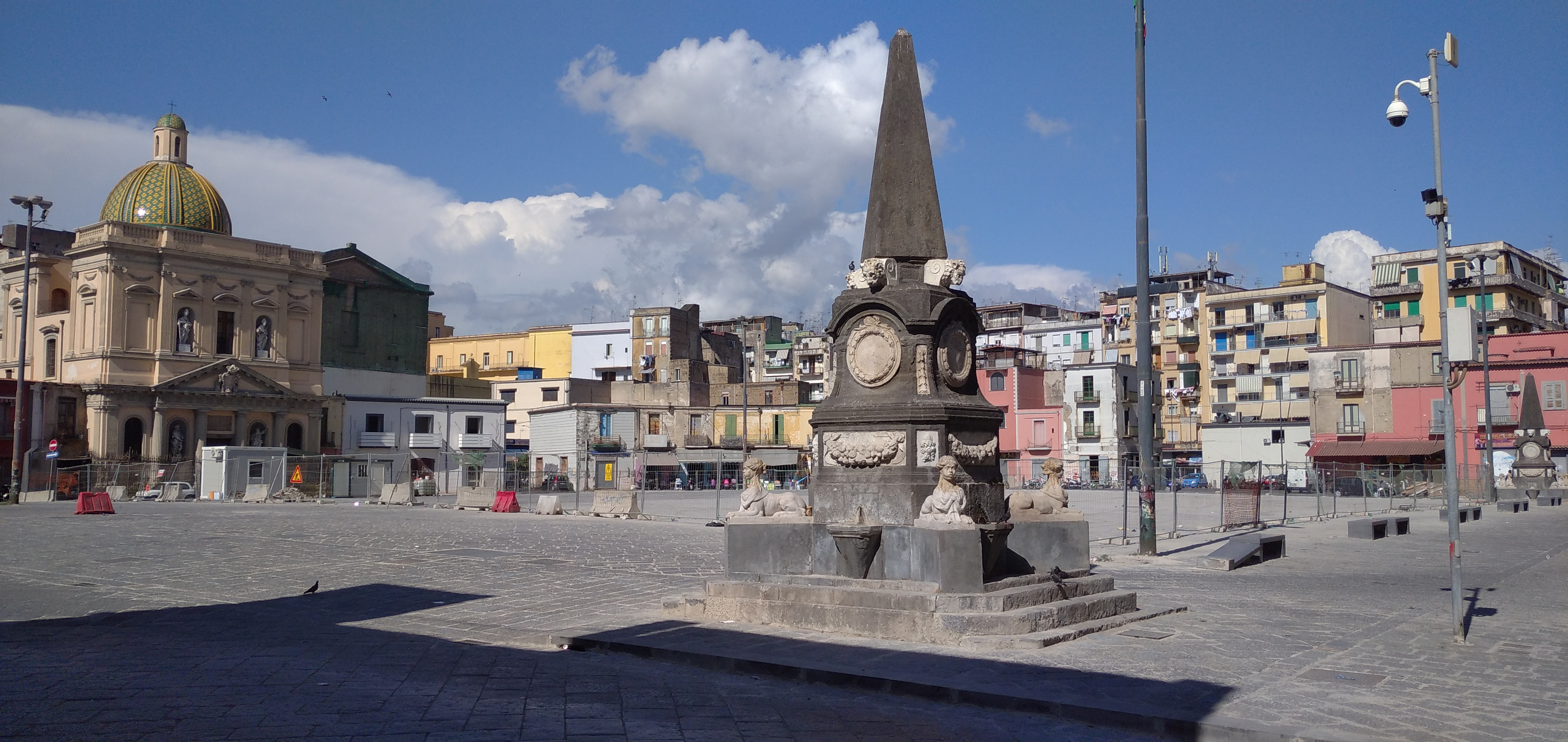
- The square
- Former names: Campo del Moricino; Foro Magno
- Location: Naples, Italy
- Quarter: Pendino

Piazza del Mercato (formerly Foro Magno, commonly Piazza Mercato, lit. City Hall Marketplace) is one of the historic squares of Naples, located in the Pendino district, a short distance from the Mercato district.

It borders Piazza del Carmine and the adjacent Santa Maria del Carmine Church. The square hosts most of the festivals organized by the basilica; at the end of May, fireworks and the procession of the "raising of the flags" also take place.

== History ==
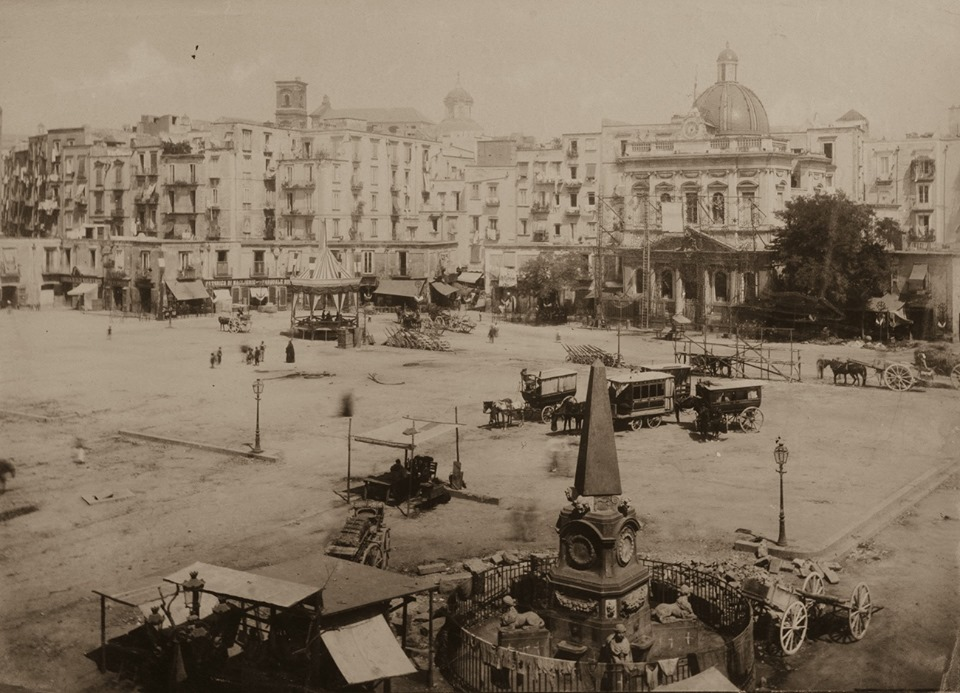
The square in a late 19th-century image

Today it is one of the main squares of the city, but originally it was an irregular open space outside the city walls, called Campo del Moricino (or muricino), "because it was attached to the city’s defensive walls".

The Angevin rulers made it a major commercial center: in 1270, under Charles I of Anjou, the city’s market was moved from the square of San Lorenzo (today Piazza San Gaetano, which had hosted it since the Greco-Roman era) to this extra-moenia area, now called the market of Sant'Eligio and mainly Foro Magno. It became a key hub for trade routes from major Italian and European commercial bases and a driver of urban development along the coastal strip.

From 29 October 1268 to 11 September 1800, capital executions were carried out here: the first executed was Conradin, and the last was Luisa Sanfelice, linked to the events following the suppression of the Parthenopean Republic of 1799.

The square is also famous as the place where the revolt of Masaniello began. He was born and lived in a house behind the square, where today a commemorative plaque has been placed (since 1997), reading:

In this place stood the house where he was born
on 29 June 1620
Tommaso Aniello D'Amalfi
and where he lived when he was captain general
of the Neapolitan people

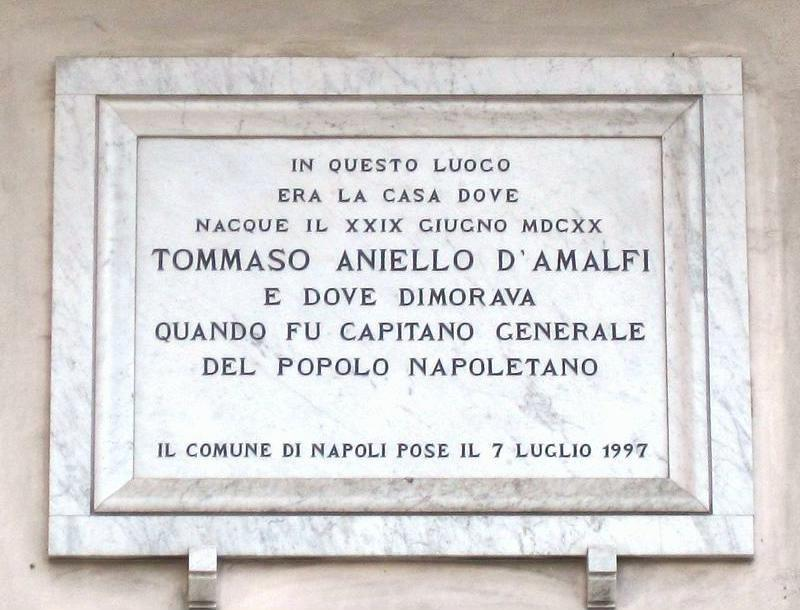

In 1781, the many wooden shops in the square caught fire after a fireworks display. By order of King Ferdinand IV of Bourbon, an exedra was built around the perimeter of the square to provide a proper arrangement for commercial activities. The project was led by architect Francesco Sicuro, who also designed the Church of Santa Croce e Purgatorio by merging two pre-existing churches destroyed by the fire, as well as three fountains that decorated the square.

Allied bombing during World War II severely damaged the port area and the square and its surroundings. In 1958, the Palazzo Ottieri was built south of the square, replacing older buildings and the historic street layout. The large building became a visual barrier separating it from nearby Piazza del Carmine.

Many traders later moved outside the city to the Centro Ingrosso Sviluppo (CIS) of Nola, opened in 1986, accelerating a decline that had begun after the war. Isolated from major traffic routes such as Corso Umberto I and Via Marina, the square long functioned mainly as an open-air parking area, while acts of vandalism affected its monuments.

== Monuments and landmarks ==
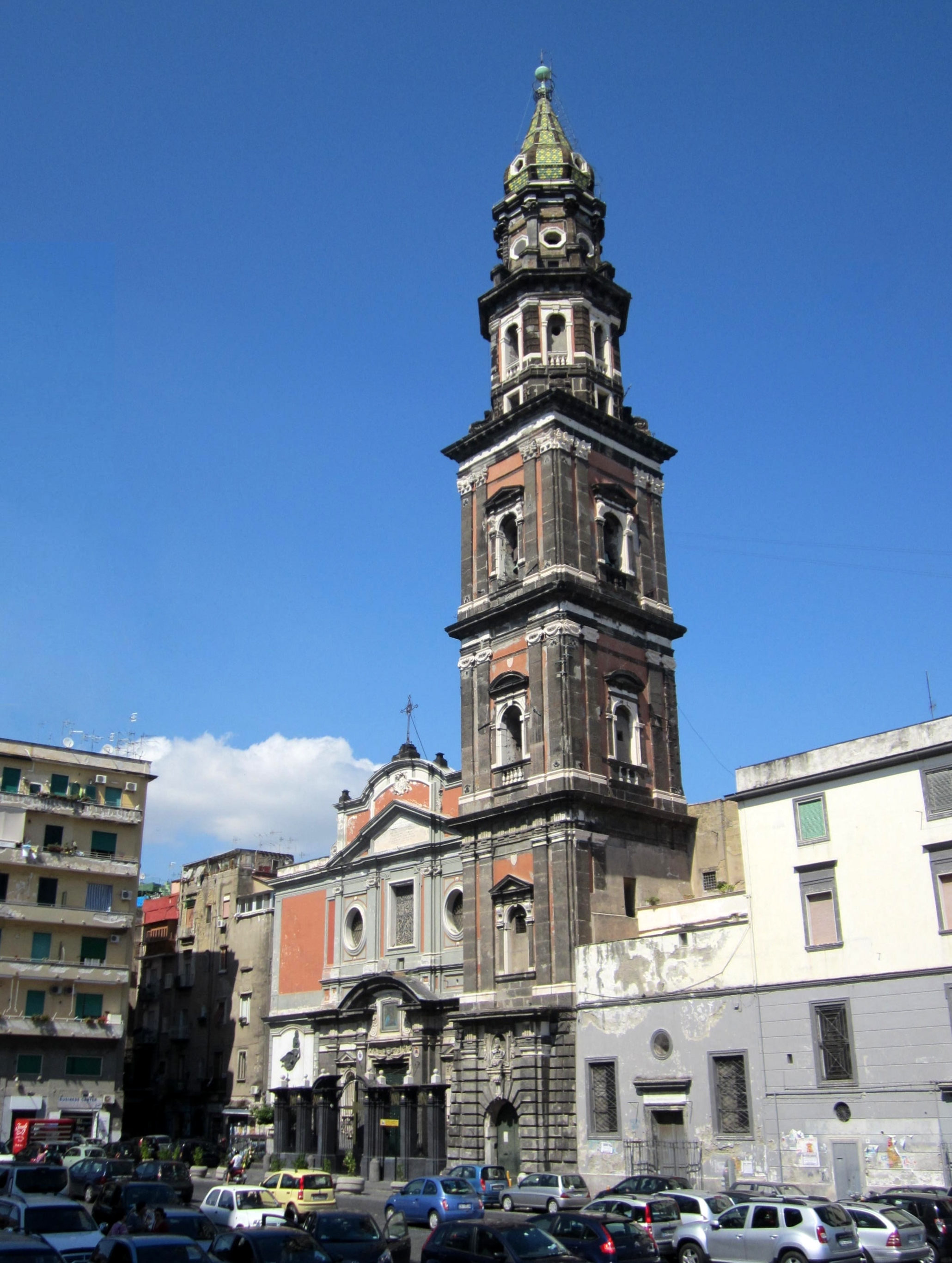
Facade of the Basilica of Santa Maria del Carmine Maggiore

The square is decorated with two 18th-century fountain-obelisks (on the east and west sides). At its centre stands the exedra containing the Church of Santa Croce e Purgatorio al Mercato, designed by Francesco Sicuro. The Church of Sant'Eligio Maggiore and the Basilica of Santa Maria del Carmine Maggiore are also visible from the square.

There were originally three additional fountains. One was the Fontana dei Delfini, from which Masaniello is believed to have addressed the crowd. The monument was purchased in 1812 by the municipality of Cerreto Sannita and is now located in its main square.

The second fountain was erected in 1653 under the viceregal government of the Count of Oñate, Íñigo Vélez de Guevara. Designed by Cosimo Fanzago, it was called the Fontana Maggiore and stood on the right side of the square. It was restored by Francesco Sicuro in 1788 but no longer exists.

The third fountain, the Fontana dei Leoni, was also created by Sicuro. Since the 1930s it has been located in the gardens of Molosiglio.

== Bibliography ==
- Ruggiero, Gennaro. Le piazze di Napoli. Tascabili economici Newton, Rome, 1998. ISBN 88-7983-846-6
- Alisio, Giancarlo. Urbanistica napoletana del Settecento. Edizioni Dedalo, 2nd ed., 1993. ISBN 88-220-3335-3
- Pescitelli, Renato. Documenti di Storia Municipale di Cerreto: Regesto delle deliberazioni del Decurionato degli anni 1808-1813. TetaPrint, 2011
- Capasso, Sosia. Vendita dei Comuni e vicende della Piazza Mercato a Napoli. Istituto di Studi Atellani
- Gleijeses, Vittorio. Questa è Napoli, vol. I. Fausto Fiorentino Editore, Naples, 1967
