= Kahekordne mäng =

1972 novel by Karl Ristikivi

- Author: Karl Ristikivi
- Language: Estonian
- Series: Trilogy of interweavements
- Publisher: Eesti Kirjanike Kooperatiiv
- Publication date: 1972
- Publication place: Sweden
- Pages: 264
- ISBN: 9985-3-0750-X
- Preceded by: Lohe hambad

Kahekordne mäng (English: Double Play) is a novel by Estonian author Karl Ristikivi. It was first published in 1972 in Lund, Sweden by Eesti Kirjanike Kooperatiiv (Estonian Writers' Cooperative). In Estonia it was published in 2003.
