= Õilsad südamed =

1970 novel by Karl Ristikivi

- Author: Karl Ristikivi
- Language: Estonian
- Series: Trilogy of interweavements
- Publisher: Eesti Kirjanike Kooperatiiv
- Publication date: 1970
- Publication place: Sweden
- Pages: 248
- ISBN: 9985-3-0751-8
- Followed by: Lohe hambad

Õilsad südamed (English: Noble Hearts) is a novel by Estonian author Karl Ristikivi. It was first published in 1970 in Lund, Sweden by Eesti Kirjanike Kooperatiiv (Estonian Writers' Cooperative). In Estonia it was published in 2004.
