= Rooma päevik =

1976 novel by Karl Ristikivi

- Author: Karl Ristikivi
- Language: Estonian
- Publisher: Eesti Kirjanike Kooperatiiv
- Publication date: 1976
- Publication place: Sweden
- Pages: 231
- ISBN: 9985-61-246-9

Rooma päevik (English: A Roman Diary) is a novel by Estonian author Karl Ristikivi. It was first published in 1976 in Lund, Sweden by Eesti Kirjanike Kooperatiiv (Estonian Writers' Cooperative). In Estonia it was published in 2001. Rooma päevik finishes Ristikivi's series of historical novels.

It is Ristikivi's last book, originally published one year before the author's death. The novel is set in 18th-century Rome, among the Roman ruins and historical buildings. On its title page, the full name of the book is given as Kaspar von Schmerzburgi Rooma päevik (The Roman Diary of Kaspar von Schmerzburg), "published by Karl Ristikivi".

The protagonist (i.e. the purported author of the diary) is called Kaspar von Schmerzburg ("Schmerz" being the German for pain). He walks among the ruins of what was once a huge empire - i.e. the Roman one. He walks in the catacombs and tunnels, and thus sees what is hidden as well as easily viewed from the street. Ristikivi shows his more melancholy and pessimistic side.

After the author's literary mystification, it is a formerly unpublished volume of Tagebuch der Träume (Diary of Dreams) by Johann Friedrich Kaspar von Revingen, who was born in the manor of Tuivere in Estonia on February 9, 1718. The Diary of Dreams was started in 1746 and includes twenty thick volumes, the first selection was printed in 1817, notes Ristikivi in the mock-scholarly afterword.

As Ristikivi says, "it can be determined on the basis of several circumstances" that the authors wrote the diary in 1765, marking the year traditionally as "17**". Entries in the diary are dated from April 30, 17** to May 31, 17**, and book is stopped on half a word.

In the novel, the diarist Schmerzburg encounters a character hinted to be the historian Edward Gibbon who tells of his plan to write a book resembling The History of the Decline and Fall of the Roman Empire.

== Reception ==
The critic Reet Neithal describes the book as: "[Ristikivi's] swan song, a finely textured and poetic travelogue that does not so much describe the travel venues -- the famous monuments of Rome - as the mood of the protagonist and his actions as a result of these. This subtle spiritual diary is one of the author's most personal works".

== Bibliography ==
- Rutt Hinrikus. Rooma päevik as a Synthesis of Karl Ristikivi's European Novels. Interlitteraria 10, 2005.
