= Lohe hambad =

1970 novel by Karl Ristikivi

- Cover of 2005 published version.
- Author: Karl Ristikivi
- Language: Estonian
- Series: Trilogy of interweavements
- Publisher: Eesti Kirjanike Kooperatiiv
- Publication date: 1970
- Publication place: Sweden
- Pages: 252
- ISBN: 9985-3-0989-8
- Preceded by: Õilsad südamed
- Followed by: Kahekordne mäng

Lohe hambad (English: Dragon’s Teeth) is a novel by Estonian author Karl Ristikivi. It was first published in 1970 in Lund, Sweden by Eesti Kirjanike Kooperatiiv (Estonian Writers' Cooperative). In Estonia it was published in 1987.
