= Viimne linn =

1962 novel by Karl Ristikivi

- Cover of 1990 published version.
- Author: Karl Ristikivi
- Language: Estonian
- Series: Trilogy of chronicles
- Genre: Historical novel
- Publisher: Eesti Kirjanike Kooperatiiv
- Publication date: 1962
- Publication place: Sweden
- Pages: 308
- ISBN: 5-450-01472-4
- Preceded by: Põlev lipp
- Followed by: Surma ratsanikud

Viimne linn (English: The Last Citadel) is a historical novel by Estonian author Karl Ristikivi. It was first published in 1962 in Lund, Sweden by Eesti Kirjanike Kooperatiiv (Estonian Writers' Cooperative). In Estonia it was published in 1990.
