= Sigtuna väravad =

1968 novel by Karl Ristikivi

- Author: Karl Ristikivi
- Language: Estonian
- Publisher: Eesti Kirjanike Kooperatiiv
- Publication date: 1968
- Publication place: Sweden
- Pages: 271
- ISBN: 9985-3-0871-9

Sigtuna väravad (English: The Gates of Sigtuna) is a compilation of novels by Estonian author Karl Ristikivi. It was first published in 1968 in Lund, Sweden by Eesti Kirjanike Kooperatiiv (Estonian Writers' Cooperative). In Estonia it was published in 2004.
