= Hando Runnel =

Estonian writer and politician

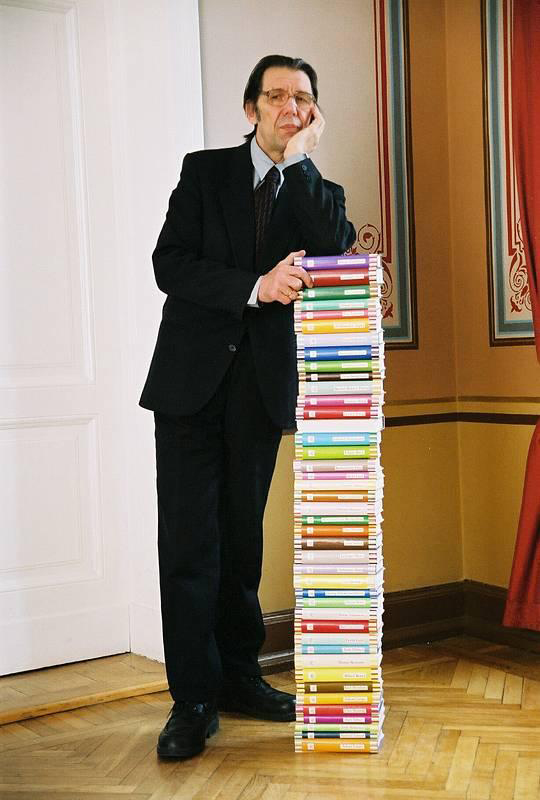
Hando Runnel standing next to the series Eesti Mõttelugu (Estonian History of Thought), 2002

Hando Runnel (born 24 November 1938 in Liutsalu, Järva County) is an Estonian poet.

From 1957 to 1962, he studied agronomy at the Estonian Agricultural Academy. From 1966 to 1971, he worked on the editorial board of the journal Looming. Since 1992, he has been the chairman of the governing council of Ilmamaa Publishers. He was the chief editor of the series Eesti mõttelugu'' (Estonian History of Thought).

== Awards and recognitions ==
- Wiedemann Language Award (2024)
- 1st Class of the Order of the National Coat of Arms (2025)
