= Ohvrilaev =

1960 novel by Gert Helbemäe

- Author: Gert Helbemäe
- Cover artist: Heino Kersna
- Language: Estonian
- Genre: Psychological novel
- Publisher: Eesti Kirjanike Kooperatiiv
- Publication date: 1960
- Publication place: Sweden
- Media type: Print (hardcover)
- Pages: 265
- ISBN: 5-450-01526-7

Ohvrilaev is a novel by Estonian author Gert Helbemäe. It was first published in 1960 in Lund, Sweden by Eesti Kirjanike Kooperatiiv (Estonian Writers' Cooperative). In Estonia it was published in 1992.

== Plot ==
The novel tells a love story between a middle-aged schoolteacher and a young Jewish girl, taking place in the 1930s in Kalamaja.
