= Põlev lipp =

1961 novel by Karl Ristikivi

- Author: Karl Ristikivi
- Language: Estonian
- Series: Trilogy of chronicles
- Publisher: Eesti Kirjanike Kooperatiiv
- Publication date: 1961
- Publication place: Sweden
- Pages: 265
- ISBN: 5-450-01471-6
- Followed by: Viimne linn

Põlev lipp (English: The Burning Flag / The Burning Banner) is a novel by the Estonian author Karl Ristikivi. It depicts King Conradin's Italian campaign. It was first published in 1961 in Lund, Sweden, by Eesti Kirjanike Kooperatiiv (Estonian Writers' Cooperative).

In Estonia it was published in 1990.

A translation into French by Jean Pascal Ollivry, titled L'étendard en flammes, was published in Paris in 2005.
