= Koosa =

Village in Estonia

- Location within Estonia
- Coordinates: 58°31′12″N 27°4′27″E
- Country: Estonia
- County: Tartu County
- Time zone: UTC+2 (EET)

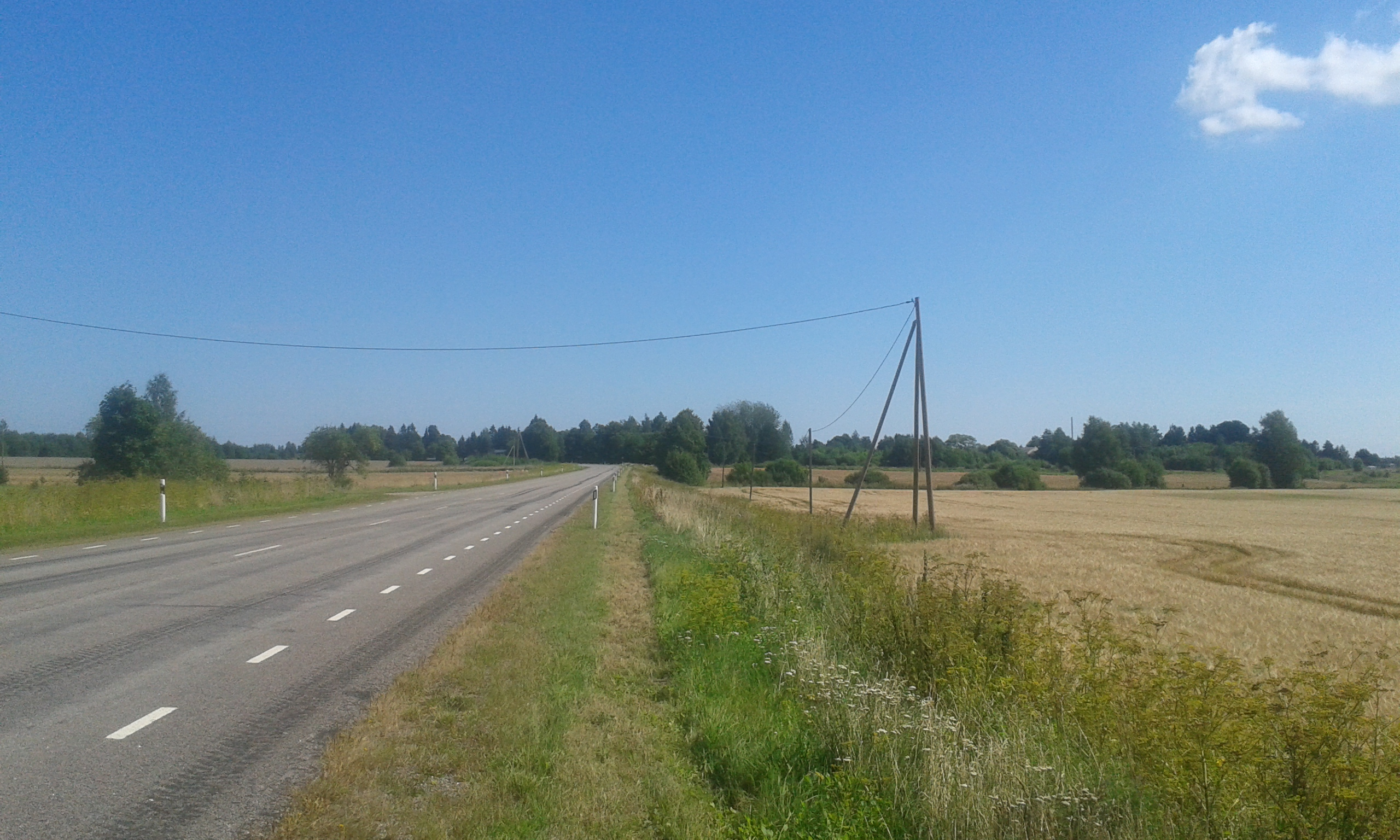
Landscape near Koosa

Koosa is a village in Peipsiääre Parish, Tartu County in eastern Estonia.

== Name ==
Koosa was attested in historical sources as Kosakul or Kosakula (i.e. 'Kosa village') in 1582, Kozakila in 1585, Kosz in 1592, and Koeß in 1601. Valdek Pall assumed that the toponym may originate from a personal name (cf. the surname Koosapoeg 'son of Koosa'). However, it may also be a secondary designation transferred from a hydronym: Lake Koosa (Estonian: Koosa järv) lies 11.5 kilometers (7.1 mi) south-southeast of Koosa, and the Koosa River (Estonian: Koosa jõgi) flows from it into Lake Peipus. Considering the toponym Коса (Kosa) attested for the hamlet of Liivanima at the mouth of the Koosa River on a mid-19th-century map, the Estonian name Koosa may originate from Russian коса 'edge of the land, elongated cape; strip of (forest, sand, etc.)'. Ludwig August Mellin's 1796 Atlas von Liefland (Atlas of Livonia) shows another village named Kosa on the Kargaja River (Estonian: Kargaja jõgi) at the northeastern end of Lake Koosa, and so it is possible that today's village of Koosa was a daughter settlement of the older village located further south.

== Notable people ==
Notable people that were born or lived in Koosa include the following:

- Arvo Mägi (1913–2004), writer and journalist

== See also ==
- Lake Koosa
