= Karl Ristikivi =

Estonian writer

- Born: 16 October 1912; Saulepi Parish, Governorate of Estonia, Russian Empire
- Died: 19 July 1977 (aged 64); Solna, Sweden
- Occupation: Writer
- Years active: 1932-1977

Karl Ristikivi (16 October [O.S. 3 October] 1912 – 19 July 1977) was an Estonian writer. He is known as one of the best Estonian writers for his historical novels.

Ristikivi was one of the first Estonian writers to create a comprehensive panorama of his country's urbanization. Once in Swedish exile, he also wrote the first Estonian surrealist novel, a work that is strongly influenced by existentialist philosophy. He orchestrated an impressive cycle of seventeen novels plus other books into a polyphonic unity with a time scale that embraces European history over two millennia. His invention and use of a complicated system of myths and symbols could be compared to the approach of the school of semiotic writers. Humanism, Christian religion, and traditional ethics are considered the chief legacy of his works.

== Early life and education in Estonia ==
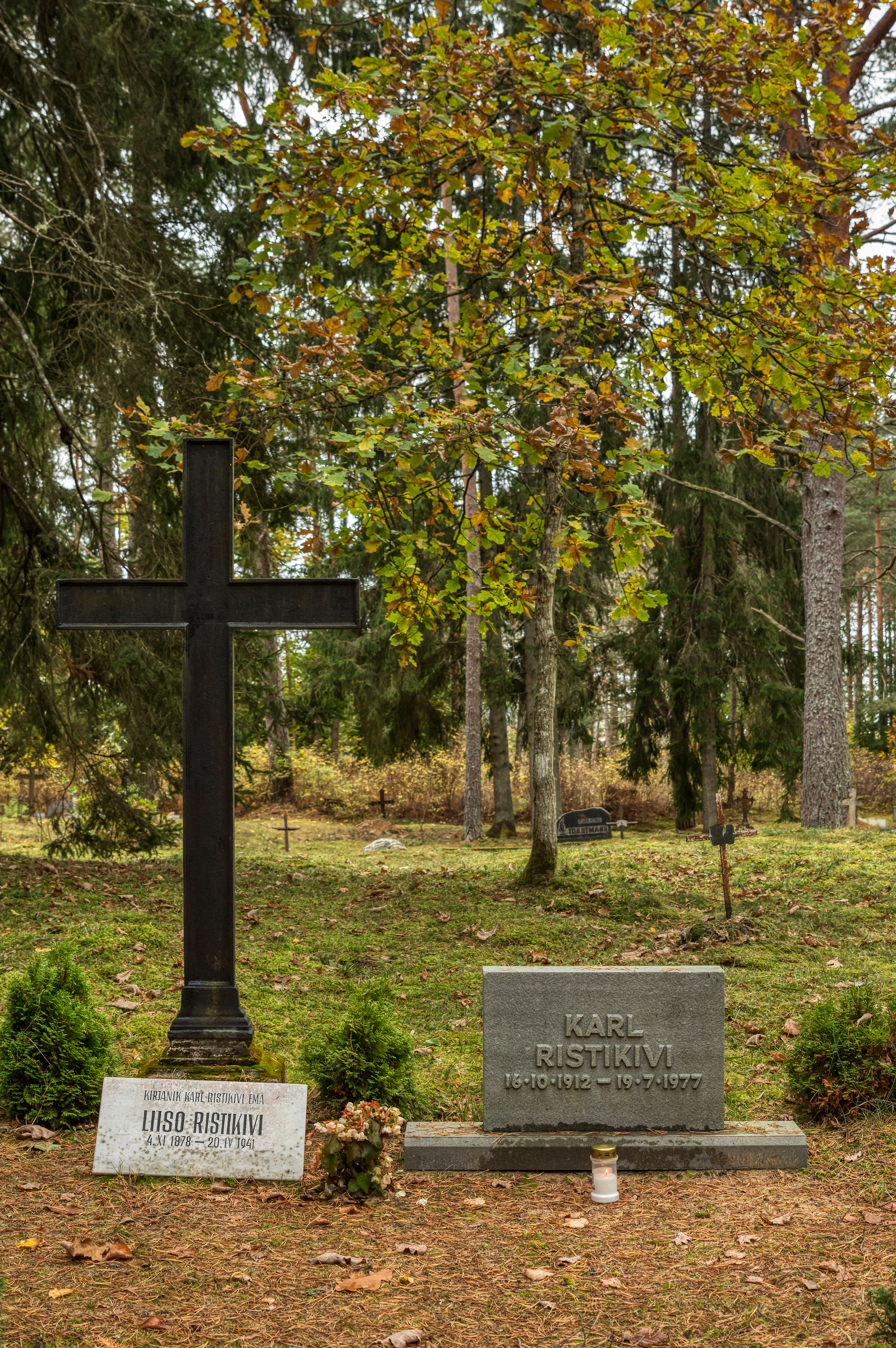
The graves of Karl Ristikivi and his mother in Paadrema, Estonia

Karl Ristikivi was born on 16 October 1912 in Varbla in western Estonia to an unmarried maidservant, Liiso Ristikivi, and was baptized Karp Ristikivi in the Eastern Orthodox congregation to which his mother belonged. He spent his childhood on various farms where his mother found employment. In 1920, Ristikivi began studying at a local primary school where he would suffer from humiliation because of his illegitimacy and frail physique.

He obtained some knowledge of literature and history by reading old German books that he found in the attic of a local manor house; although he did not know the language at first, he enjoyed looking at the pictures and asked grown-ups about the meaning of the texts. In the process he shaped his own imaginary world of medieval knights and Christian ideals.

His interest in history and talent for learning languages made Ristikivi an academic success at the village school. In 1927, a rich relative offered an opportunity to continue his studies, and Ristikivi then attended the Tallinn Commercial School and the Tallinn College; he graduated from the latter in 1932. The reminiscences of older residents of the city sparked Ristikivi's interest in the first period of urbanization in Estonia at the end of the nineteenth century.

Ristikivi began his literary career writing stories for family magazines, and in the 1930s he published a series of children's books with animal characters: The Flying World ("Lendav maailm", 1935), The Blue Butterfly ("Sinine liblikas", 1936), Pals ("Semud", 1936), and Chums ("Sellid", 1938). The money he received for these works enabled him to enroll in the department of geography in the faculty of mathematics and natural sciences of the University of Tartu in 1936, where he chose sociology as his main subject.

While at the university he was active in the left-wing Estonian Students' Society Veljesto. Ristikivi graduated Tartu University cum laude in 1941.

== Later life in Swedish exile ==
Much of this section is based on the only longer book dealing with Karl Ristikivi's life, i.e. Nirk, op. cit.

The Nazi-German occupation of Estonia in 1941 formed a watershed in Karl Ristikivi's life. Ristikivi was mobilised into the German army. As the German occupation weakened, Estonians began to worry what would happen if the Russians returned. For those who had been mobilised into the German army, risked deportation to the GULAG or being executed in the event of the Soviet Russian troops reoccupying Estonia. Ristikivi ended up working in the Estonian Bureau in Helsinki, capital of neighbouring Finland. But at some point during 1944, Ristikivi decided to cross over to neutral Sweden, quite legally as he even obtained a visa. But he would never see Estonia again. He would live for the rest of his life, a further 33 years, in the Stockholm area and Uppsala.

Ristikivi began writing articles for the exile Estonian press in Sweden. But in the end, to make ends meet, he started work at a health insurance office. This meant that all his writing from then onwards would have to be done in his spare time. The first two novels he wrote in exile were those of the Unfinished Trilogy. These were still about Estonia, but by the early 1950s, Ristikivi must have undergone some kind of crisis. He did not complete the trilogy but instead started work on what has become his most famous novel The Night of Souls ("Hingede öö"; 1953; synopsis below).

Around the time that Ristikivi was writing his historical novel about Saint Catherine of Siena (The Bridal Veil op. cit.), he was interviewed by Vello Salo for Vatican Radio about his previous work. But he appears not to have been a very public figure, devoting much of his spare time to writing his novels and other works, and mostly mixing with other exile Estonians in his social life. Nevertheless, Ristikivi travelled quite a lot, often to southern Europe to look at some of the settings for his later novels.

Apart from writing the other novels described in the synopses section below, Ristikivi continued to write many reviews and critical essays, mostly about Estonian literature, for the exile Estonian press and helped his friend Bernard Kangro, also a poet and novelist to run the publishing house Estonian Writers' Co-operative, housed in a suburb of Lund in southern Sweden, and which published exile Estonian literature.

Apart from two translations of his early novels into Finnish, a couple of his short-stories in Swedish, and a few recent Russian translations of his key novels, Karl Ristikívi remains untranslated into any other language.

Karl Ristikivi is estimated to have died on 19 July 1977 in his flat on Östervägen, Solna, near Stockholm, Sweden. His body was found a little while later and he is assumed to have died instantly of a brain haemorrhage. He was buried in Stockholm a few days later. A monument to Karl Ristikivi was unveiled at his birthplace in Estonia to commemorate what would have been his 75th birthday in 1987. In Sweden, Karl Ristikivi was buried in the Orthodox part of the Skogskyrkogården cemetery. On 15 September 2017, an urn with Karl Ristikivi's ashes reached the Estonian Writers' Union. It was buried on 28 October 2017 on Paadrema cemetery.

== The trilogies, novels, and short-stories – synopses and descriptions ==
A large part of what is written in this section is drawn from Neithal (op. cit.) and occasionally Nirk (op. cit.) There are simply no English-language sources or, for that matter, Swedish-language ones, although Ristikivi spent that last 33 years of his life living in Sweden.

The Tallinn Trilogy - Fire and Iron ("Tuli ja raud"; 1938); The Abode of a Righteous Man / In a Strange House ("Õige mehe koda" / "Võõras majas"; 1940); The Herb Garden ("Rohtaed"; 1942)

In 1938 Ristikivi published his first novel, Fire and Iron. It and his next two novels treat the urbanization process as it affected three representative classes of Estonians — workers, merchants, and intellectuals — and comprise what is termed his Tallinn trilogy.

Fire and Iron begins in the 1880s with Jüri Säävel giving up farming and moving to Tallinn, thereby becoming a member of the first urban proletariat in Estonia. He witnesses the revolution of 1905, World War I, the Estonian declaration of independence in 1918, and the subsequent War of Independence. Throughout his life he retains his ideals of hard work, honesty, and charity. One of his sons dies in an accident; the other son, continuing the family tradition of moving to places of economic opportunity, seeks his fortune by immigrating to the United States. Säävel sends his orphaned grandson to the newly founded Tallinn Technical University, thereby establishing a pattern of progress: Säävel is a foundry worker, his late son was a train engineer, and the grandson gets a degree in engineering.

A reverse pattern is also apparent, however: the grandson divorces his wife, leaving her with a baby son. Säävel dies without forgiving his grandson, but the rest of the family continues living together to bring up the child.

Fire and Iron was the literary event of the year and won first prize in the fiction competition of the publishing house Loodus. The award money enabled Ristikivi to continue his studies; even more important to the young novelist was a public letter of praise from A. H. Tammsaare, the "living classic" of Estonian literature. Tammsaare's words of encouragement suggest that the older writer was aware of Ristikivi's debt to Tammsaare's epic novel cycle Truth and Justice ("Tõde ja õigus", 1926–1933). Other influences on Ristikivi's Tallinn trilogy were the novels of Charles Dickens, John Galsworthy, and Thomas Mann and — oddly — the 1933 Hollywood movie Cavalcade.

In June 1940 the Soviet army invaded and occupied Estonia. One of the consequences of the Communist occupation was that when the next novel in Ristikivi's trilogy was published in December 1940, its title was changed by the authorities from the author's The Abode of a Righteous Man to In a Strange House because the original title was thought to be too biblical.

In In a Strange House Jakob Kadarik, an orphan, is brought up in the household of a rich German merchant who owns a department store in a choice location in Tallinn. Jakob is ashamed of his peasant origin and obsessed with getting ahead. To reward his doggedly faithful service, humility, and business acumen, the merchant gives Jacob the hand of one of his daughters, who would otherwise remain an old maid. Another daughter, however, will get a much bigger dowry, so Jakob engages in an intrigue whereby he gets the other sister to marry him. Decades later, life in the Kadarik household is outwardly splendid: Estonia is an independent republic; Estonians have replaced Baltic Germans in business and society; and Jacob now owns the department store. Real happiness eludes Jakob, however. His wife has not forgiven him for the greedy and fraudulent maneuver that led to their union and has never loved him. Then the business fails. After the wife dies, the children find her diary, which reveals the ugly truth about her marriage; as a result, they become estranged from their father. Jakob's store burns down; he is suspected of having set the fire to collect the insurance; and one of his sons commits suicide.

The protagonist of the third novel The Herb Garden, Juulius Kilimit, is the son of a village schoolmaster, lives in something of an aestheticist fantasy world of his own. He flees in his mind to an folkloric idyll, taking his urge towards freedom from German and Greek classics. But his god is not to be found in the groves of Arcadia, but in the landscape of Estonia, where he seeks his roots. While the Estonian literature of the time often portrayed the intellectual with some ridicule, Ristikivi picks his ideals from a symbolic herb garden. The younger generation try to undermine such feelings. The author allows romantic and positive values to prevail, as the novel had been planned before the Soviet and Nazi invasions of his homeland.

The Unfinished Trilogy - All That Ever Was ("Kõik, mis kunagi oli"; 1946); Nothing Happened ("Ei juhtunud midagi"; 1947)

Also sketched out while Ristikivi was still living in Estonia were the two novels of the Unfinished Trilogy, which appeared in Swedish exile in 1946 and 1947, respectively. These are the last novels that Ristikivi wrote that are set in and examine Estonia.

The first of the two novels, All That Ever Was, presents a nostalgic view of Estonia, from the perspective of an elderly clergyman, August Tammik. The second novel, the ironically-titled Nothing Happened, explores the reality of the Soviet occupation of Estonia and the establishment there of Soviet military bases, alongside the mass exodus of the Baltic-Germans.

The Night of Souls ("Hingede öö"; 1953)

This novel is regarded as Ristikivi's masterpiece. It is a novel dealing with the very personal alienation and existential crisis experienced by a foreigner in a strange land. Ristikivi himself was now in exile in Sweden with no hope of ever returning to Estonia. The space in which the novel moves is a building in central Stockholm which the protagonist enters on New Year's Eve, hoping to flee the noisy drunken crowds on the streets, but also to attend a concert. But he ends up wandering up and down this labyrinthine house, meeting people, having desultory conversations, and never fully fitting in or getting into close contact with anyone. The epigrams at the beginning of chapters are taken from, for instance, John Bunyan, Walt Whitman, T.S. Eliot, Edgar Allan Poe, Christian Morgenstern, Lewis Carroll, A.E. Housman, Oscar Wilde, and the Finnish poet Uuno Kailas, which is a hint at what Ristikivi was reading at the time. The second half of the novel, entitled The Seven Witnesses begins with a strange waiting room scene where the protagonist appears to be in limbo between two countries, unable to proceed, unable to return. This is followed by a dreamlike court scene which is similar to the one that the old academic, Dr Isak Borg, experiences in the Ingmar Bergman film Wild Strawberries (1957). Each witness represents one of the Seven Deadly Sins. Between these two sections is a letter to a certain Mrs Agnes Rohumaa, which brings the reader down to earth, out of the dreams for a while. The novel ends on a relatively optimistic note. The protagonist is hardly reborn, but a number of matters have become clearer.

Ristikivi has documented some of the impulses that led to this novel. The first germ of an idea occurred when he was walking home alone one New Year's Eve through the almost empty streets of Uppsala, Sweden, in the mid-1940s. He then conceived of a short-story (which was never written) where a young man enters a completely unknown building, and it is not the people in there that are embarrassed at the fact that he is a stranger, but the young man himself. This idea gelled when Ristikivi celebrated the New Year at the Stockholm Concert Hall some years later. There are also musical and literary references in Ristikivi's description of the genesis of this novel such as Beethoven's 7th Symphony, Gide's Counterfeiters, and T.S. Eliot's Cocktail Party. But Ristikivi claims he had, at the time, not yet read Kafka.

The Chronicle Trilogy - The Burning Flag ("Põlev lipp"; 1961); The Last Bastion ("Viimne linn"; 1962); The Horsemen of Death ("Surma ratsanikud"; 1963)

Ristikivi changed his style completely for this trilogy whose novels are set during the period of the Crusades between 1266 and 1311. Where the previous novel was an intimate account, these three are written in a somewhat impersonal chronicle style.

The Burning Flag describes the life of the young German count Konrad von Hohenstaufen and his attempts to regain control of the Kingdom of Sicily which had once been ruled by his forebears, but his forces suffer defeat and he is killed.

The Last Bastion describes the attempts by Christians to take Acre (also known as Akka or Akkon), and the dramatic events, full of sacrifice, that took place in the Palestine of 1291.

In The Horsemen of Death the Crusades as such have just finished but the Occident still launches raids including the exploits of the notorious Catalan Company, i.e. the Knights of Death, who enjoyed victories in Asia Minor in 1302 and 1311.

The Isle of Miracles ("Imede saar"; 1964)

This short novel forms an interlude in Ristikivi's production. It is an allegory, based in part on the works of famous utopian authors such as Thomas More and Tommaso Campanella, and especially the Platonic idea of a good society. The utopia is an archipelago called Allotria, which has features of our modern Western society. Mankind has here become a victim of its own freedom. The book is therefore an anti-utopian work. Allotria is pitted against the Heliodorian realm that is the remains of a former tyranny and is hidden within the crater of a volcano. This is an aggressive nation and Allotria, a welfare state, ignores its threatening behaviour. The book is thus an allegorical examination of how democracies and totalitarian countries interact. How egotistical can democracies be, or should perhaps they be led by idealists who demand a certain degree of national sacrifice? The allegory is written in the form of a voyage in 1348 to Allotria. It is altogether lighter in tone than the previous historical trilogy.

The Biographical Trilogy - The Bridal Veil ("Mõrsjalinik"; 1965); The Song of Joy ("Rõõmulaul"; 1966); The Apprentice to Sorcery ("Nõiduse õpilane"; 1967)

The Bridal Veil is the story of Catarina Benincasa (1347-1380) better known as Saint Catherine of Siena. Ristikivi steers clear of the central mystical part of her life, instead focusing on her via dolorosa to achieve sainthood in this life. As a woman and an idealist in a rough man's world, she is often treated with suspicion. She hopes to conquer the evils of this world by moral means. The novel describes her personal struggle, but also the political ones in 14th century Italy. Each chapter is divided into two parts. The first part is more like a chronicle, the second is the personal view of someone who knew Catherine. Christian ideals and existential problems are dealt with in this novel.

The second novel of this trilogy, The Song of Joy tells the story of the mediaeval Welsh bard and composer David and asks the question whether the evils of this world can be countered by music. The title alludes to Ode to Joy i.e. Schiller and Beethoven. But David's music appears not to improve this world in any way, because as he grows more accomplished, the world around him grows more evil. A key theme is the road of any person through life, and to what extent it is possible for this world to be improved by the acts of individuals. It is also about turning the other cheek.

The Apprentice to Sorcery, the third novel, is about the mediaeval thinker and physician Johannes Faber, a scientist in the spirit of Faust. He finds himself caught between the exigencies of science and church dogma. The action of the novel takes place during the last three days of Johannes Faber's life while he tell the Domican priest Anselm everything about his life as he awaits being burnt at the stake. This novel is an elegy, but intellectual joy shines through.

The Gates of Sigtuna ("Sigtuna väravad"; 1968) (short prose)

This book consists of ten short-stories with titles such as The Philosopher Who Did Not Learn How to Keep Silent, Creator of One's Own Joy, Don Juan and the Virgin Johanna. Ristikivi is again examining moral paradoxes and dilemmas. The Don Juan story is where he meets Joan of Arc, perhaps in heaven, and they have their dialogue.

The Last Trilogy - Noble Hearts or Two Friends in Florence ("Õilsad südamed ehk kaks sõpra Firenzes"; 1970); Dragon's Teeth ("Lohe hambad"; 1970); A Double Game ("Kahekordne mäng"; 1972)

As the critic Reet Neithal puts it (op. cit.) Ristikivi both develops and sums up his oeuvre in this, his last, trilogy.

The first novel, Noble Hearts or Two Friends in Florence has a rather complex structure and is set in the London of the 1960s in the theatre world where a play set in Cromwellian England in the 1640s is being staged. This play in turn describes the life and death of Savonarola in Florence in 1398. Ristikivi uses this book to examine the politics of his day by way of analogy. history repeats itself. Friendships are hollow, and people are scheming all the time. There are also short scenes from the play that Ristikivi has himself made up. The narrator even makes a little topical joke on page 10 of this novel, when referring to the author of the play, Richard Cliff, that "a certain Mr Cliff Richard" may have borrowed his pseudonym from him.

The second novel, Dragon's Teeth is set in the Spain and Low Countries of the 16th century, as well as describing the life of a Catalan refugee in Paris in 1949, Joaquim Barrera, whose son Pablo is translating and commenting on his father's trilogy. The structure is therefore a novel within a novel. In the trilogy, there are two main characters, the idealist Ruy Pons de Granollers is described in the light of political goals and pointless sacrifice, and a more down to earth Fleming, Jan Bleis. This is to an extent a metanovel about the philosophy of history from a pessimistic point of view.

The third novel, A Double Game is once again an examination of history and morality, but in the form of a murder mystery. Some of the detective work has to be done by the reader.

A Rome Diary ("Rooma päevik"; 1976)

Ristikivi's last book is set in the 18th century Rome, among the ruins and historical buildings. It was published one year before the author's death. As critic Reet Neithal describes the book as: "[Ristikivi's] swan song, a finely textured and poetic travelogue that does not so much describe the travel venues – the famous monuments of Rome - as the mood of the protagonist and his actions as a result of these. This subtle spiritual diary is one of the author's most personal works". The protagonist (i.e. author of the diary) is called Kaspar von Schmerzburg ("Schmerz" being the German for pain). He walks among the ruins of what was once a huge empire - i.e. the Roman one. He walks in the catacombs and tunnels, and thus sees what is hidden as well as easily viewed from the street. Ristikivi shows his more melancholy and pessimistic side.

== Bibliography ==
=== Novels in chronological order ===
- Tuli ja raud (Fire and Iron, 1938)
- Õige mehe koda (The Abode of a Righteous Man, 1940)
- Rohtaed (The Herb Garden, 1942)
- Kõik mis kunagi oli (All That Ever Was, 1946)
- Ei juhtunud midagi (Nothing Happened, 1947)
- Hingede öö (The Night of Souls, 1953)
- Põlev lipp (The Burning Flag, 1961)
- Viimne linn (The Last Bastion, 1962)
- Surma ratsanikud (The Horsemen of Death, 1963)
- Imede saar (The Isle of Wonders, 1964)
- Mõrsjalinik (The Bridal Veil, 1965)
- Rõõmulaul (The Song of Joy, 1966)
- Nõiduse õpilane (The Apprentice to Sorcery, 1967)
- Õilsad südamed (Noble Hearts, 1970)
- Lohe hambad (Dragon's Teeth, 1970)
- Kahekordne mäng (A Double Game, 1972)
- Rooma päevik (A Rome Diary, 1976)

=== Collections of short prose ===
- Sigtuna väravad (The Gates of Sigtuna, 1968)
- Klaassilmadega Kristus (Christ with Eyes of Glass, 1980)

=== Other publications ===
- Semud (Pals; children's book about puppies), Tallinn, 1936.
- Sellid (Chums; children's book about kittens), Tallinn, 1938.
- Eesti kirjanduse lugu (History of Estonian Literature; monograph), Tõrvik (publisher), Vadstena, Sweden, 1954, 136 pages.
- Bernard Kangro (biography of the author), Estonian Writers' Co-operative (publisher), Lund, Sweden, 1967, 80 pages.
- Inimese teekond (A Journey of a Man; collected poems), Estonian Writers' Co-operative (publisher), Lund, Sweden, 1972, reprint Eesti Raamat (publisher), Tallinn, 1990, 76 pages.
- Kirjad romaanist (Letters About the Novel; correspondence with Bernard Kangro about the novel), Estonian Writers' Co-operative (publisher), Lund, Sweden, 1985, 80 pages.
- Hurmakägu on surma nägu (The Enchanting Cuckoo is the Face of Death; crime novel written in Swedish under the pseudonym of Christian Steen, translated into Estonian by Jaan Kross), Kupar (publisher), Tallinn, 1992, 190 pages.
- Viimne vabadus (The Last Freedom, collection of essays), editor Janika Kronberg, Ilmamaa (publisher), Tartu, 1996, 544 pages.
- Päevaraamat (1957–1968) (Diary, 1957-1968; diaries), editor Janika Kronberg, Varrak (publisher), Tallinn, 2008, 1,112 pages.

=== Biographies and reference works about Karl Ristikivi (in Estonian) ===
There are, as yet, no book-length reference works or longer articles about the life and works of Karl Ristikivi in any other language but Estonian. These are what are available:

- Arvo Mägi: Karl Ristikivi (idem), Estonian Writers' Co-operative, Lund, Sweden, 1962, 64 pages.
- Endel Nirk: Teeline ja tähed (Wayfarer and Stars), Eesti Raamat (publisher), Tallinn, 1991, 288 pages.
- Reet Neithal: Karl Ristikivi - arengulooline essee (Karl Ristikivi - his development as an author), Koolibri, Tallinn, 1994, 72 pages.
- Karl Ristikivi 75. A two volume series of 24 essays, published for what would have been Ristikivi's 75th birthday, Estonian Writers' Union (publisher), Tallinn, 1988, 230 pages in total.
- Karl Ristikivi - Personaalnimestik (Karl Ristikivi - Bibliography), Eesti TA Raamatukogu (publisher), Tallinn, 1992, 138 pages.
- Eesti kirjanike leksikon (Estonian Dictionary of Authors), Eesti Raamat (publisher), 2000, entry for Karl Ristikivi pages 268–270.
