= Arvo Mägi =

Estonian writer and journalist (1913–2004)

- Born: June 13, 1913; Kooza, Governorate of Livonia, Russian Empire (now Koosa, Estonia)
- Died: November 27, 2004 (aged 91); Nacka Municipality, Sweden
- Resting place: Skogskyrkogården, Stockholm, Sweden
- Occupations: Writer and journalist

Arvo Mägi (pseudonym Juhan Timmukuru; June 13, 1913 – November 27, 2004) was an Estonian writer and journalist.

== Early life and education ==
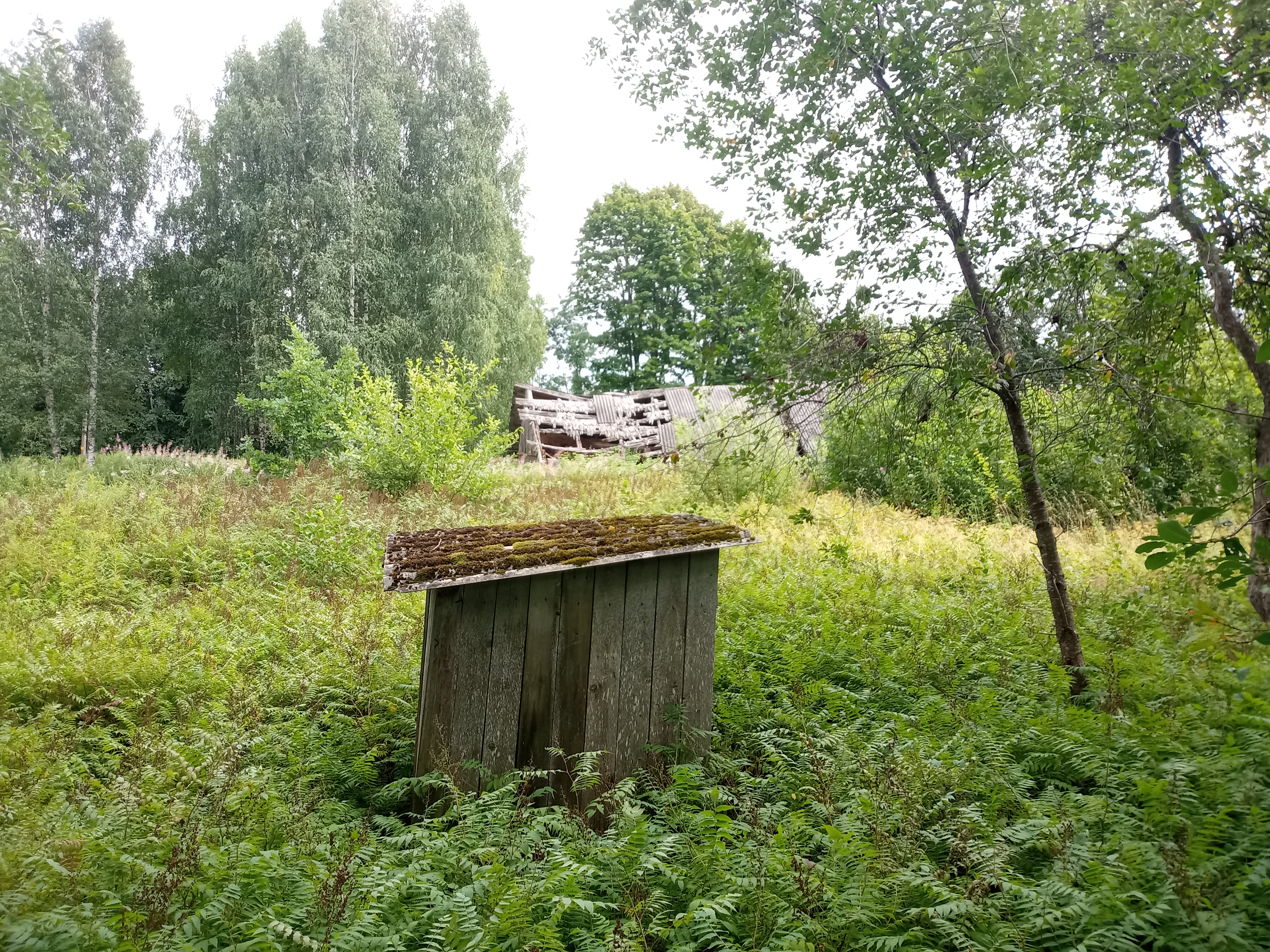
The Lõhmuse Farm, the birthplace of Arvo Mägi (in 2024)

Arvo Mägi was born in the village of Koosa, Estonia, the son of Juhan Mägi (1870–1942) and Ida Alexandra Margaretha Mägi (née Schulzenberg, 1872–1949). He graduated from Hugo Treffner High School in 1931. He studied at the Faculty of Philosophy of the University of Tartu from 1932 to 1939, when he graduated cum laude and defended his master's thesis. He also studied at the Faculty of Law of the University of Tartu and the University of Helsinki in 1939. Academically, he became a member of Fraternitas Liviensis in 1933, and he became an honorary alumnus in 1992.

== Career ==
From 1939 to 1941, Mägi worked at the Estonian National Museum, and from 1941 to 1943, he was a journalist for the newspaper Postimees.

In 1943, he went to Finland, where he was the editor of the newspaper Malevlane and the Estonian-language broadcasts of the Finnish Broadcasting Company.

In 1944, he fled to Sweden, where he worked as a draftsman, modeler, and photo lab technician from 1944 to 1952, and as a freelance writer from 1952 onward. From 1945 to 1947, he was a member of the editorial board of the magazine Vabariiklane, and from 1973 to 1980 he was a member of the editorial board of the Sweden-based Estonian newspaper Eesti Päevaleht.

== Works ==
- Hõbedane noorus (Silver Youth, 1949)
- Ringid vees (Circles in the Water, 1952)
- Esimesed read (The First Lines, 1953, as Juhan Timmukuru)
- Peep Koordipoja põlistalu (Peep Koordipoeg's Ancestral Farm, 1953, as Juhan Timmukuru)
- Uputus (The Flood, 1954)
- Ei lasta elada (Not Letting Go, 1956)
- Kiusaja (The Bully, 1958)
- Paradiisi väravad (The Gates of Paradise, 1960)
- Karneval (Carnival, 1962)
- Regivärsid (Alliterative Verses, 1963)
- Tants hämarusse (Dance into Twilight, 1964)
- Neli emandat (Four Ladies, 1966)
- Tuuleveski (The Windmill, 1967)
- Taalrimäng (The Thaler Game, 1968)
- Risti riik. Karvikute kroonikat 1 (The Land of the Cross: The Karvik Chronicle 1, 1970)
- Uued isandad. Karvikute kroonikat 2 (New Masters: The Karvik Chronicle 2, 1971)
- Õigus hõlma all. Karvikute kroonikat 3 (Law under the Tribe: The Karvik Chronicle 3, 1972)
- Lippude vahetus. Karvikute kroonikat 4 (Change of Flags: The Karvik Chronicle 4, 1973)
- Epiloog (Epilogue, 1977)
- Eesti rahva ajaraamat (Chronicle of the Estonian People, 1979)
- Kolm koda (Three Chambers, 1980)
- Liivimaa jutud (Tales of Livonia, 1983)
- Euroopa rahvaste ajaraamat (Chronicle of the European Peoples, 1984)
- Hingede helin (The Ring of Souls, 1985)
- Aeg kirju ei kuluta (Books Do Not Fade with Time, 1986)
- Nigulapäev (St. Nicholas Day, 1988)
- Suvitusromaan (Summer Novel, 1991)
- Teine tera (Something Different, 1998)
- Pärast pidu (After the Party, 2000)
- Mis meelde on jäänud (What I Remember, 2001)
- Katk ja koolera (Plague and Cholera, 2003)

== Memberships ==
- Member of the board of the Estonian Writers' Cooperative
- Secretary of the Estonian Writers' Association Abroad
- Member of PEN International
- 1966–1972: Member of the Estonian Committee's Board of Deputies: elected in 1966, 1968, and 1970
- 1979–1982: Member of the 7th Board of Representatives of the Estonian Representation in Sweden

== Awards and recognitions ==
- 1998: Order of the National Coat of Arms, 4th Class
