= Sellest mustast mungast =

1957 novel by Gert Helbemäe

- Author: Gert Helbemäe
- Language: Estonian
- Publication date: 1957
- Publication place: Estonia

Sellest mustast mungast is a novel by Estonian author Gert Helbemäe. It was first published in 1957.
