= Mõrsjalinik =

1965 novel by Karl Ristikivi

- Cover of 1992 published version.
- Author: Karl Ristikivi
- Language: Estonian
- Series: Trilogy of biographies
- Publisher: Eesti Kirjanike Kooperatiiv
- Publication date: 1965
- Publication place: Sweden
- Pages: 303
- ISBN: 5-450-01518-6
- Followed by: Rõõmulaul

Mõrsjalinik (English: The Bridal Veil) is a novel by Estonian author Karl Ristikivi. It was first published in 1965 in Lund, Sweden by Eesti Kirjanike Kooperatiiv (Estonian Writers' Cooperative). In Estonia, it was published in 1992.
