= Janika Kronberg =

Estonian literary scientist and critic

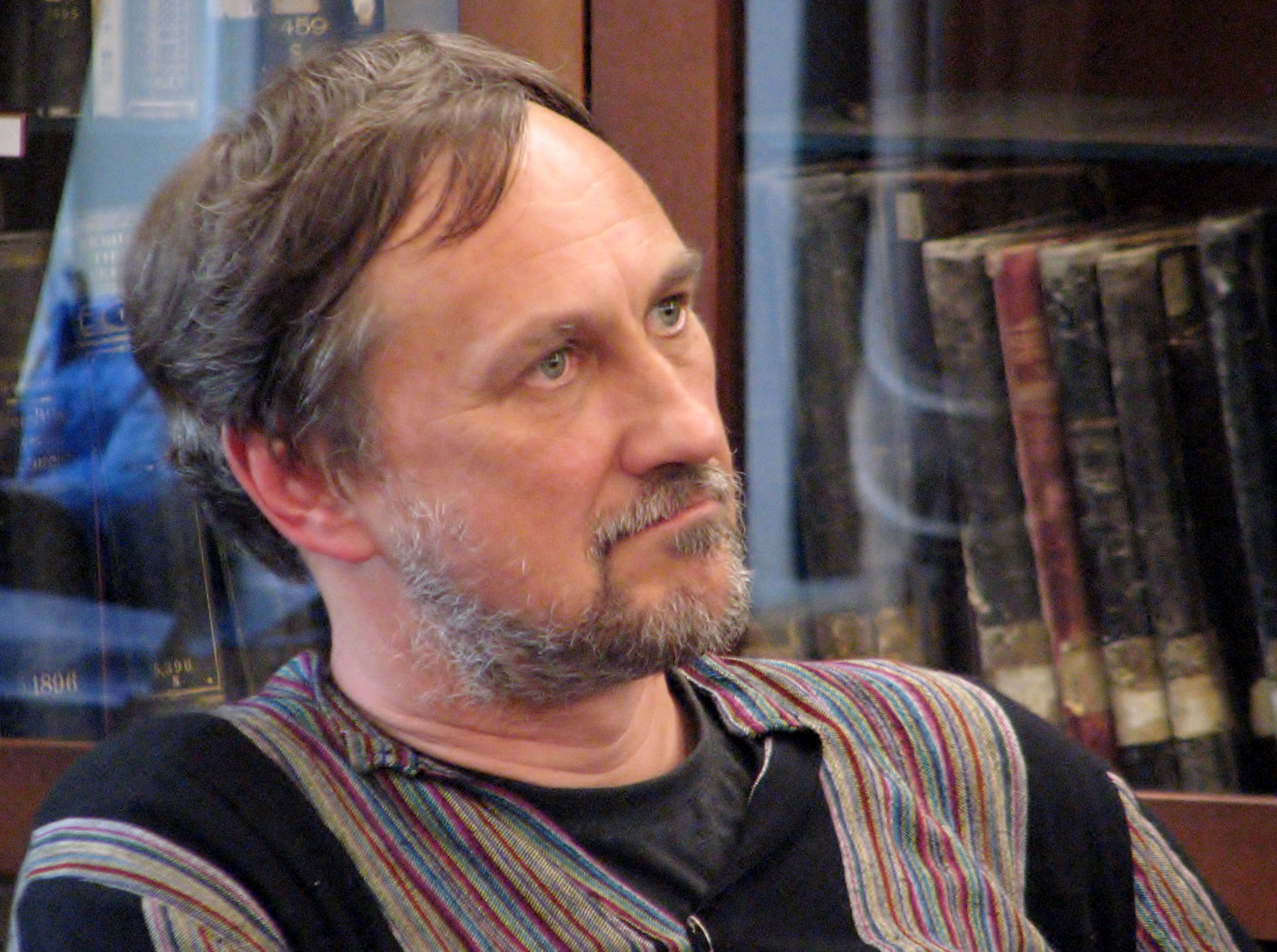
Janika Kronberg

Janika Kronberg (born 24 November 1963 in Võru) is an Estonian literary scientist and critic.

Kronberg graduated from Võru Secondary School No. 1 in 1981 (now, the Võru Kreutzwald Gymnasium) and from the Faculty of Philology of Tartu State University in 1989, majoring in Estonian language and literature.

From 1989 until 1996, he was the head of Karl Ristikivi Museum. He is the chairman of Karl Ristikivi Society. From 2005 until 2015, he was the head of Estonian Literary Museum. Since 2016 he is the chief editor of the magazine Looming.

Topics of research include Karl Ristikivi and his legacy; he has also done a lot of research related to Karl Ast, Friedebert Tuglas, Eduard Vilde, Henrik Visnapuu and Ivar Grünthal.

== Awards ==
- 2014: Bernard Kangro Literary Award
- 2015: Order of the White Star, IV class.

== Works ==
- "Tiibhobu märgi all. Eesti Kirjanike Kooperatiiv 1950–1994". Series: Collegium litterarum nr 13, Underi ja Tuglase Kirjanduskeskus, Tallinn 2002, 288 pp; ISBN 9985865111
- "Rännud kuue teejuhiga". Edited by Brita Melts. Series: Go reisiraamat, Go Group, Tallinn 2013, 248 pp; ISBN 9789949941841
- "Hästi valitud sõbrad. Artikleid Karl Ristikivist ja tema kirjanduslikust ümbrusest". Series: EKLA töid kirjandusest ja kultuuriloost, nr 9, Eesti Kirjandusmuuseumi Teaduskirjastus ja Karl Ristikivi Selts, Tartu 2016, 233 pp; ISBN 9789949586141
