= Gert Helbemäe =

Estonian writer and journalist (1913–1974)

Gert Helbemäe (birth name Gert-Joachim Einborn; 10 November 1913 Tallinn – 15 July 1974 London) was an Estonian writer and journalist. He is known mainly for his historical novels and short stories.

From 1921 to 1933 he studied in Tallinn French Lyceum.

In 1930s he was an executive editor for several newspapers and magazines: Eesti Pildileht, Roheline Post, and Film ja Elu.

In 1944, he fled to Lübeck in Germany. In 1947 he moved to London, and he applied for naturalization in 1952. In London, he issued the newspaper Eesti Hääl, and from 1960 he was also its editor. He also belonged to the board of the Estonian Writers' Cooperative.

He kept pet chipmunks, which are featured in his 1968 work Minni ja Miku: Kaks vöötoravat (published in English as A Chipmunk on my Shoulder).

He is buried at Gunnersbury Cemetery in Kensington.

== Works ==
- 1947: short story collection Vaikija (The Silent One)
- 1955: novel Õekesed (The Little Sisters)
- 1957–1958: novel Sellest mustast mungast I and II (About that Black Monk, I and II)
- 1960: novel Ohvrilaev (The Ship to Delos)
- 1968: Minni ja Miku: Kaks vöötoravat (published in English as A Chipmunk on my Shoulder)
