= Vello Salo =

Estonian cleric, essayist, and translator (1925–2019)

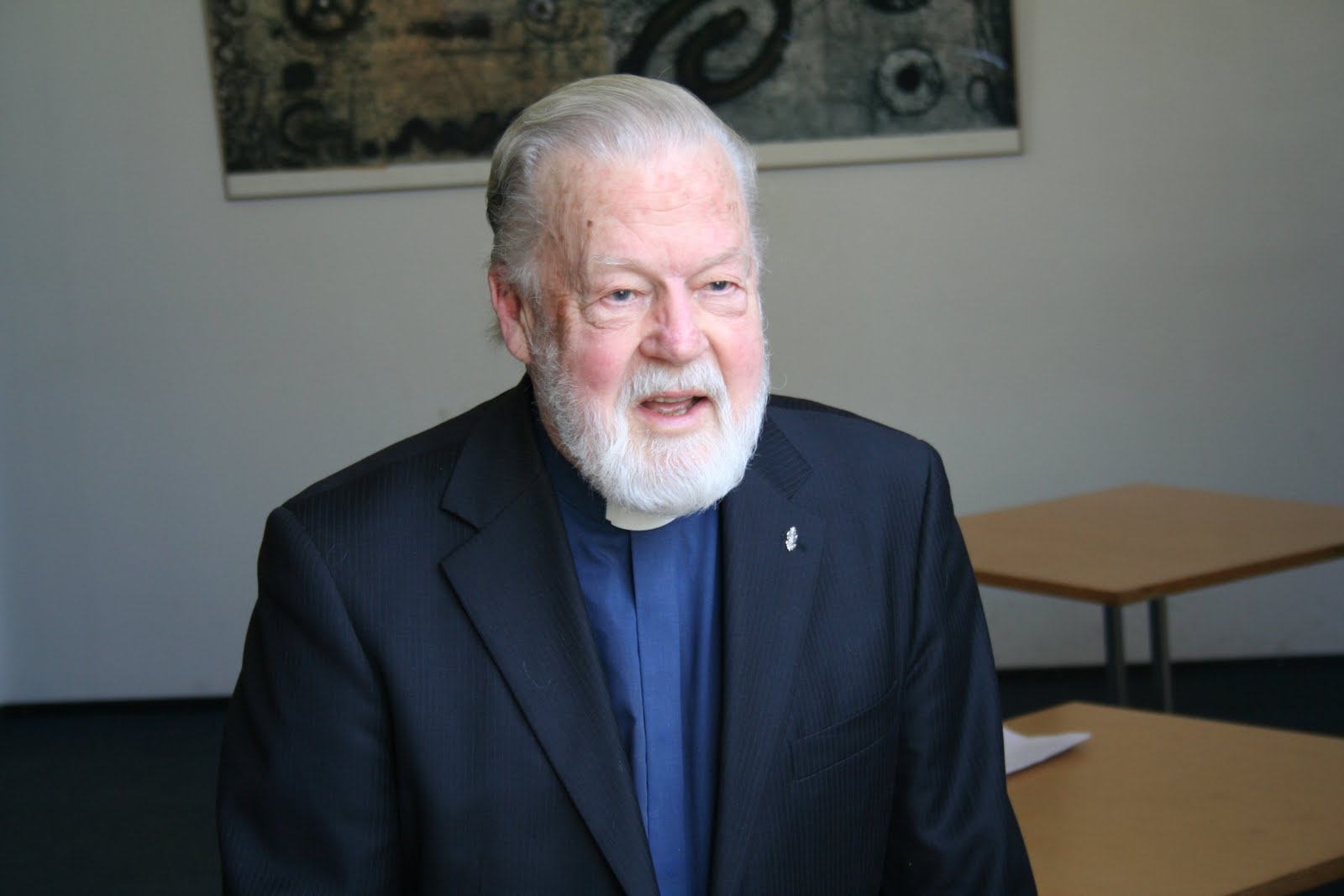
Vello Salo

Vello Salo (until 1945 Endel Vaher; 5 November 1925 Võisiku Parish, Viljandi County – 21 April 2019 Tallinn) was an Estonian Catholic cleric, essayist, translator. He was a notable promoter of Estonian literature in exile. He was a Catholic.

During WW II, he joined with Finnish Infantry Regiment 200.

In 1962, he established Estonian exile publishing house Maarjamaa.

Since 1998, he was a member of Estonian Writers' Union.

Since 2001, he was a priest for Pirita Monastery.

In 2018, the documentary film was made about Salo's life. The film was titled as "Igapäevelu müstika" ('Vello Salo: The Mystery of Everyday Life'), directed by Jaan Tootsen.

He was honorary alumnus of the Estonian Students' Society.

On September 25, 2018, he met Pope Francis in Tallinn during his Apostolic Visit to Estonia.
