= Eesti mõttelugu =

Estonian book series

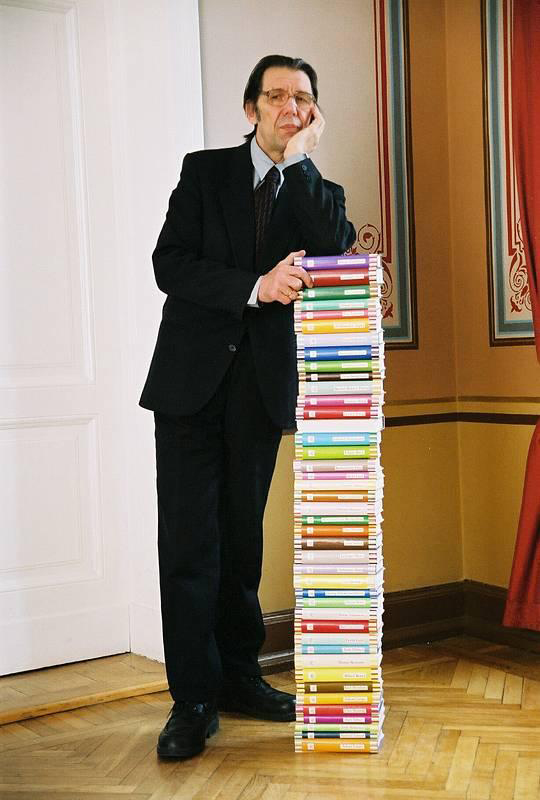
The editor-in-chief Hando Runnel with the book series "Eesti mõttelugu" in 2002

Eesti mõttelugu (Estonian for The Story of Estonian Thought) is a book series of essay collections by Estonian historical thinkers, published by Ilmamaa since 1994. The editor-in-chief and publisher is the Estonian poet Hando Runnel. According to Postimees, Estonia's highest-circulation newspaper, the series has become an institution. As of 2012, 108 volumes had been published. By April 2018, the number of volumes had risen to 139. In 2018, the Estonian Academy of Sciences marked its 80th anniversary with a conference bearing the same name, focused on the book series and its importance and influence.
