= List of publishing companies of Estonia =

This is a list of publishing companies of Estonia. The list is incomplete.

Name	Foundation year	Location (city)	Further info
Absurdum Art	2005-2010		Issued three books
Ajakirjade Kirjastus			
AS Äripäev			
Big Details	2024		located in Tallinn
Boreas	1939-		oldest Estonian publishing companies outside Estonia
Eesti Kirjanike Kooperatiiv			
Eesti Päevalehe Kirjastus			
Eesti Raamat			
Elmatar	1990s-2015		located in Tartu
Estonian Communist Party Central Committee Publishing House	1963		located in Tallinn
Estonian Encyclopaedia Publishers			Defunct in 2011
Hea Lugu			
Ilmamaa	1993	Tartu	Issued Eesti mõttelugu
Ilukirjandus ja Kunst	1940-1949	Tartu/Tallinn	
Kentaur			
Koolibri	1991		published mainly educational literature
Kultuurileht Foundation	1999		
Legend Kirjastus			
Loodus			
Loodusajakiri			
Maarjamaa	1962-		in exile, founded by Vello Salo
Noor-Eesti	1904–1940		
Nordic Press			in exile, USA
Noria Books			in USA, to publish works by Estonian writers
Olion	1989-2013		
Oma Press			outside Estonia
Orto			outside Estonia
Pegasus	2001-		
Perioodika			
Postimees Kirjastus			
Publishing House ERSEN			
Raudwara			
SE&JS	1992-		
Steamark	1997		
Tallinn Estonian Publishing Company	1908–1940		in Tallinn
Tammerraamat			
Tänapäev			
Tartu Eesti Kirjastus	1940s		in Tartu
Teaduslik Kirjandus	1940–1941 and 1944–1949		in Tartu
Ühinenud Ajakirjad	1998-		
Vaba Eesti	1954-1975		outside Estonia
Varrak			
