= Sant'Eligio Maggiore =

Church of Sant'Eligio Maggiore
- Chiesa di Sant'Eligio Maggiore
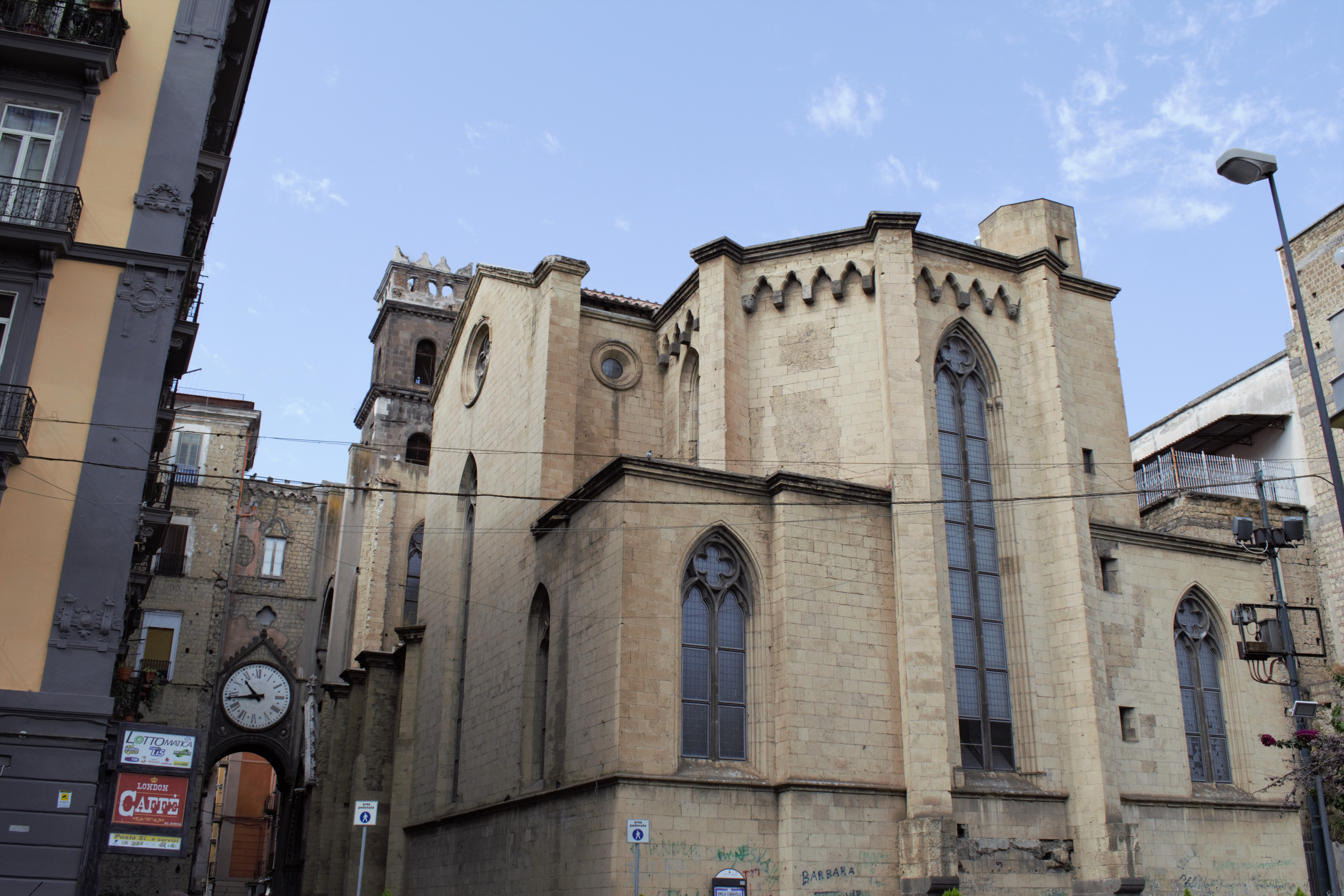
- The Church of Sant'Eligio Maggiore in Naples.
- Church of Sant'Eligio Maggiore
- 40.846755°N 14.264480°E
- Location: Piazza Mercato; Naples; Province of Naples, Campania
- Country: Italy
- Denomination: Roman Catholic

History
- Status: Active

Architecture
- Architectural type: Gothic architecture

Administration
- Diocese: Roman Catholic Archdiocese of Naples

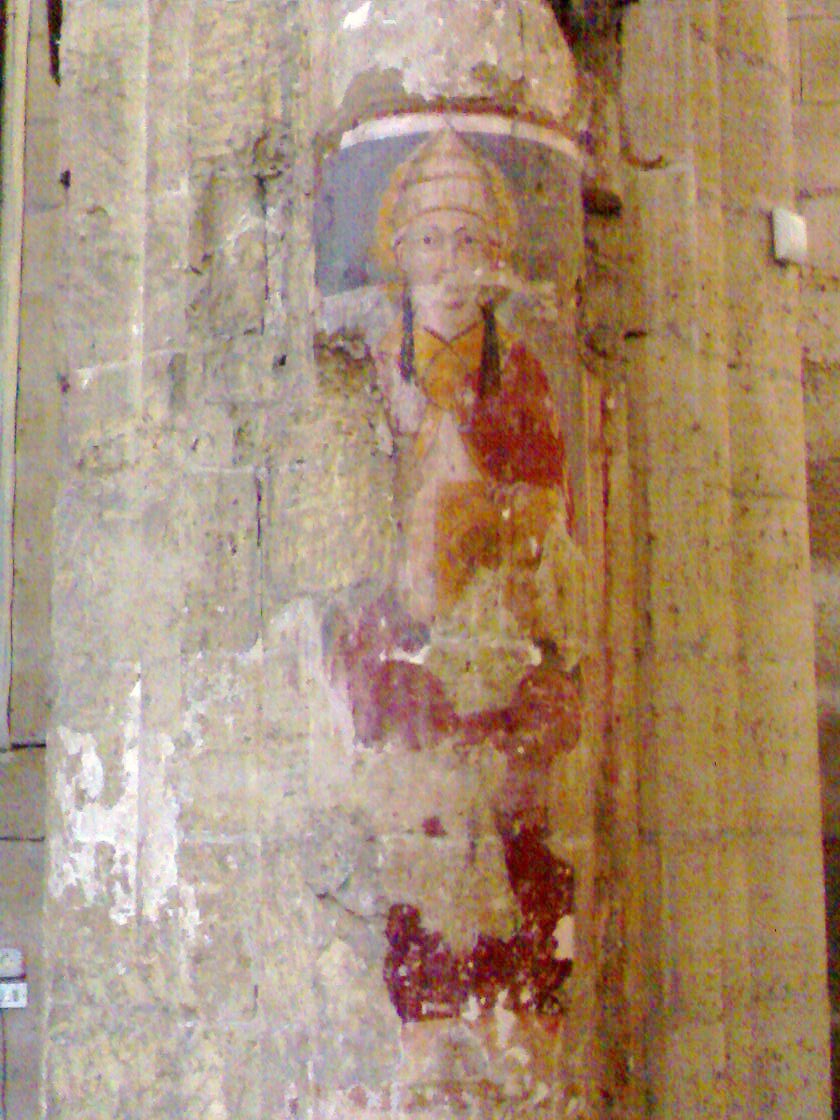
Frescoes.

Sant’Eligio Maggiore is a church in Naples, southern Italy.

== History ==
It is located near Piazza Mercato (Market Square), and was built during the reign of Charles of Anjou by the same congregation that built the nearby Sant’Eligio hospital in 1270. It is the first church built in Naples by the Angevin dynasty and therefore the first one in Gotico Angioino style.

The arched passageway that opens onto Piazza Mercato is through the original façade of the church and has since been incorporated into the structure of the ancient hospital. Many of the lines of the original structure came to light in the course of restoration after the bombardments of the World War II.
