= Torre Astura =

Coordinates: 41.408°N 12.765°E

Native name: Astura
- Etymology: Astura (Ancient Greek: Ἄστυρα)

Geography
- Location: Tyrrhenian Sea
- Adjacent to: Tyrrhenian Sea
- Total islands: 1 (now a peninsula)

Administration
- Italy
- Region: Lazio
- Province: Metropolitan City of Rome Capital
- Comune: Nettuno
- Capital and largest city: Rome (pop. 2,873,632 (2023))
- President: Sergio Mattarella
- Area covered: 301,340 km^{2} (116,350 sq mi)

Demographics
- Languages: Italian
- Ethnic groups: Italian

Additional information
- Time zone: CET (UTC+1)
  - Summer (DST): CEST (UTC+2)

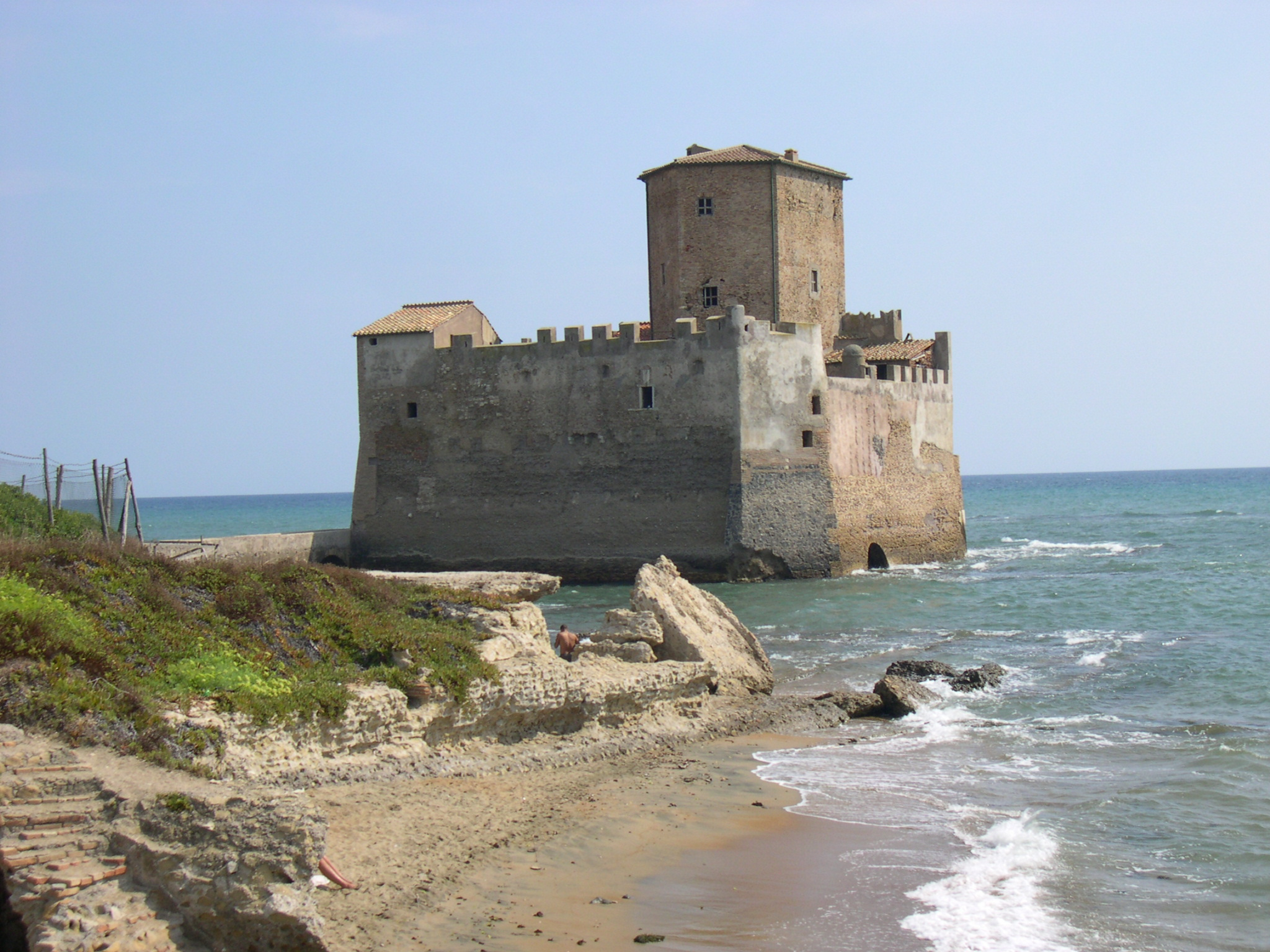
The medieval coastal Tower of the Frangipani.

Torre Astura, formerly an island called by the ancients merely Astura (Greek: Ἄστυρα), is now a peninsula in the comune of Nettuno, on the coast of Latium, Italy, at the southeast extremity of the Bay of Antium, on the road to Circeii. The name also belongs to a medieval coastal tower in the same site, as well as to the river which rises at the southern foot of the Alban Hills, and has a course of about 33 km before flowing into the sea immediately to the southeast.

It was called Storas (Στόρας) by Strabo, who tells us that it had a place of anchorage at its mouth. It was on the banks of this obscure stream that was fought, in 338 BC, the last great battle between the Romans and the Latins, in which the consul Gaius Maenius totally defeated the combined forces of Antium, Lanuvium, Aricia and Velitrae. At a much later period the little island at its mouth, and the whole adjacent coast, became occupied with Roman villas; among which the most celebrated is that of Cicero, to which he repeatedly alludes in his letters, and which he describes as locus amoenus et in mari ipso (a pleasant place and right by the sea), commanding a view both of Antium and Circeii, and to which he retired on the death of his daughter Tullia in 45 BC. It was from thence that, on learning his proscription by the triumvirs, he embarked, with the intention of escaping to join Brutus in Macedonia; a resolution which he afterwards abandoned. We learn from Suetonius also that Astura was the occasional resort both of Augustus and Tiberius, but due to its unhealthy climate, both Augustus and Tiberius contracted here the illnesses which proved fatal to them. Existing remains show that many of the Roman nobility must have had villas there. There is scholarly conflict as to whether there was a town of the name, as asserted by Servius. Up to at least the early 20th century, the remains of only one villa had been found on the island itself, but along the coast c. 1.5 km to the north-west a line of villas begins, which continues as far as Antium. To the south-east, on the other hand, remains are almost entirely absent, and this portion of the coast seems to have been sparsely populated in Roman times.

The island was at some time or other joined to the mainland by a bridge or causeway, and it thus became, as it now remains, a peninsula projecting into the sea. It is surmounted by a fortified tower, called the Torre di Astura, a picturesque object, conspicuous both from Antium and the Circeian headland, and the only one which breaks the monotony of the low and sandy coast between them. The medieval castle of the Frangipani family, in which Conradin vainly sought refuge after the battle of Tagliacozzo in 1268, is built upon the foundations of a very large villa, of opus reticulatum with later additions in brickwork, and with a small harbour attached to it on the south-east. The castle was later a fief of the Caetani, the Orsini and the Colonna. Remains of buildings also exist behind the sand dunes, which possibly mark the line of the channel which separated the island from the mainland, and these may have belonged to the post-station on the Via Severiana.

The Tabula Peutingeriana reckons Astura c. 10 km from Antium, which is rather less than the true distance. The island seems to have existed as such in the time of Pope Honorius III.
