= Santa Maria del Carmine, Naples =

Roman Catholic church in Naples, Italy

Basilica of Our Lady of Mount Carmel Basilica di Santa Maria del Carmine (in Italian)
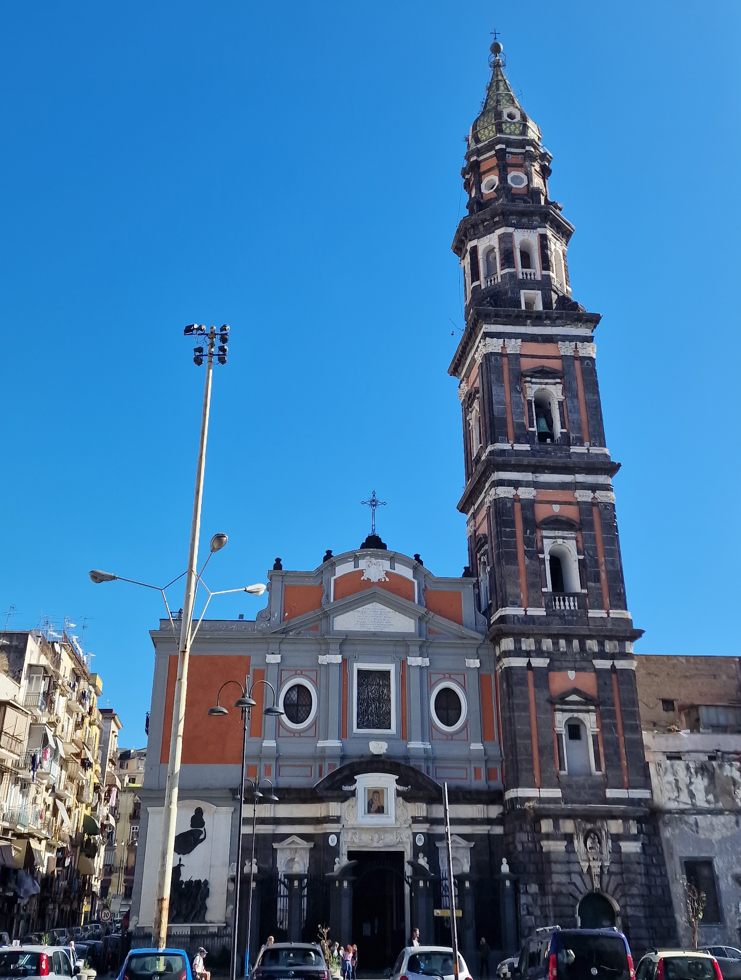
- The Church of the Carmine in Naples.

Religion
- Affiliation: Roman Catholic
- Diocese: Archdiocese of Naples
- Ecclesiastical or organizational status: Minor basilica

Location
- Location: Naples, Campania, Italy
- Interactive map of Basilica of Our Lady of Mount Carmel; Basilica di Santa Maria del Carmine (in Italian)
- Coordinates: 40.846814°N 14.267583°E

Architecture
- Type: Church
- Style: Baroque

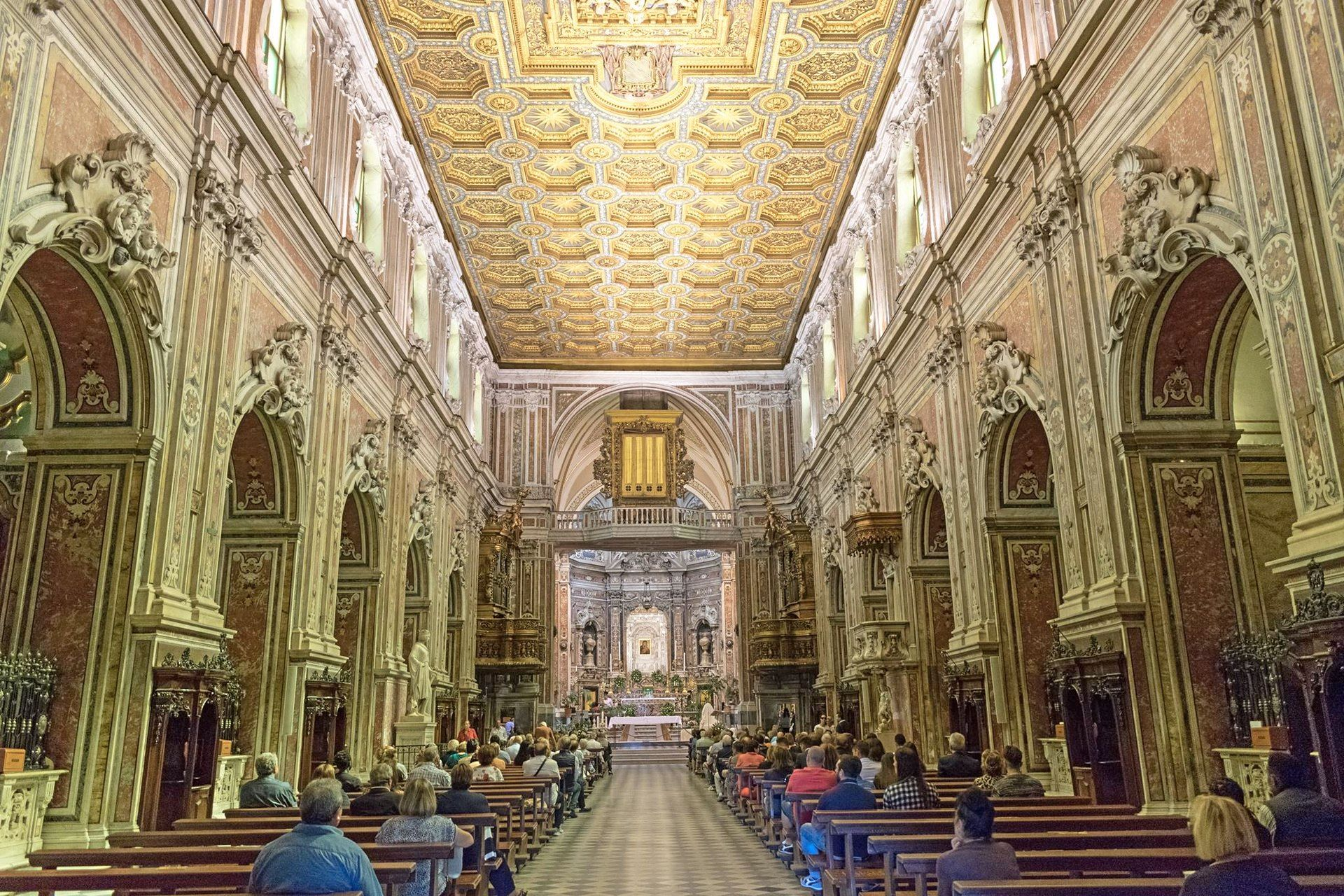
Interior

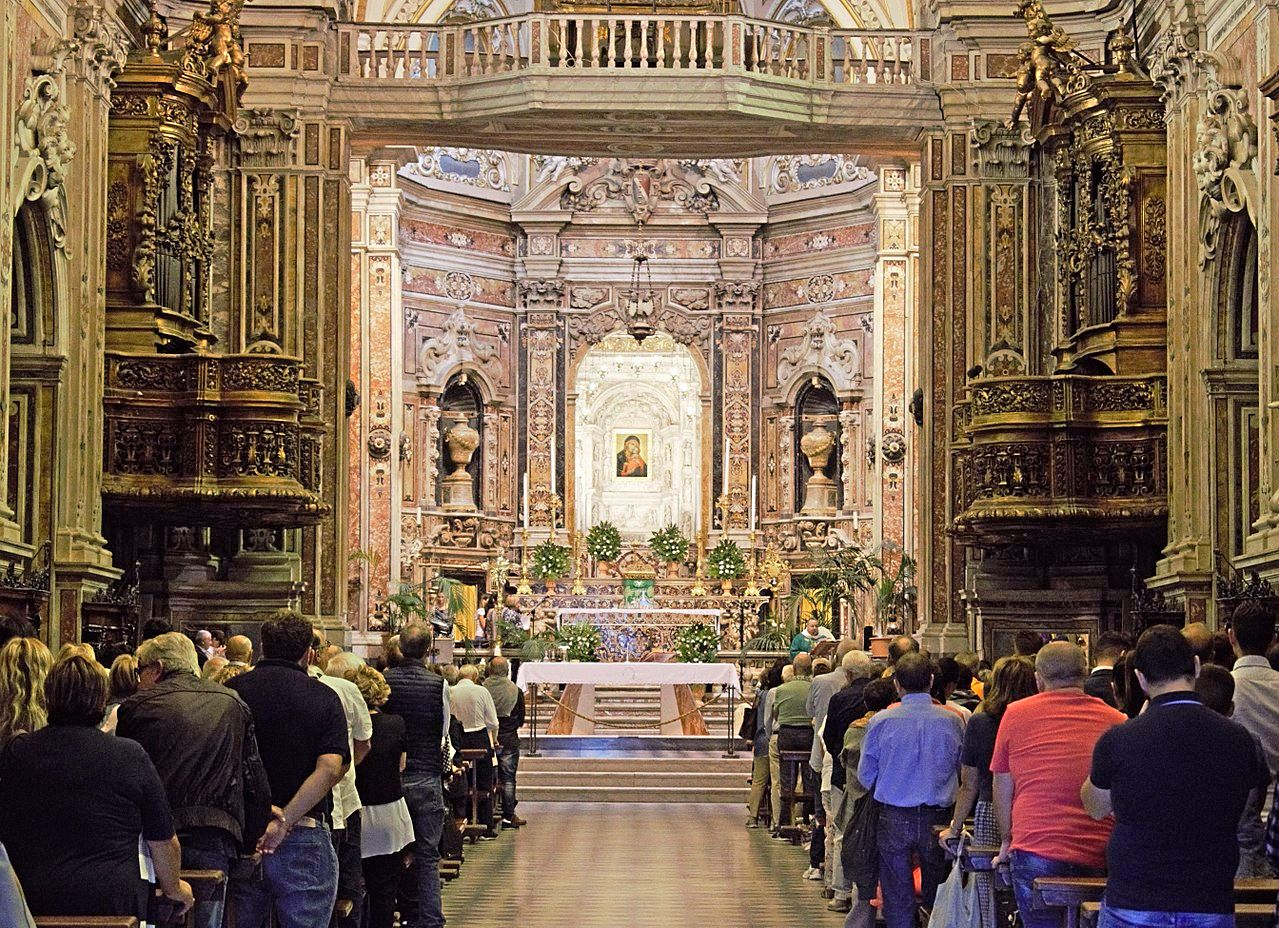
Apse with polychrome marblesr

Santa Maria del Carmine (Our Lady of Mount Carmel) is a church in Naples, Italy. It is at one end of Piazza Mercato (Market Square), the centre of civic life in Naples for many centuries until it was cut off from the rest of the city by urban renewal in 1900. The church was founded in the 13th century by Carmelite friars driven from the Holy Land in the Crusades, presumably arriving in the Bay of Naples aboard Amalfitan ships. Some sources, however, place the original refugees from Mount Carmel as early as the eighth century. The church is still in use and the 75–metre bell tower is visible from a distance even amidst taller modern buildings.

The square adjacent to the church was the site in 1268 of the execution of Conradin, the last Hohenstaufen heir to the throne of the kingdom of Naples, at the hands of Charles I of Anjou, thus beginning the Angevin reign of the kingdom. Conrad's mother, Elisabeth of Bavaria, founded the church for the good of the souls of her young son and his companion, Frederick of Baden as well as a resting place for their remains, where they remain today. A statue was erected to Conrad's memory, commissioned by then crown-prince, Maximilian II of Bavaria, designed by the Neoclassic sculptor Thorvaldsen, and completed by his pupil Schopf in 1847.

In 1647 the square was the site of battles between rebels and royal troops during Masaniello's revolt, and later, in 1799, it was the scene of the mass execution of leaders of the Neapolitan Republic of 1799. The area – including parts of the church premises – was heavily bombed in World War II and still shows the scars of the devastation.

The old monastic grounds adjacent to the church now serve as a shelter for the needy and homeless. The church is home to two renowned religious relics: one, the painting of the "Brown Madonna" (Italian: Madonna Bruna), is said to have been brought by the original Carmelites; the second is a figure of the Crucifixion in which the crown of thorns is missing. According to legend, the crown fell off as Christ's head moved when the building was struck by a cannonball in 1439 during the Aragonese siege.

== Interior ==
The elaborate Baroque decoration (1755–56), including stucco, carved wood, and polychrome marble, was designed by Nicola Tagliacozzi Canale. The statue of St Michael Archangel is attributed to Girolamo Santacroce. The church also has a funeral monument to Conradin of Swabia. The chapels have altarpieces by Mattia Preti, Giovanni Sarnelli, Matteo Bottigliero, Francesco De Mura, Francesco Solimena, and Antonio Sarnelli. The Chapel of the Virgin del Carmelo, has a 12th-century icon of the Virgin and child. The presbytery has some alabaster urns. The main altar was completed by Pietro and Giuseppe Mazzetti. The sacristy has frescoes by Filippo Falciatore, depicting Carmelite Order saints. The bell tower was rebuilt by architect Giuseppe Nuvolo in the 17th century, and has an onion-dome cupola decorated with maiolica.
