= Tuli ja raud =

1938 novel by Karl Ristikivi

- Title page for Tuli ja raud (1984 edition)
- Author: Karl Ristikivi
- Language: Estonian
- Series: Tallinn trilogy
- Publisher: Loodus
- Publication date: 1938
- Publication place: Estonia
- Pages: 463
- ISBN: 978-9949-442-11-9
- Followed by: Õige mehe koda

Tuli ja raud (English: Fire and Iron) is a novel by Estonian author Karl Ristikivi. It was first published in 1938 by Loodus.
