= Lake Koosa =

Lake in Estonia

- Koosa järv (Estonian)
- Location within Estonia
- Location: Vara Parish, Tartu County, Estonia
- Coordinates: 58°25.5′N 27°8.5′E
- Basin countries: Estonia
- Max. length: 3,150 meters (10,330 ft)
- Max. width: 1,240 meters (4,070 ft)
- Surface area: 285.9 hectares (706 acres)
- Average depth: 1.15 meters (3 ft 9 in)
- Max. depth: 1.9 meters (6 ft 3 in)
- Water volume: 2,998,000 cubic meters (105,900,000 cu ft)
- Shore length^{1}: 8,090 meters (26,540 ft)
- Surface elevation: 30.0 meters (98.4 ft)
- ^{1} Shore length is not a well-defined measure.

Lake Koosa (Estonian: Koosa järv or Kuusjärv) is a lake in Estonia. It is located in the village of Praaga in Peipsiääre Parish, Tartu County.

== Physical description ==
The lake has an area of 285.9 hectares (706 acres). The lake has an average depth of 1.1 meters (3 ft 7 in) and a maximum depth of 1.9 meters (6 ft 3 in). It is 3,150 meters (10,330 ft) long, and its shoreline measures 8,090 meters (26,540 ft). It has a volume of 2,998,000 cubic meters (105,900,000 cu ft).

== See also ==
- List of lakes of Estonia
