= Orto (company) =

Estonian diaspora publishing house

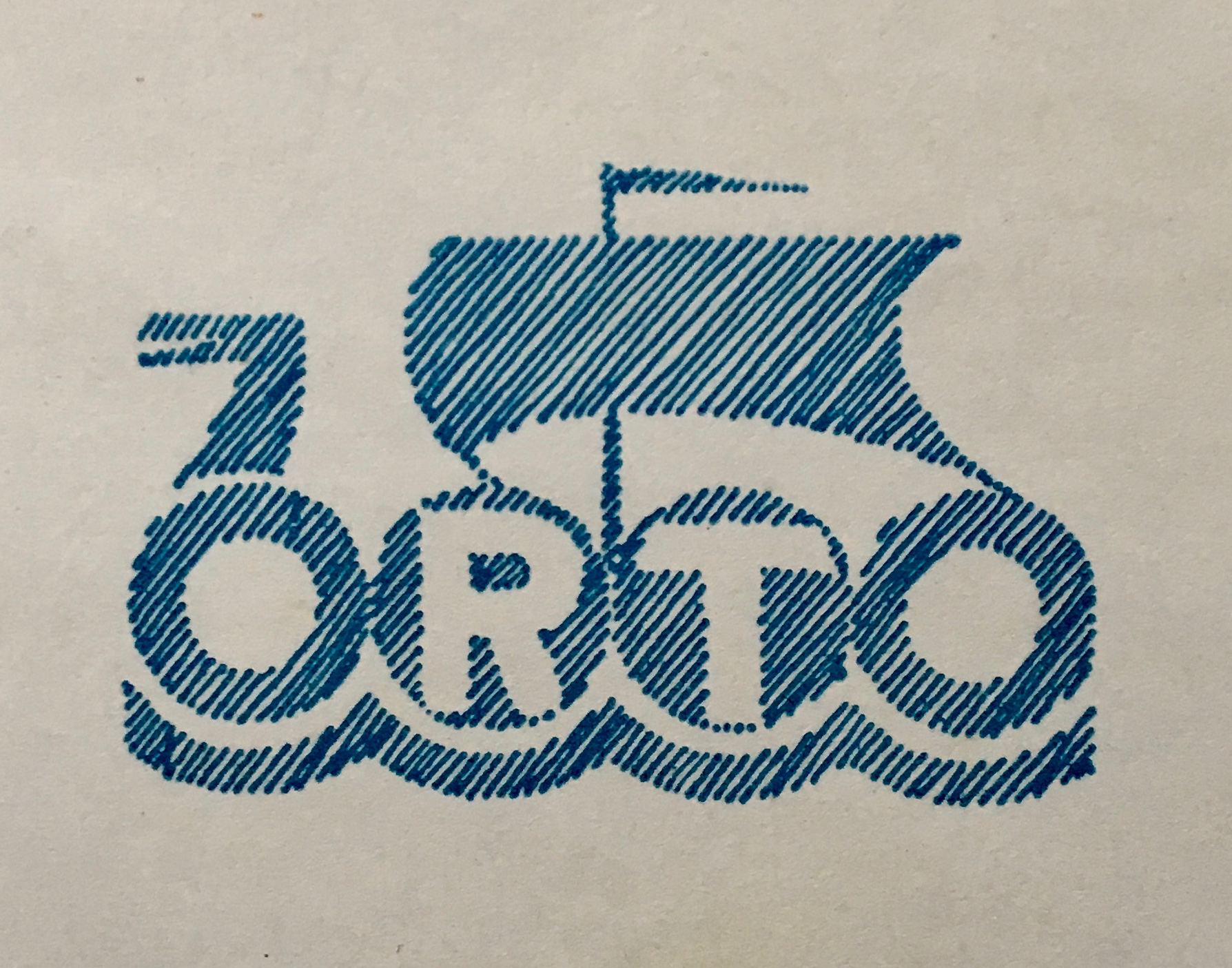
Logo

Orto (also Eesti Kirjastus Orto) was an Estonian publishing company outside Estonia. The company published mainly classical works of Estonian literature, but also new books by Estonian-language writers.

The company was established in 1944 Helsinki. Soon, the company was moved to Vadstena, Sweden. Later, the company was moved to Toronto, Canada.

The company's owner was Andres Laur.

In total, the company published 405 different kind of books.

== See also ==
=== Archives ===
There is a Orto Estonian Publishing House fonds at Library and Archives Canada. The archival reference number is R3396.
