= Conradin =

Duke of Swabia, King of Jerusalem and Sicily (1252–1268)

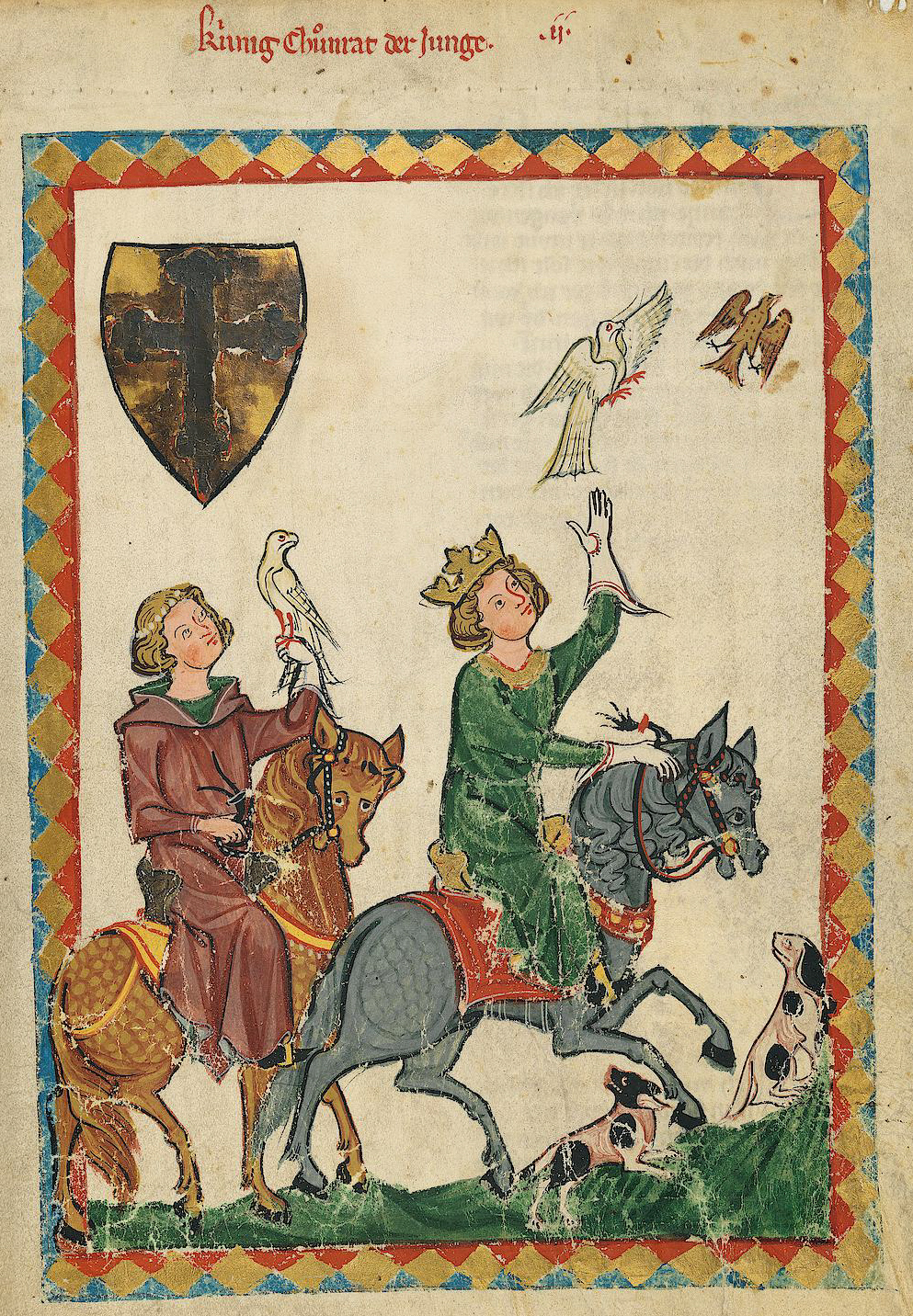
- King Conrad the Younger, from the Codex Manesse (Folio 7r), c. 1304

King of Jerusalem
- Reign: 21 May 1254 – 29 October 1268
- Predecessor: Conrad II
- Successor: Hugh I

King of Sicily
- Reign: 21 May 1254 – 1258
- Predecessor: Conrad I
- Successor: Manfred of Sicily

Duke of Swabia
- Reign: 21 May 1254 – 29 October 1268
- Predecessor: Conrad III
- Successor: Rudolph II of Austria (titular)
- Born: 25 March 1252; Wolfstein Castle near Landshut, Bavaria, Holy Roman Empire
- Died: 29 October 1268 (aged 16); Naples, Kingdom of Sicily
- Burial: Basilica di Santa Maria del Carmine, Naples
- House: Hohenstaufen
- Father: Conrad IV of Germany
- Mother: Elisabeth of Bavaria

Conrad (25 March 1252 – 29 October 1268), called the Younger or the Boy, but usually known by the diminutive Conradin (German: Konradin, Italian: Corradino), was the last direct heir of the House of Hohenstaufen. He was Duke of Swabia (1254–1268) and nominal King of Jerusalem (1254–1268) and Sicily (1254–1258). After his attempt to reclaim the Kingdom of Sicily for the Hohenstaufen dynasty failed, he was captured and beheaded. He was the last of the Hohenstaufen kings.

== Early childhood ==
Conradin was born in Wolfstein, Bavaria, to Conrad IV of Germany and Elisabeth of Bavaria. Though he never succeeded his father as king of Germany, he was recognized as king of Sicily and Jerusalem by supporters of the Hohenstaufens in 1254.

Having lost his father in 1254, he grew up at the court of his uncle and guardian, Duke Louis II of Bavaria. His guardians were able to hold Swabia for him. The Kingdom of Jerusalem was held by a relative from the royal house of Cyprus as regent. In Sicily, his father's half-brother Manfred continued as regent, but began to develop plans to usurp the kingship.

Little is known of his appearance and character except that he was as "beautiful as Absalom, and spoke good Latin". Although his father had entrusted him to the guardianship of the church, Pope Alexander IV forbade Conradin's election as king of Germany and offered the Hohenstaufen lands in Germany to King Alfonso X of Castile and Richard of Cornwall.

== Political and military career ==
Having assumed the title of king of Jerusalem and Sicily, Conradin took possession of the Duchy of Swabia in 1262, and remained for some time in his duchy. Conradin's first invitation to Italy came from the Guelphs of Florence: they asked him to take arms against Manfred, who had been crowned king of Sicily in 1258 on a false rumor of Conradin's death. Louis refused this invitation on his nephew's behalf. In 1266 count Charles I of Anjou, called by the new pope Clement IV, defeated and killed Manfred at Benevento, taking possession of southern Italy: envoys from the Ghibelline cities went then to Bavaria and urged Conradin to come and free Italy. Count Guido de Montefeltro representing Henry of Castile, Senator of Rome, offered him the support of the eternal city. Pledging his lands, Conradin crossed the Alps and issued a manifesto at Verona setting forth his claim on Sicily.

Notwithstanding the defection of his uncle Louis and of other companions who returned to Germany, the threats of Clement IV, and a lack of funds, his cause seemed to prosper. Proclaiming him king of Sicily, his partisans, among them Henry of Castile, both in the north and south of Italy took up arms. Rome received his envoy with enthusiasm; and the young king himself received welcomes at Pavia, Pisa and Siena. In September 1267 a Spanish fleet under Frederick of Castile, and a number of knights from Pisa, and Spanish knights soldiering from Tunis, disembarked in the Sicilian city of Sciacca, and most of the island rebelled against the Angevin rule. Only Palermo and Messina remained loyal to Charles. The revolt spread to Calabria and Apulia. In November of the same year the Pope excommunicated him. His fleet won a victory over that of Charles I of Anjou, and in July 1268, Conradin himself entered Rome to a great and popular reception.

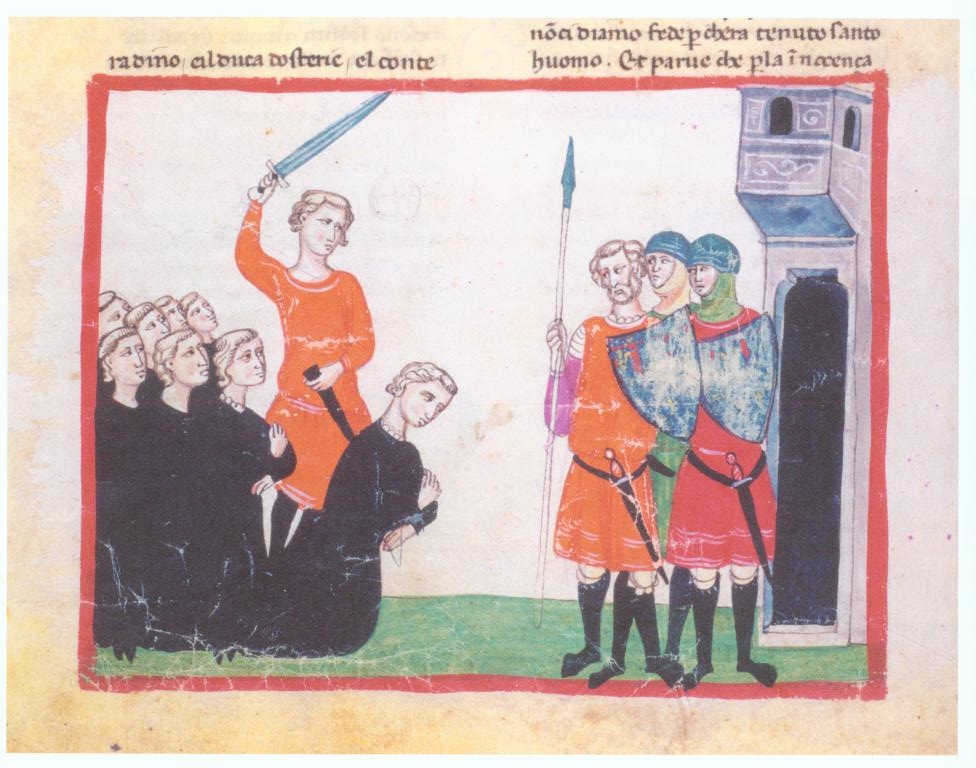
Execution of Conradin by Giovanni Villani, Nuova Cronica, 14th century

Having strengthened his forces, he marched towards Lucera to join the Siculo Muslims troops settled there since the time of his grandfather. On 23 August 1268 his multinational army of Italian, Spanish, Roman, Siculos and German troops encountered that of Charles at Tagliacozzo, in a hilly area of central Italy. The eagerness of Conradin's forces, notably that of the Spanish knights led by Henry of Castile who mounted a triumphant charge and captured the Angevin banner, initially appeared to have secured victory. But their inability to see through Charles' ruse allowed the latter to ultimately emerge victorious once the elite of his army, the veteran French knights he had hidden behind a hill, entered the battle to the surprise of the enemy. Escaping from the field of battle, Conradin reached Rome, but acting on advice to leave the city he proceeded to Astura in an attempt to sail for Sicily. However, upon reaching his destination he was arrested and handed over to Charles, who imprisoned him in the Castel dell'Ovo in Naples, together with the inseparable Frederick of Baden. On 29 October 1268, Conradin and Frederick were beheaded.

== Legacy ==
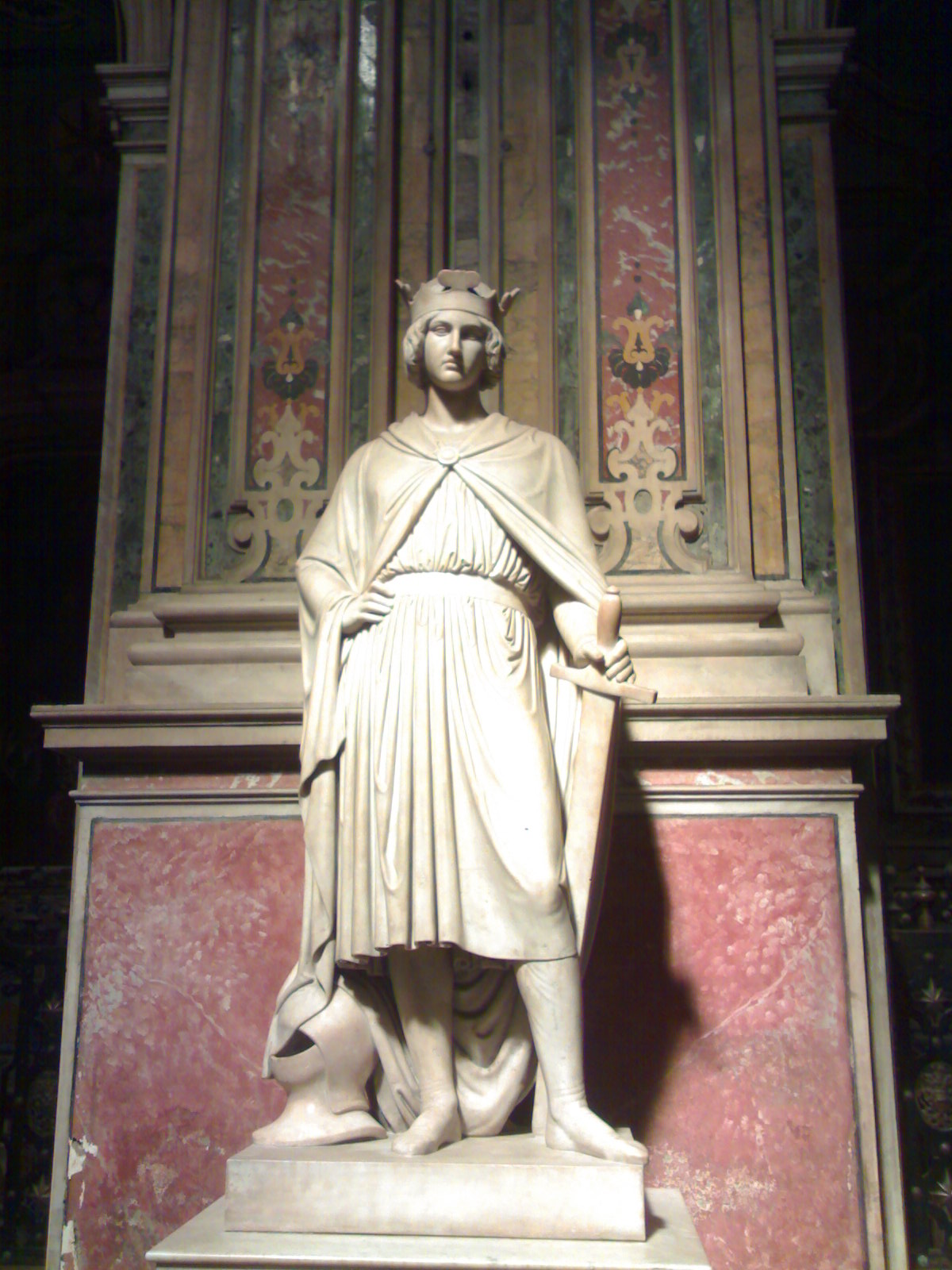
Memorial by Thorvaldsen

With Conradin's death at 16, the male line of the Hohenstaufen dynasty became extinct. (Note: After Conradin's demise, the remaining members of the Staufer dynasty were his half-aunts Margaret and Anna and the offspring of his-uncle Manfred. Both Anna and Manfred were the children of Frederick II by his mistress and fourth wife, Bianca Lancia. However, despite being born out of wedlock, they were legitimised by the posterior marriage of their parents on their mother's deathbed (which is attested in at least two medieval sources, the Chronicles of Salimbene di Adam and Mathew of Paris). This means that upon the deaths of Margaret in 1270 and Anna in 1307, Manfred's issue were the only ones who could have claimed dynastic rights to the House of Hohenstaufen, whose last member was indeed his son, Henry [Enrico], deceased on 31 October 1318 (as referenced by source n. 5).) His remains, with those of Frederick of Baden, lie in the church of the monastery of Our Lady of Mt. Carmel at Naples, founded by his mother for the good of his soul; and here in 1847 Maximilian, crown prince of Bavaria, erected a marble statue by Bertel Thorvaldsen to his memory. In the 14th-century Codex Manesse, a collection of medieval German lyrics, preserved at Heidelberg, there appear two songs written by Conradin, and his fate has formed the subject of several dramas.

His hereditary Kingdom of Jerusalem passed to the heirs of his great-great-grandmother Isabella I of Jerusalem, among whom a succession dispute arose. The senior heir in primogeniture was Hugh of Brienne, a second cousin of Conradin's father, but another second cousin Hugh III of Cyprus already held the office of regent and managed to keep the kingdom as Hugh I of Jerusalem. Conradin's grandmother's first cousin Mary of Antioch also staked her claim on basis of proximity of blood, which she later sold to Conradin's executioner Charles of Anjou.

According to a strict sense of legitimacy, (Note: Despite the fact that he usurped his nephew's crown, if Manfred is deemed legitimate, his sons and after them the offspring of his eldest daughter would have been Conradin's natural successors in Sicily and Swabia.) the general heiress of his Kingdom of Sicily and the Duchy of Swabia was his aunt Margaret, half-sister of his father Conrad IV (the youngest but only surviving child of Frederick II and his third wife, Isabella of England) and married with Albert, Landgrave of Thuringia since 1255. Their son Frederick claimed Sicily and Swabia on her right.

However, these claims met with little favor. Swabia, pawned by Conradin before his last expedition, was disintegrating as a territorial unit. He went unrecognized in Outremer, and Charles of Anjou was deeply entrenched in power in Southern Italy. Margrave Frederick proposed an invasion of Italy in 1269, and attracted some support from the Lombard Ghibellines, but his plans were never carried out, and he played no further part in Italian affairs.

Finally, Sicily passed to Charles of Anjou, but the Sicilian Vespers in 1282 resulted in dual claims on the Kingdom; the Aragonese heirs of Manfred retaining the island of Sicily and the Angevin party retaining the southern part of Italy, popularly called the Kingdom of Naples.

== In literature ==
Conradin was the subject of artistic interpretation in the nineteenth and early twentieth century. Several paintings and works of literature, especially poetry, depicted his military campaign and his execution. Felicia Hemans, best known for "The boy stood on the burning deck", wrote in 1824 "The Death of Conradin". Charles Swain wrote "Conradin" in 1832, a poem which inspired the first of "Three Tone Poems for Solo Piano" by Justin Henry Rubin. Conradin : a philosophical ballad was written by C. R. Ashbee, dedicated to his patron and friend Colonel Shaw Hellier, and published in 1908 by Essex House Press, "one of the most significant private presses at work during the Arts and Crafts movement"

The novel Põlev lipp (The Burning Banner) by Karl Ristikivi (1961; in Estonian) depicts Conradin's Italian campaign. A translation into the French by Jean Pascal Ollivry L'étendard en flammes, was published in Paris in 2005.

== Bibliography ==
- F. W. Schirrmacher, Die letzten Hohenstaufen (Göttingen, 1871)
- K. Hampe, Geschichte Konradins von Hohenstaufen (Berlin, 1893)
- del Giudice, Il Giudizio e la condanna di Corradino (Naples, 1876)
- G. Cattaneo, Federico II di Svevia (Rome, 1992)
- E. Miller, Konradin von Hohenstaufen (Berlin, 1897)

Regnal titles
| Preceded by Conrad I | King of Sicily; 1254–1258 | Succeeded by Manfred |
| Preceded by Conrad I | King of Jerusalem; 1254–1268 | Succeeded by Hugh III |
| Preceded by Conrad I | Duke of Swabia; 1254–1268 | Duchy disintegrated |
