= Eesti Kirjanike Kooperatiiv =

Estonian publishing house

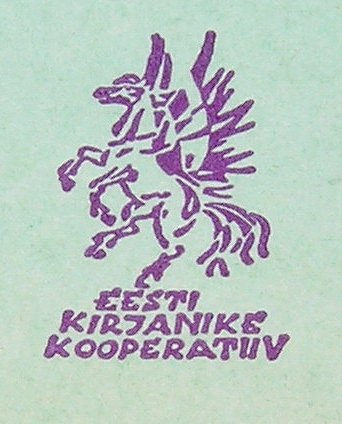
Logo of the Estonian Writers' Cooperative

Eesti Kirjanike Kooperatiiv (Estonian Writers' Cooperative) was a publishing house in Lund, Sweden.

It was founded by members of the Estonian diaspora, mainly writers August Gailit, Bernard Kangro, Valev Uibopuu and Enn Vallak, in 1950 and existed until 1994.

Writers whose books were published: Artur Adson, August Gailit, Gert Helbemäe, Ella Ilbak, Bernard Kangro, Albert Kivikas, Pedro Krusten, August Mälk, Karl Ristikivi, Gustav Suits, Valev Uibopuu, Marie Under, and Henrik Visnapuu.

== See also ==
- Eesti Kirjastus Orto
