= 2015 WRC3 Championship =

The 2015 FIA WRC3 Championship is the third season of WRC3, a rallying championship organised and governed by the Fédération Internationale de l'Automobile, running in support of the World Rally Championship. It was created when the Group R class of rally car was introduced in 2013. The Championship is composed by thirteen Rallies, and Drivers and Teams must nominate a maximum of six event. The best five results will be counted towards the championship.

Stéphane Lefebvre is the defending champion, as he won the 2014 title.

== Calendar ==
The 2015 calendar was announced at a meeting of the FIA World Motor Sport Council in Beijing in September 2014. The season maintained the same rallies as the 2014 season and was contested over thirteen rounds in Europe, the Americas and Oceania.

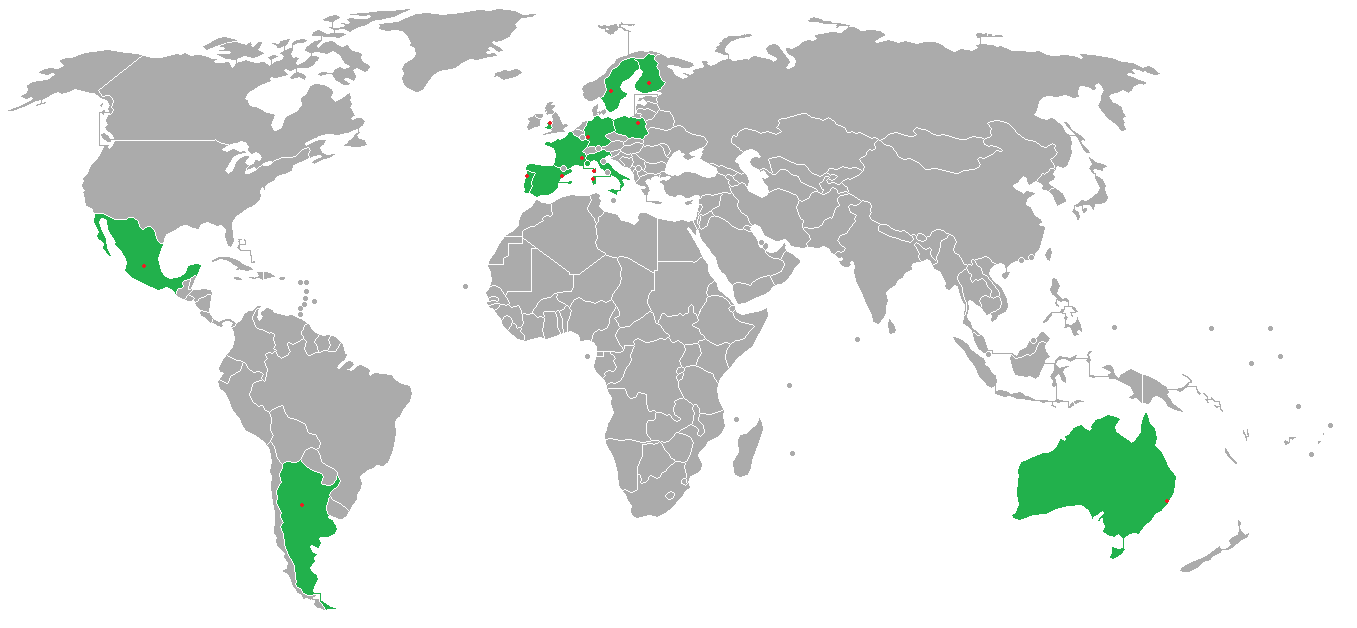
A map showing the locations of the rallies in the 2015 season

Round	Dates	Rally name	Rally headquarters	Surface
1	22–25 January	(Monaco) Monte Carlo Rally	Gap, Hautes-Alpes, France	Mixed
2	13–15 February	Rally Sweden	Hagfors, Värmland	Snow
3	6–8 March	Rally Mexico	León, Guanajuato	Gravel
4	24–26 April	Rally Argentina	Villa Carlos Paz, Córdoba	Gravel
5	22–24 May	Rally de Portugal	Matosinhos, Porto	Gravel
6	12–14 June	(Italy) Rally Italia Sardegna	Alghero, Sardinia	Gravel
7	3–5 July	Rally Poland	Mikołajki, Warmia-Masuria	Gravel
8	31 July–2 August	Rally Finland	Jyväskylä, Keski-Suomi	Gravel
9	21–23 August	(Germany) Rallye Deutschland	Trier, Rhineland-Palatinate	Tarmac
10	11–13 September	Rally Australia	Coffs Harbour, New South Wales	Gravel
11	2–4 October	(France) Tour de Corse	Ajaccio, Corse-du-Sud	Tarmac
12	23–25 October	(Spain) Rally de Catalunya	Salou, Tarragona	Mixed
13	13–15 November	(United Kingdom) Wales Rally GB	Deeside, Flintshire	Gravel

Notes:

- ^1 — The Rallies of Germany and France were provisional inclusions subject to negotiation of a new agreement between their organisers and series promoters.

=== Calendar changes ===
- The Rallye Monte Carlo adopted Rally-2 regulations, allowing retired competitors to restart the event the next day with a time penalty. Prior to 2015, the Rallye Monte Carlo was the only event being run without Rally-2 regulations.
- The Rally de Portugal and Rally Argentina swapped places in the calendar.
- The Rally of Portugal moved from its base in the town of Faro in the Algarve region—where it had been headquartered from 2007 until 2014—and relocated to the country's north, its original home prior until its removal from the calendar in 2002.
- On 6 February 2015, the Fédération Française du Sport Automobile (FFSA) announced that the Tour de Corse would replace the Rallye de France Alsace on the calendar for financial reasons.

== Regulation changes ==
- In the WRC 2 and WRC 3 Championships for Teams, only the best placed car in a team will be taken into account for points.
- A car which has not started from the start line within 20 seconds will be considered as retired and will be able to restart under Rally 2 on the subsequent day.
- The transmission of performance data or information to or from a competing car, not in relation with safety, is forbidden during special stages to help promote greater competition.

== Teams and drivers ==
Entries
Constructor		Team	Tyre		Drivers		Co-drivers	Rounds
Citroën (Citroën DS3 R3T)	(United Arab Emirates)	Abu Dhabi Racing	M	(United Arab Emirates)	Mohammed Al Mutawaa	(United Kingdom)	Stephen McAuley	5, 7–8, 11–13
Citroën (Citroën DS3 R3T)	(Germany)	ADAC Team Weser-Ems	M	(Germany)	Christian Riedemann	(Germany)	Michael Wenzel	1
Citroën (Citroën DS3 R3T)	(Finland)	AKK Sports Team Finland	M	(Finland)	Jari Huttunen	(Finland)	Antti Linnaketo	8
Citroën (Citroën DS3 R3T)	(France)	Charlotte Dalmasso	M	(France)	Charlotte Dalmasso	(France)	Marine Delon	1
Citroën (Citroën DS3 R3T)	(France)	Charlotte Dalmasso	M	(France)	Charlotte Dalmasso	(France)	Céline Rovira	5
Citroën (Citroën DS3 R3T)	(France)	Charlotte Dalmasso	M	(France)	Charlotte Dalmasso	(France)	Marion Renchet	11
Citroën (Citroën DS3 R3T)	(Switzerland)	Federico Della Casa	M	(Switzerland)	Federico Della Casa	(Italy)	Domenico Pozzi	5, 7–8, 11–12
Citroën (Citroën DS3 R3T)	(France)	Equipe de France FFSA	M	(France)	Yohan Rossel	(France)	Benoît Fulcrand	1, 11
Citroën (Citroën DS3 R3T)	(France)	Terry Folb	M	(France)	Terry Folb	(France)	Franck Le Floch	1, 5, 7–8, 11–13
Citroën (Citroën DS3 R3T)	(France)	Quentin Gilbert	M	(France)	Quentin Gilbert	(Belgium)	Renaud Jamoul	1, 5, 7–8, 11–13
Citroën (Citroën DS3 R3T)	(Finland)	Hannu's Rally Team	M	(Finland)	Henri Haapamäki	(Finland)	Marko Salminen	5, 7–8
Citroën (Citroën DS3 R3T)	(Belgium)	J-Motorsport	M	(Belgium)	John Wartique	(France)	Gabin Moreau	1
Citroën (Citroën DS3 R3T)	(France)	Pierre-Louis Loubet	M	(France)	Pierre-Louis Loubet	(France)	Victor Bellotto	5, 7–8
Citroën (Citroën DS3 R3T)	(France)	Pierre-Louis Loubet	M	(France)	Pierre-Louis Loubet	(France)	Vincent Landais	11–13
Citroën (Citroën DS3 R3T)	(Hungary)	Kornél Lukács	M	(Hungary)	Kornél Lukács	(Hungary)	Márk Mesterházi	1
Citroën (Citroën DS3 R3T)	(Hungary)	Varga Racing Team	M	(Hungary)	Kornél Lukács	(Hungary)	Márk Mesterházi	5
Citroën (Citroën DS3 R3T)	(France)	Matthieu Margaillan	M	(France)	Matthieu Margaillan	(France)	Mathilde Margaillan	5
Citroën (Citroën DS3 R3T)	(France)	Matthieu Margaillan	M	(France)	Matthieu Margaillan	(France)	Fabrice Gordon	7–8
Citroën (Citroën DS3 R3T)	(Republic of Ireland)	Daniel McKenna	M	(Republic of Ireland)	Daniel McKenna	(Republic of Ireland)	Andrew Grennan	1, 5, 8
Citroën (Citroën DS3 R3T)	(France)	Jean-René Perry	M	(France)	Jean-René Perry	(France)	Joshua Reibel	5, 7–8
Citroën (Citroën DS3 R3T)	(France)	Jean-René Perry	M	(France)	Jean-René Perry	(France)	Christopher Guieu	11
Citroën (Citroën DS3 R3T)	(Finland)	Printsport	M	(Norway)	Ole Christian Veiby	(Norway)	Anders Jæger	1–2, 8, 11–13
Citroën (Citroën DS3 R3T)	(Finland)	Printsport	M	(Norway)	Ole Christian Veiby	(Norway)	Stig Rune Skjærmoen	5
Citroën (Citroën DS3 R3T)	(United Kingdom)	Osian Pryce	M	(United Kingdom)	Osian Pryce	(United Kingdom)	Dale Furniss	5, 7, 13
Citroën (Citroën DS3 R3T)	(Republic of Ireland)	Dean Raftery	M	(Republic of Ireland)	Dean Raftery	(Republic of Ireland)	John Higgins	5
Citroën (Citroën DS3 R3T)	(Republic of Ireland)	Dean Raftery	M	(Republic of Ireland)	Dean Raftery	(Republic of Ireland)	Arthur Kierans	13
Citroën (Citroën DS3 R3T)	(Italy)	Alessandro Re	M	(Italy)	Alessandro Re	(Italy)	Giacomo Ciucci	1
Citroën (Citroën DS3 R3T)	(France)	Team ORECA	M	(Finland)	Teemu Suninen	(Finland)	Mikko Markkula	5–6, 8
Citroën (Citroën DS3 R3T)	(Romania)	Simone Tempestini	M	(Romania)	Simone Tempestini	(Italy)	Matteo Chiarcossi	1, 5, 7–8, 11–13
Citroën (Citroën DS3 R3T)	(France)	Jordan Berfa	M	(France)	Jordan Berfa	(France)	Damien Augustin	11
Citroën (Citroën DS3 R3T)	(France)	Jean-Philippe Martini	M	(France)	Jean-Philippe Martini	(France)	Ambroise Fieschi	11
Citroën (Citroën DS3 R3T)	(United Kingdom)	Chris Ingram	M	(United Kingdom)	Chris Ingram	(France)	Gabin Moreau	13
Citroën (Citroën DS3 R3T)	(Belgium)	William Wagner	M	(Belgium)	William Wagner	(France)	Kevin Parent	13
Peugeot (Peugeot 208 R2)	(Italy)	ACI Team Italia	P	(Italy)	Giuseppe Testa	(Italy)	Emanuele Inglesi	5–7
Peugeot (Peugeot 208 R2)	(Italy)	ACI Team Italia	P	(Italy)	Fabio Andolfi	(Italy)	Simone Scattolin	5–8, 12–13
Peugeot (Peugeot 208 R2)	(Italy)	ACI Team Italia	P	(Italy)	Damiano De Tommaso	(Italy)	Massimiliano Bosi	7–8, 12–13
Renault (Renault Clio R3T)	(France)	Stéphane Consani	P	(France)	Stéphane Consani	(France)	Maxime Vilmot	1
Renault (Renault Clio R3T)	(France)	Team Renault Sport Technologies	TBA	(Italy)	Andrea Crugnola	(Italy)	Michele Ferrara	5–7, 9, 11–12

== Rally summaries ==
Round	Event name	Winning driver	Winning co-driver	Winning Entry	Winning Car	Winning time	Report
1	(Monaco) Monte Carlo Rally	(France) Quentin Gilbert	(Belgium) Renaud Jamoul	(France) Quentin Gilbert	Citroën DS3 R3T	4:08:32.7	Report
2	Rally Sweden	(Norway) Ole Christian Veiby	(Norway) Anders Jæger	(Finland) Printsport	Citroën DS3 R3T	3:16:03.5	Report
3	Rally Mexico	No WRC3 entries.					Report
4	Rally Argentina	No WRC3 entries.					Report
5	Rally de Portugal	(France) Quentin Gilbert	(Belgium) Renaud Jamoul	(France) Quentin Gilbert	Citroën DS3 R3T	4:03:52.5	Report
6	(Italy) Rally Italia Sardegna	(Finland) Teemu Suninen	(Finland) Mikko Markkula	(France) Team ORECA	Citroën DS3 R3T	5:54:13.8	Report
7	Rally Poland	(Italy) Simone Tempestini	(Italy) Matteo Chiarcossi	(Italy) Simone Tempestini	Citroën DS3 R3T	2:47:32.3	Report
8	Rally Finland	(France) Quentin Gilbert	(Belgium) Renaud Jamoul	(France) Quentin Gilbert	Citroën DS3 R3T	2:54:43.6	Report
9	(Germany) Rallye Deutschland	(Italy) Andrea Crugnola	(Italy) Michele Ferrara	(France) Team Renault Sport Technologies	Renault Clio R3T	4:07:48.8	Report
10	Rally Australia	No WRC3 entries.					Report
11	(France) Tour de Corse	(Italy) Simone Tempestini	(Italy) Matteo Chiarcossi	(Italy) Simone Tempestini	Citroën DS3 R3T	2:57:39.0	Report
12	(Spain) Rally Catalunya	(France) Quentin Gilbert	(Belgium) Renaud Jamoul	(France) Quentin Gilbert	Citroën DS3 R3T	3:45:52.6	Report
13	(United Kingdom) Wales Rally GB	(Norway) Ole Christian Veiby	(Norway) Anders Jæger	(Finland) Printsport	Citroën Ds3 R3T	3:36:38.0	Report

== Results and standings ==
Points are awarded to the top ten classified finishers.

Position	1st	2nd	3rd	4th	5th	6th	7th	8th	9th	10th
Points	25	18	15	12	10	8	6	4	2	1

=== FIA WRC3 Championship for Drivers ===
Pos.	Driver	MON (Monaco)	SWE (Sweden)	MEX (Mexico)	ARG (Argentina)	POR (Portugal)	ITA (Italy)	POL (Poland)	FIN (Finland)	GER (Germany)	AUS (Australia)	FRA (France)	ESP (Spain)	GBR (United Kingdom)	Points
1	(France) Quentin Gilbert	1				1		11	1			~~3~~	1	3	115
2	(Norway) Ole Christian Veiby	3	1			5			3			~~6~~	9	1	92
3	(Romania) Simone Tempestini	4				7		1	10			1	4	Ret	81
4	(Italy) Andrea Crugnola					6	2	10		1		2	Ret		70
5	(Italy) Fabio Andolfi					10	3	5	Ret				3	2	59
6	(France) Terry Folb	Ret				13		6	4			~~4~~	2	4	50
7	(Finland) Henri Haapamäki					3		3	2						48
8	(France) Pierre-Louis Loubet					2		Ret	Ret			Ret	7	5	34
9	(Finland) Teemu Suninen					Ret	1		11						25
10	(Italy) Damiano De Tommaso							7	6				5	Ret	24
11	(France) Jean-René Perry					4		EX	5			~~7~~			22
12	(Germany) Christian Riedemann	2													18
13	(United Kingdom) Osian Pryce					Ret		2						WD	18
14	(United Arab Emirates) Mohammed Al Mutawaa					Ret		9	7			Ret	6	Ret	16
15	(Switzerland) Federico Della Casa					8		8	9			Ret	8		14
16	(Italy) Giuseppe Testa					14	4								12
17	(France) Matthieu Margaillan					Ret		4	Ret			Ret			12
18	(France) Stéphane Consani	5													10
19	(France) Yohan Rossel	6										~~5~~			8
20	(Belgium) William Wagner													6	8
21	(Italy) Alessandro Re	7													6
22	(Hungary) Kornél Lukács	8				11									4
23	(Finland) Jari Huttunen								8						4
23	(France) Charlotte Dalmasso	9				12						Ret			2
24	(Republic of Ireland) Daniel McKenna	Ret				9			Ret						2
Pos.	Driver	MON (Monaco)	SWE (Sweden)	MEX (Mexico)	ARG (Argentina)	POR (Portugal)	ITA (Italy)	POL (Poland)	FIN (Finland)	GER (Germany)	AUS (Australia)	FRA (France)	ESP (Spain)	GBR (United Kingdom)	Points

Key
Colour	Result
Gold	Winner
Silver	2nd place
Bronze	3rd place
Green	Points finish
Blue	Non-points finish
Blue	Non-classified finish (NC)
Purple	Did not finish (Ret)
Black	Excluded (EX)
Black	Disqualified (DSQ)
White	Did not start (DNS)
White	Cancelled (C)
Blank	Withdrew entry from the event (WD)

=== FIA WRC3 Championship for Co-Drivers ===
Pos.	Co-driver	MON (Monaco)	SWE (Sweden)	MEX (Mexico)	ARG (Argentina)	POR (Portugal)	ITA (Italy)	POL (Poland)	FIN (Finland)	GER (Germany)	AUS (Australia)	FRA (France)	ESP (Spain)	GBR (United Kingdom)	Points
1	(Belgium) Renaud Jamoul	1				1		11	1			~~3~~	1	3	115
2	(Norway) Anders Jæger	3	1						3			~~6~~	9	1	82
3	(Italy) Matteo Chiarcossi	4				7		1	10			1	4	Ret	81
4	(Italy) Michele Ferrara					6	2	10		1		2	Ret		70
5	(Italy) Simone Scattolin					10	3	5	Ret				3	2	59
6	(France) Franck Le Floch	Ret				13		6	4			~~4~~	2	4	50
7	(Finland) Marko Salminen					3		3	2						48
8	(Finland) Mikko Markkula					Ret	1		11						25
9	(Italy) Massimiliano Bosi							7	6				5	Ret	24
10	(France) Joshua Reibel					4		EX	5						22
11	(Germany) Michael Wenzel	2													18
12	(United Kingdom) Dale Furniss					Ret		2							18
13	(France) Victor Bellotto					2		Ret	Ret						18
14	(France) Vincent Landais											Ret	7	5	16
15	(United Kingdom) Stephen McAuley					Ret		9	7			Ret	6	Ret	16
16	(Italy) Domenico Pozzi					8		8	9				8		14
17	(Italy) Emanuele Inglesi					14	4								12
18	(France) Fabrice Gordon							4	Ret						12
19	(France) Maxime Vilmot	5													10
20	(Norway) Stig Rune Skjærmoen					5									10
21	(France) Benoît Fulcrand	6										~~5~~			8
23	(Belgium) Kevin Parent													6	8
23	(Italy) Giacomo Ciucci	7													6
24	(Hungary) Márk Mesterházi	8				11									4
25	(Finland) Antti Linnaketo								8						4
26	(France) Marine Delon	9													2
27	(Republic of Ireland) Andrew Grennan	Ret				9			Ret						2
Pos.	Co-driver	MON (Monaco)	SWE (Sweden)	MEX (Mexico)	ARG (Argentina)	POR (Portugal)	ITA (Italy)	POL (Poland)	FIN (Finland)	GER (Germany)	AUS (Australia)	FRA (France)	ESP (Spain)	GBR (United Kingdom)	Points

Key
Colour	Result
Gold	Winner
Silver	2nd place
Bronze	3rd place
Green	Points finish
Blue	Non-points finish
Blue	Non-classified finish (NC)
Purple	Did not finish (Ret)
Black	Excluded (EX)
Black	Disqualified (DSQ)
White	Did not start (DNS)
White	Cancelled (C)
Blank	Withdrew entry from the event (WD)

=== FIA WRC3 Championship for Teams ===
Pos.	Team	MON (Monaco)	SWE (Sweden)	MEX (Mexico)	ARG (Argentina)	POR (Portugal)	ITA (Italy)	POL (Poland)	FIN (Finland)	GER (Germany)	AUS (Australia)	FRA (France)	ESP (Spain)	GBR (United Kingdom)	Points
1	(Finland) Printsport	2	1			2			2			~~3~~	3	1	119
2	(Italy) ACI Team Italia					4	3	2	3				1	2	103
3	(France) Team Renault Sport Technologies					3	2	3		1		1	Ret		98
4	(Finland) Hannu's Rally Team					1		1	1						75
5	(France) Team ORECA					Ret	1		6						33
6	(United Arab Emirates) Abu Dhabi Racing					Ret			4			Ret	2	Ret	30
7	(Germany) ADAC Team Weser-Ems	1													25
8	Equipe de France FFSA	3										~~2~~			15
9	(Hungary) Varga Racing Team					5									10
10	AKK Sports Team Finland								5						10
Pos.	Team	MON (Monaco)	SWE (Sweden)	MEX (Mexico)	ARG (Argentina)	POR (Portugal)	ITA (Italy)	POL (Poland)	FIN (Finland)	GER (Germany)	AUS (Australia)	FRA (France)	ESP (Spain)	GBR (United Kingdom)	Points

Key
Colour	Result
Gold	Winner
Silver	2nd place
Bronze	3rd place
Green	Points finish
Blue	Non-points finish
Blue	Non-classified finish (NC)
Purple	Did not finish (Ret)
Black	Excluded (EX)
Black	Disqualified (DSQ)
White	Did not start (DNS)
White	Cancelled (C)
Blank	Withdrew entry from the event (WD)
