= Gaetano Filangieri, 5th Prince of Satriano =

Italian jurist and philosopher

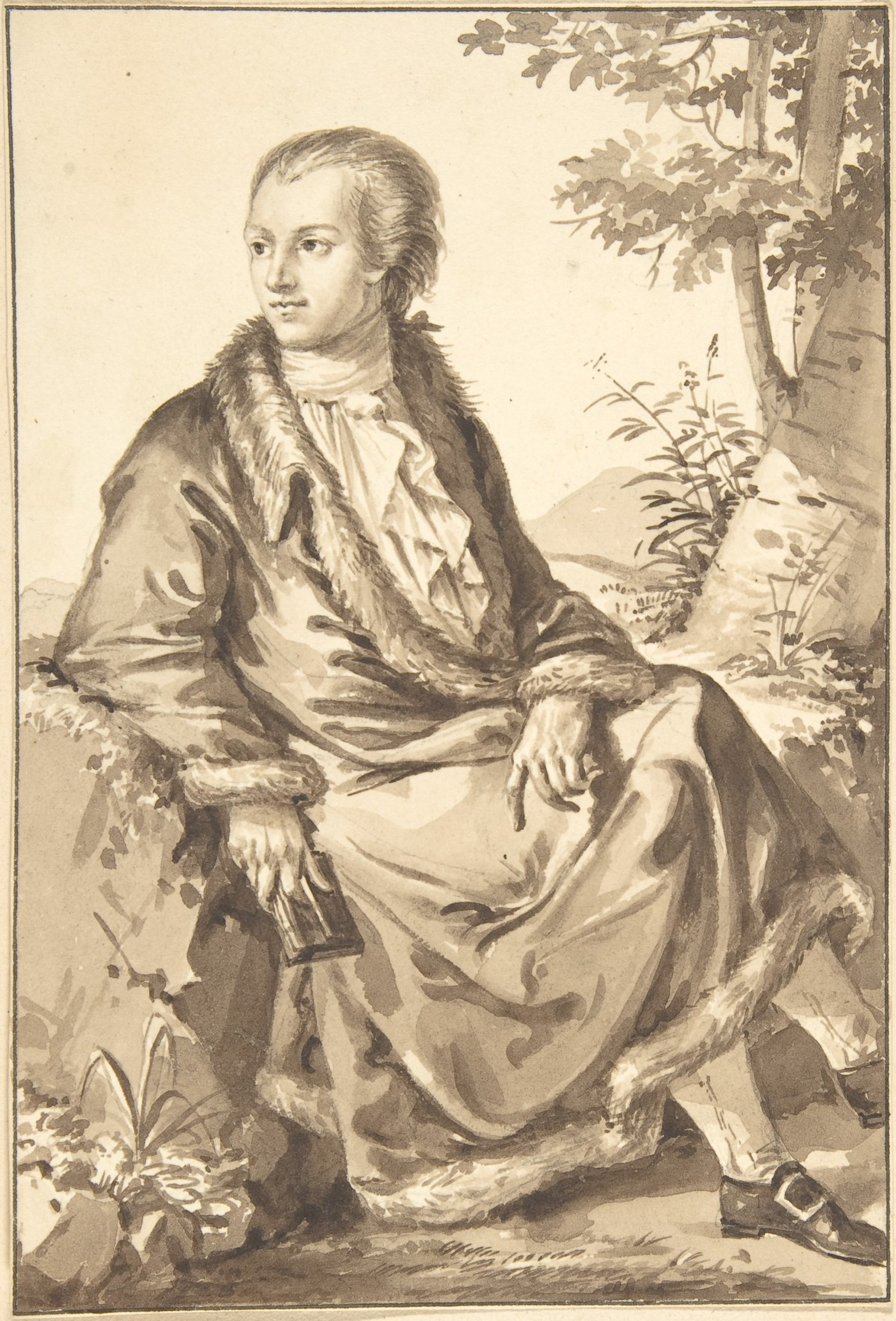
- Portrait of Gaetano Filangieri by Jean-François Bosio, Metropolitan Museum of Art, New York
- Born: August 22, 1753; San Sebastiano al Vesuvio, Kingdom of Naples
- Died: 21 July 1788 (aged 34); Vico Equense, Kingdom of Naples
- Occupations: Jurist and political philosopher
- Known for: La Scienza della Legislazione (1780-1785)
- Title: Prince
- Spouse: Charlotte Frendel (m. 1783)
- Parent(s): Cesare Filangieri and Marianna Filangieri (née Montalto)

Gaetano Filangieri, of the Princes of Arianiello (22 August 1753 – 21 July 1788) was an Italian jurist and philosopher. Highly polemical in regard to the political and legal system of the ancien régime, and opposed to the privilege of the aristocracy and the extreme power of the magistracy, Filangieri fought in favor of a constitutional system based on the rights of man.

== Biography ==
=== Early life and education ===
Filangieri was born in San Sebastiano al Vesuvio, in the Kingdom of Naples. He was born the third son of a sibship of the noble family of Filangieri, which putatively had arrived in Campania with the Norman conquests. His father Caesar, prince of Arianiello, intended him to pursue a military career, which he commenced at the early age of seven, but soon abandoned for the study of the law. At the bar his knowledge and eloquence secured his success. His defence of a royal decree reforming abuses in the administration of justice gained him the favor of the king, Ferdinand IV of Naples, and his prime minister Bernardo Tanucci, and led in 1777 to an appointments at the court, including as maggiordomo di settimana and gentleman of the chamber for the monarch, and a post as officer of a Royal Guard. In 1782, the death of his uncle Serafino Filangieri, the archbishop of Naples, gained for Gaetano a sizable inheritance, allowing him more time to study and writing.

By 1771, the Danish scholar Jakob Jonas Björnståhl, on a visit to Naples, had recorded that Filangieri had shown him an interesting, unedited paper of his on politics and law. In 1774, his first printed work, Riflessioni politiche su l'ultima legge del sovrano, che riguarda la riforma dell'amministrazione della Giustizia (Political reflections on the most recent law of the sovereign, regarding the reform of the administration of justice), appeared in Naples; in it he strongly supported the reforming activity of the minister Bernardo Tanucci and his "dispatches," which obliged judges to provide written justification of their verdicts.

=== La Scienza della Legislazione ===
The first two volumes of his main work, La Scienza della Legislazione, was first published in 1780. The first book contained an exposition of the rules on which legislation in general ought to proceed, while the second was devoted to economic questions. These two books showed him an ardent reformer, and vehement in denouncing the abuses of his time. He insisted on unlimited free trade, and the abolition of the medieval institutions which impeded production and national well-being. Its success was great and immediate not only in Italy, but throughout Europe at large.

Continually reprinted and translated in several languages – by 2003, various editions and translations numbered up to seventy-two – the Scienza has taken its place as one of the greatest classics of the European Enlightenment. Thanks also to the support of the Masonic order (which Filangieri probably joined in 1773), it had vast international success. The Parisian edition of 1821 was supplied with rich commentary by Benjamin Constant, and in many aspects represents a fundamental text for understanding the doctrines of Constant himself and of European liberalism of the early nineteenth century.

=== Later life ===
In 1783, he married, resigned his appointments at court, and retiring to Cava, devoted himself steadily to the completion of his work. In the same year the third book appeared, relating entirely to the principles of criminal jurisprudence. The suggestion which he made in it as to the need for reform in the Catholic Church brought upon him the censure of the ecclesiastical authorities, and it was condemned by the congregation of the Index in 1784. In 1785, he published three additional volumes, making the fourth book of the projected work, and dealing with education and morals.

In 1787, he was appointed a member of the supreme treasury council by Ferdinand I of the Two Sicilies, but his health, impaired by close study and over-work in his new office, compelled his withdrawal to the country at Vico Equense. He died somewhat suddenly of tuberculosis on 21 July 1788, having just completed the first part of the fifth book of his Scienza. He left an outline of the remainder of the work, which was to have been completed in six books. In 1799, during the Neapolitan revolution, his house was sacked by Sanfedist forces and his family was forced into exile. Carlo Filangieri, 6th Prince of Satriano, the soldier and statesman, was his son, and Gaetano Filangieri, 7th Prince of Satriano was his grandson.

== Scholarship and correspondence ==
Fascinated by the American Revolution, Filangieri conducted a written correspondence with Benjamin Franklin. Franklin became Filangieri's ardent admirer, and the two corresponded from 1780 until Filangieri's death in 1788. The originals of the two statesmen's correspondence are preserved at the American Philosophical Society, the Historical Society of Pennsylvania and the Museo Civico Filangieri in Naples. In 1787 Filangieri received a visit from Goethe in his villa in the hills in Cava de' Tirreni (near Naples), to which he had withdrawn in 1783 owing to poor health. Goethe subsequently recalled him with esteem in his Italian Journey and in Wilhelm Meister.

== Works ==
- Riflessioni politiche su l'ultima legge del sovrano, che riguarda la riforma dell'amministrazione della giustizia. Naples: Michele Morelli. 1774.
- La scienza della legislazione. 8 vols. Naples. 1780–1785.
- Eugenio Lo Sardo, ed. (1999). Il mondo nuovo e le virtu civili: l'epistolario di Gaetano Filangieri 1772-1788. Naples: Fridericiana editrice universitaria. ISBN 978-88-8338-001-3.

=== Works in English translation ===
- The Science of Legislation. 2 vols. London: Ostell. 1774.

== Bibliography ==
- This article incorporates text from a publication now in the public domain: Chisholm, Hugh, ed. (1911). "Filangieri, Gaetano". Encyclopædia Britannica. Vol. 10 (11th ed.). Cambridge University Press. p. 339.
- Lo Sardo, Eugenio (1997). "FILANGIERI, Gaetano". Dizionario Biografico degli Italiani (in Italian). Vol. 47: Ferrero–Filonardi. Rome: Institute of the Italian Encyclopaedia. ISBN 978-88-12-00032-6.
- Imbruglia, G.; McCuaig, W. (2002). "Filangieri, Gaetano". Encyclopedia of the Enlightenment. Oxford: Oxford University Press.
- Bedani, G. (2005). "Filangieri, Gaetano". The Oxford Companion to Italian Literature. Oxford: Oxford University Press.
- Mazzacane, A.; Jackson, J. (2009). "Filangieri, Gaetano". The Oxford International Encyclopedia of Legal History. Oxford: Oxford University Press.
- Simon, Fabrizio (2011). "An economic approach to the study of law in the eighteenth century: Gaetano Filangieri and la scienza della legislazione". Journal of the History of Economic Thought. 33 (2): 223–248. doi:10.1017/S1053837211000046.
- Ricci, Saverio (2012). "Filangieri, Gaetano". Il Contributo italiano alla storia del Pensiero: Filosofia. Rome: Istituto dell'Enciclopedia Italiana.
- Giannola, Adriano (2012). "Filangieri, Gaetano". Il Contributo italiano alla storia del Pensiero: Economia. Rome: Istituto dell'Enciclopedia Italiana.
- Salfi, Francesco Saverio (2012). Franco Crispini (ed.). Elogio di Filangieri. Introduction by Valentina Zaffino. Cosenza: Pellegrini. ISBN 978-88-8101-863-5.
