= Luigi Rados =

Italian engraver (1773–1840)

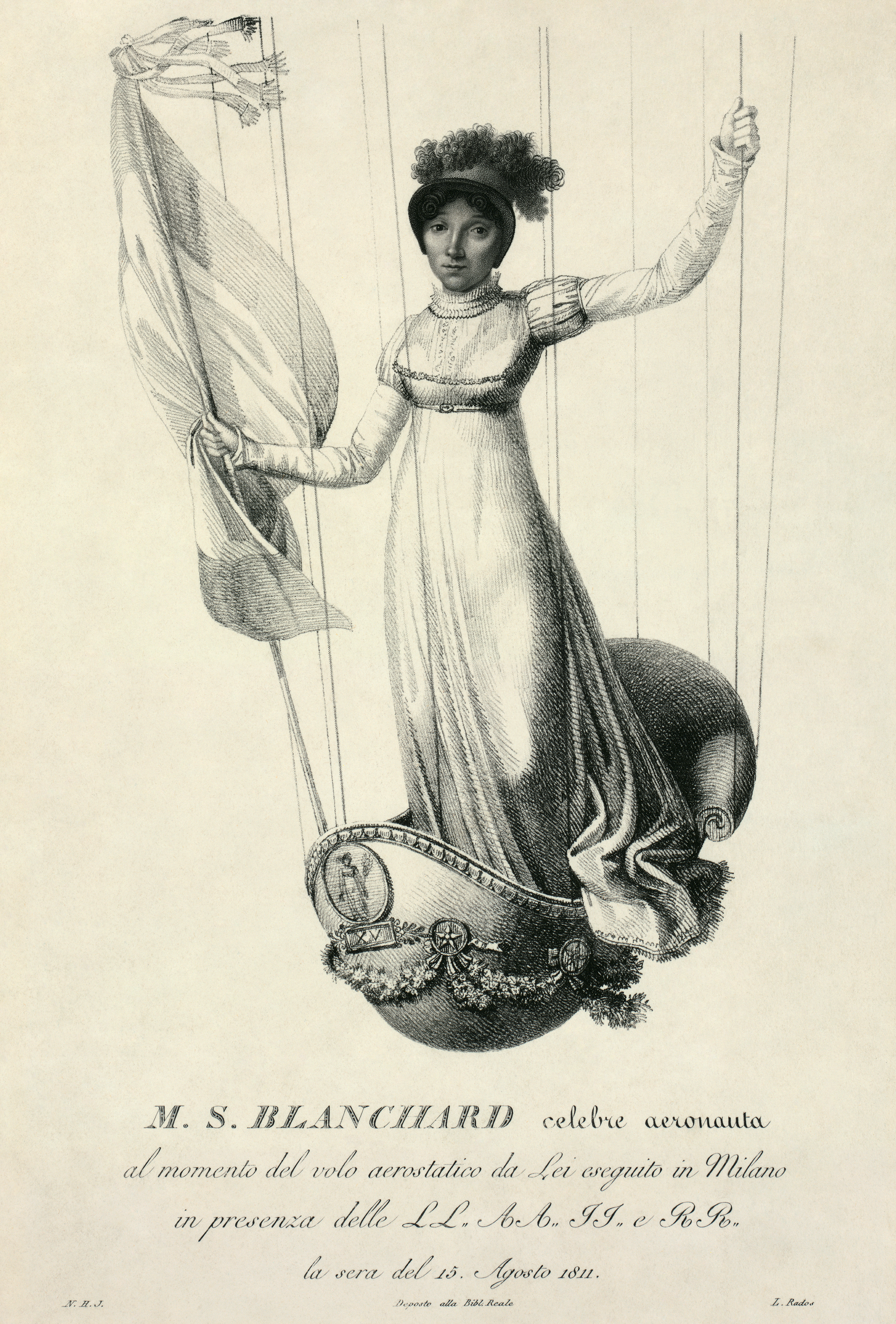
An 1811 engraving of balloonist Sophie Blanchard by Luigi Rados

Luigi Rados (19 October 1773 – 1840) was an Italian engraver.

== Life ==
Rados was born in Parma and educated at the city's academy.

He collaborated extensively with the French painter Jean-François Bosio, who worked under the name Giovanni Battista Bosio while in Milan under the French occupation. Rados' plates after Bosio include a portrait of the French viceroy Eugène de Beauharnais (1807) and illustrations for an updated Milanese equivalent of Carracci's Cries of Bologna, published under the title of I costumi di Milano e suoi circondari. Rados also engraved many of the portraits drawn by Bosio for the second volume of the Serie di vite e ritratti de' famosi personaggi degli ultimi tempi, a three-volume collection of illustrated biographies published in Milan between 1815 and 1818.

== Sources ==
- Bryan, Michael (1889). Walter Armstrong; Robert Edmund Graves (eds.). Dictionary of Painters and Engravers, Biographical and Critical. Vol. II L–Z. London: George Bell and Sons. p. 336.
- Draper, James David (1978). "Thirty Famous People: Drawings by Sergent-Marceau and Bosio, Milan, 1815–1818". Metropolitan Museum Journal. 13: 113–130. doi:10.2307/1512715. JSTOR 1512715. S2CID 193088155.
- Norris, Christopher (1975). "The Tempio Della Santissima Trinità at Mantua". The Burlington Magazine: 73–79.
