= Giuseppe Testa =

Italian surgeon (1819–1894)

Giuseppe Testa (30 June 1819, Martina Franca – 14 December 1894, Naples) was an Italian surgeon.

He studied in Naples where he graduated in medicine and surgery at the age of 21.

He was well known for the successful surgical operation on Carlo Filangieri's leg, saving him from a gangrene which would have brought certain amputation. His surgical clinic became the most important in Naples; it was attended by many students and in 1876 he became a professor of surgery at Naples University.

Testa was also a member of the "Medical-Surgical Royal Academy".
