= Jean-François Bosio =

French artist (1764–1827)

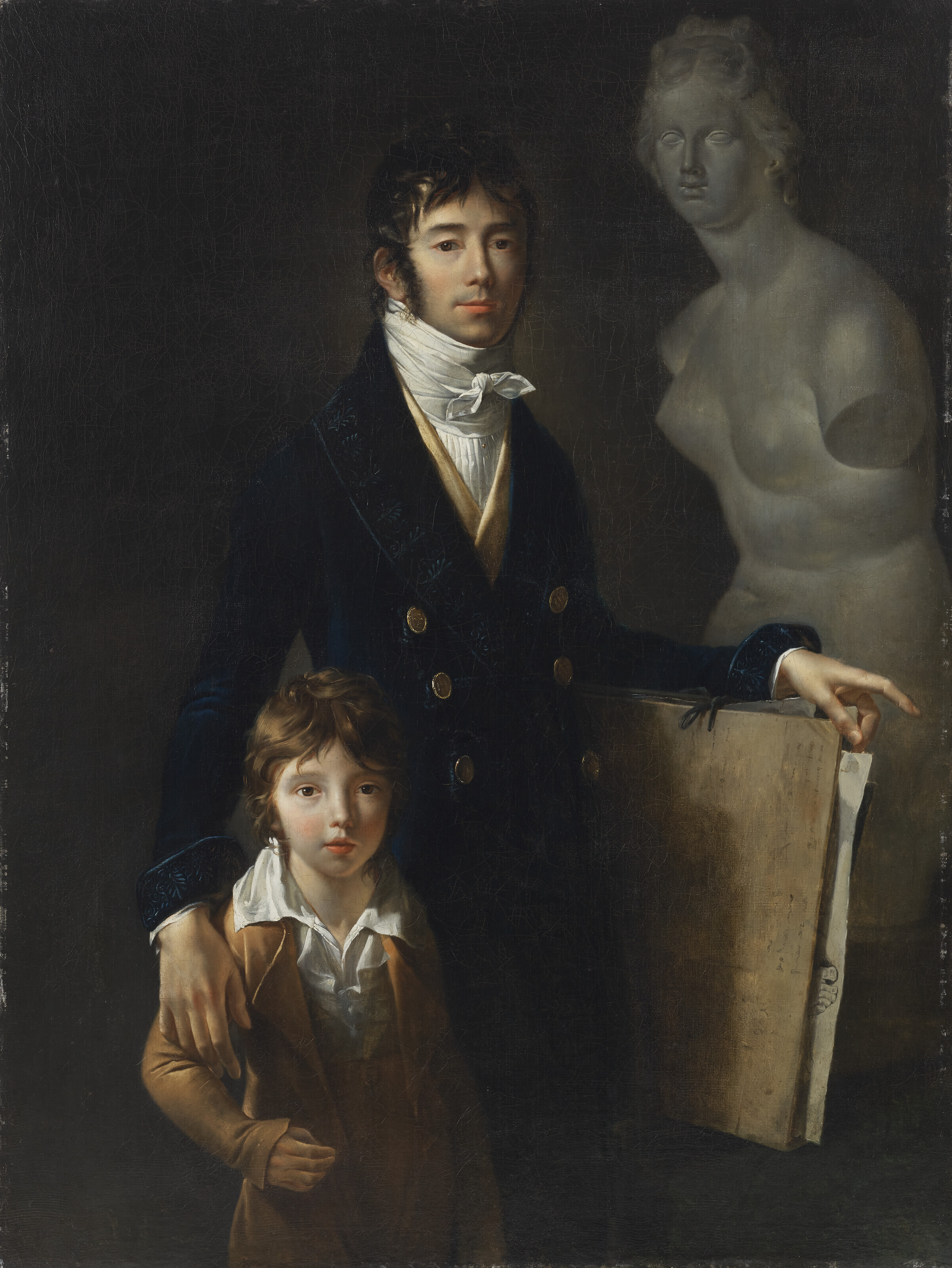
Self-portrait of Jean Baptiste François Bosio with his son Astyanax Scaevola Bosio, circa 1801

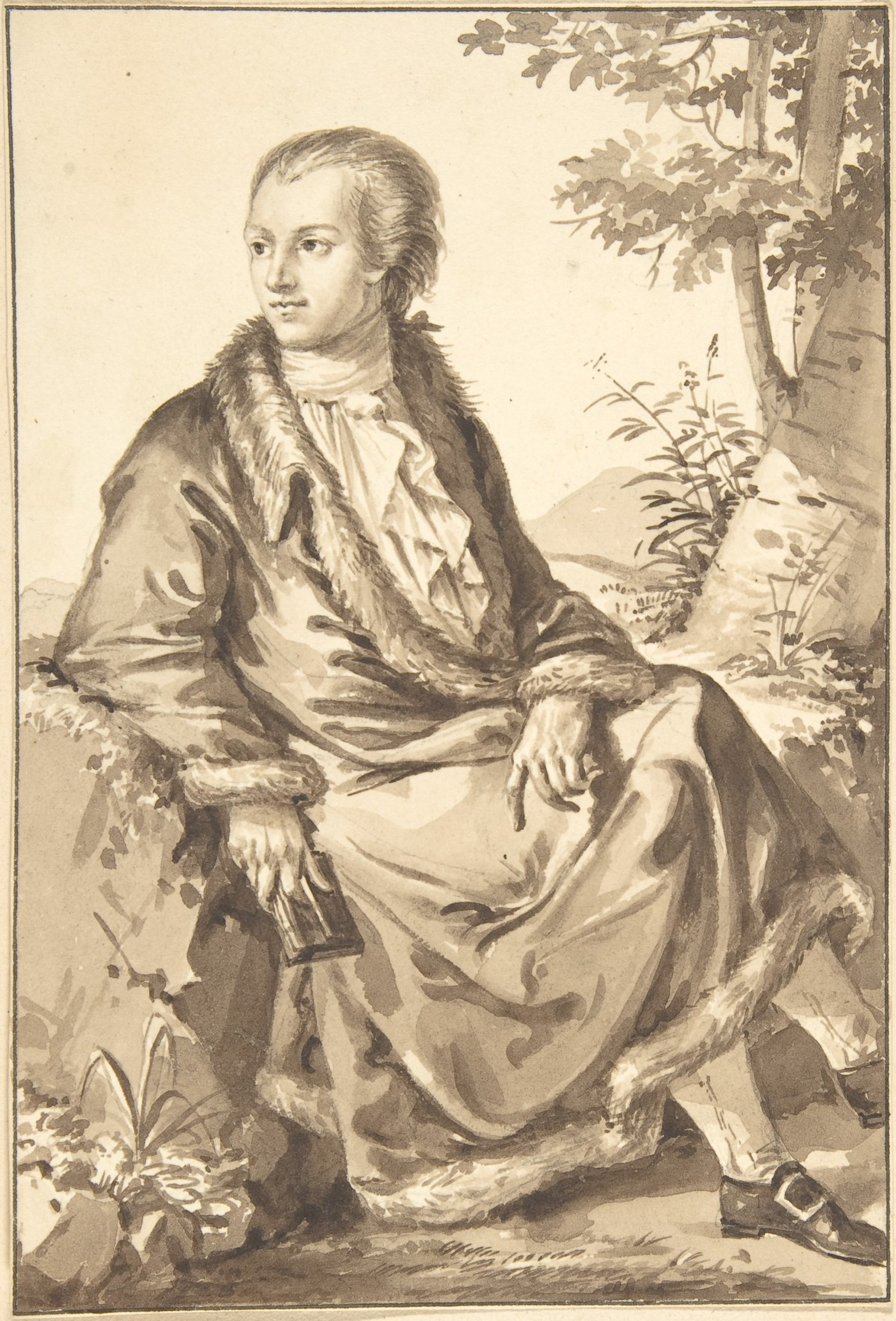
Portrait of Gaetano Filangieri by Jean-François Bosio

Jean-François Bosio (1764–1827) was a French artist, born in Monaco. He spent some time in Milan, where he used the name Giovanni Battista Bosio.

== Life ==
Bosio was born in Monaco and studied under David. He contributed a considerable number of works to the Salon of 1793, including genre portraits, one depicting his wife playing the piano, and historical works. He showed rather fewer works in the salons of 1798, 1801 and 1804. A drawing of 1801, showing a dog demonstrating card tricks at a party, demonstrates the element of caricature in his work.

He was in Milan by 1807. His works there included a portrait of the French viceroy, Eugène de Beauharnais, and a large painting of the triumphal entry of General Domenico Pino into Milan through the Porta Romana in February 1806. He worked extensively in collaboration with the engraver Luigi Rados, who made plates of his portrait of Beauharnais, and engraved his I costumi di Milano e suoi circondar, a series of illustrations creating a modern Milanese equivalent version of Carracci's Cries of Bologna. He was a major contributor to the Serie di vite e ritratti de'famosi personaggi degli ultimi tempi, a three-volume collection of illustrated biographies published in Milan between 1815 and 1818. Working from existing likenesses, Bosio provided almost all the drawings for the first volume, and about half of those in the second. An inscription on a plate in the third volume indicates that he had already returned to Paris by the time it was drawn.

Following his return to France he drew genre scenes which were engraved for the Journal des Dames (1817), and portraits of soldiers which appeared in a Galerie militaire (1818). He showed three pictures, including a Death of the Virgin, at the Salon of 1819, and a full-length portrait Louis XVIII, painted for the Palais de Justice at Rouen, in 1822. He exhibited at the Salon of 1824 for the last time, and died in 1827.

He wrote a drawing manual (Traité Élémentaire Des Règles Du Dessin), published in 1801, and held the chair of drawing at the Ecole Polytechnique.

His younger brother François Joseph Bosio was a successful sculptor, who was eventually created a baron by Charles X.

== Sources ==
- Draper, James David (1978). "Thirty Famous People: Drawings by Sergent-Marceau and Bosio, Milan, 1815–1818". Metropolitan Museum Journal. 13: 113–130. doi:10.2307/1512715. JSTOR 1512715. S2CID 193088155.
