= 2015 Rally Italia Sardegna =

Auto racing event in Italy

2015 Rally Italia Sardegna Rally Italia Sardegna 2015
Round 6 of the 2015 World Rally Championship season
← Previous event	Next event →
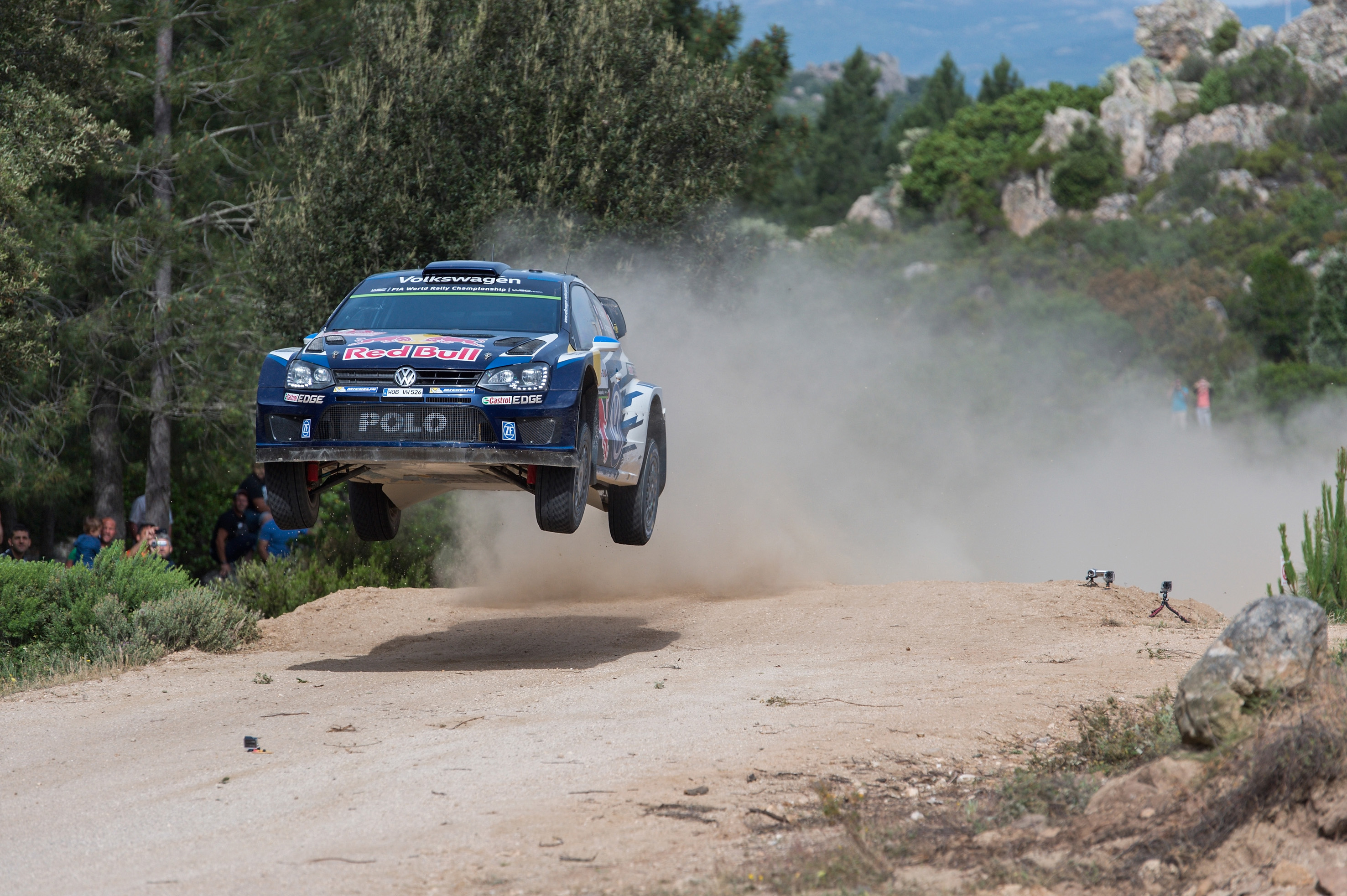
- Host country: Italy
- Rally base: Alghero, Sardinia
- Dates run: June 11 – June 14, 2015
- Stages: 23 (394.63 km; 245.21 miles)
- Stage surface: Gravel
- Overall distance: 1,553.11 km (965.06 miles)

Overall results
- Overall winner: (France) Sébastien Ogier (France) Julien Ingrassia (Germany) Volkswagen Motorsport

The 2015 Rally Italia Sardegna, held on Sardinia, was the sixth round of the 2015 World Rally Championship season. Sébastien Ogier obtained its fourth victory in this season.

== Entry list ==
WRC
No.	Entrant	Driver	Co-Driver	Car	Tyre
1	(Germany) Volkswagen Motorsport	(France) Sebastien Ogier	(France) Julien Ingrassia	Volkswagen Polo R WRC	MI
2	(Germany) Volkswagen Motorsport	(Finland) Jari-Matti Latvala	(Finland) Miikka Anttila	Volkswagen Polo R WRC	MI
3	(France) Citroen Total Abu Dhabi WRT	(United Kingdom) Kris Meeke	(Republic of Ireland) Paul Nagle	Citroen DS3 WRC	MI
4	(France) Citroen Total Abu Dhabi WRT	(Norway) Mads Ostberg	(Sweden) Jonas Andersson	Citroen DS3 WRC	MI
5	(United Kingdom) M-Sport World Rally Team	(United Kingdom) Elfyn Evans	(United Kingdom) Daniel Barritt	Ford Fiesta RS WRC	MI
6	(United Kingdom) M-Sport World Rally Team	(Estonia) Ott Tänak	(Estonia) Raigo Mõlder	Ford Fiesta RS WRC	MI
7	(South Korea) Hyundai Motorsport	(Belgium) Thierry Neuville	(Belgium) Nicolas Gilsoul	Hyundai i20 WRC	MI
8	(South Korea) Hyundai Motorsport	(Spain) Dani Sordo	(Spain) Marc Marti	Hyundai i20 WRC	MI
9	(Germany) Volkswagen Motorsport II	(Norway) Andreas Mikkelsen	(Norway) Ola Floene	Volkswagen Polo R WRC	MI
20	(South Korea) Hyundai Motorsport N	(New Zealand) Hayden Paddon	(New Zealand) John Kennard	Hyundai i20 WRC	MI
21	(Czech Republic) Jipocar Czech National Team	(Czech Republic) Martin Prokop	(Czech Republic) Jan Tománek	Ford Fiesta RS WRC	P
37	(Italy) FWRT s.r.l.	(Italy) Lorenzo Bertelli	(Italy) Lorenzo Granai	Ford Fiesta RS WRC	P
WRC
12	(France) Citroen Total Abu Dhabi WRT	(United Arab Emirates) Khalid Al-Qassimi	(United Kingdom) Chris Patterson	Citroen DS3 WRC	MI
14	(Poland) RK World Rally Team	(Poland) Robert Kubica	(Poland) Maciej Szczepaniak	Ford Fiesta RS WRC	P
WRC 2
31	(Saudi Arabia) Yazeed Racing	(Saudi Arabia) Yazeed Al-Rajhi	(United Kingdom) Michael Orr	Ford Fiesta RRC	P
32	(France) PH Sport	(France) Stephane Lefebvre	(Belgium) Stéphane Prévot	Citroen DS3 RRC	MI
36	(Estonia) ME3 Rally Team	(Estonia) Karl Kruuda	(Estonia) Martin Järveoja	Citroen DS3 R5	P
38	(Ukraine) Yuriy Protasov	(Ukraine) Yuriy Protasov	(Ukraine) Pavlo Cherepin	Ford Fiesta RRC	P
39	Youth & Sports Qatar Rally Team	(Qatar) Abdulaziz Al-Kuwari	(United Kingdom) Marshall Clarke	Ford Fiesta RRC	P
40	(Ukraine) Eurolamp WRT	(Ukraine) Valeriy Gorban	(Ukraine) Volodymyr Korsia	Mini Cooper S2000 1.6T	P
41	(Peru) Nicolas Fuchs	(Peru) Nicolas Fuchs	(Argentina) Fernando Mussano	Ford Fiesta R5	DM
42	(Qatar) Nasser Al-Attiyah	(Qatar) Nasser Al-Attiyah	(France) Mathieu Baumel	Ford Fiesta RRC	MI
43	(Czech Republic) Skoda Motorsport	(Finland) Esapekka Lappi	(Finland) Janne Ferm	Skoda Fabia R5	MI
44	(Germany) BRR Baumschlager Rallye & Racing Team	(Germany) Armin Kremer	(Germany) Pirmin Winklhofer	Skoda Fabia R5	P
45	(Czech Republic) Skoda Motorsport	(Czech Republic) Jan Kopecky	(Czech Republic) Pavel Dresler	Skoda Fabia R5	MI
47	(France) Julien Maurin	(France) Julien Maurin	(France) Nicolas Klinger	Ford Fiesta RRC	P
48	(Italy) F.P.F Sport	(Italy) Paolo Andreucci	(Italy) Anna Andreussi	Peugeot 208 T16	P
50	(France) Team Oreca	(France) Eric Camilli	(France) Benjamin Veillas	Ford Fiesta R5	MI
52	(Romania) Napoca Rally Academy	(Italy) Simone Tempestini	(Italy) Matteo Chiarcossi	Mitsubishi Lancer Evo IX	P
73	(Portugal) ACSM Rallye Team	(Portugal) Bernardo Sousa	(Portugal) Hugo Magalhães	Peugeot 208 T16	HK
74	(Chile) RMC Motorsport	(Chile) Ramon Torres Fuentes	(Spain) David Vazquez Liste	Ford Fiesta R5	
76	(Argentina) Geronimo Padilla	(Argentina) Geronimo Padilla	(Argentina) Edgardo Galindo	Ford Fiesta R5	
77	(Australia) Scott Pedder	(Australia) Scott Pedder	(Australia) Dale Moscatt	Ford Fiesta R5	
78	(Republic of Ireland) Eamonn Boland	(Republic of Ireland) Eamonn Boland	(Republic of Ireland) Joseph Morrissey Michael	Subaru Impreza WRX STI	
79	(Italy) Gianluca Linari	(Italy) Gianluca Linari	(Italy) Nicola Arena	Subaru Impreza STI N15	
80	(Portugal) ACSM Rallye Team	(Andorra) Joan Carchat	(Andorra) Claudi Ribeiro Leite	Mitsubishi Lancer Evo X	HK
81	(Italy) Enrico Brazzoli	(Italy) Enrico Brazzoli	(Italy) Maurizio Barone	Subaru Impreza STI N15	
WRC 3
69	(France) Renault Sport Technologies	(Italy) Andrea Crugnola	(Italy) Michele Ferrara	Renault Clio RS R3T	
70	(France) Team Oreca	(Finland) Teemu Suninen	(Finland) Mikko Markkula	Citroen DS3 R3T Max	
71	(Italy) ACI Team Italia	(Italy) Fabio Andolfi	(Italy) Simone Scattolin	Peugeot 208 R2	P
72	(Italy) ACI Team Italia	(Italy) Giuseppe Testa	(Italy) Emanuele Inglesi	Peugeot 208 R2	P
Other
83	[[]]	[[]]	[[]]	Ford Fiesta R5	
84	[[]]	[[]]	[[]]	Ford Fiesta R5	
85	[[]]	[[]]	[[]]	Skoda Fabia S2000	
86	[[]]	[[]]	[[]]	Ford Fiesta RRC	
87	[[]]	[[]]	[[]]	Ford Fiesta R5	
88	[[]]	[[]]	[[]]	Subaru Impreza STI N15	
89	[[]]	[[]]	[[]]	[[]]	
92	[[]]	[[]]	[[]]	[[]]	
93	[[]]	[[]]	[[]]	[[]]	
94	[[]]	[[]]	[[]]	[[]]	
96	[[]]	[[]]	[[]]	[[]]	
97	[[]]	[[]]	[[]]	Ford Fiesta R5	DM

== Report ==
The rally began with a surprising Martin Prokop winning the Super Special Stage of Cagliari, followed by Dani Sordo (penalized for false start) and Mikkelsen. On the second day, new surprise with Hayden Paddon winning the first Friday 3 sections, and at the end of SS 4 led the rally with 25.3 s lead over Latvala and Ogier on 27.5. In the remaining stages, Paddon controlled the pace, but a slight touch on the last stage reduced the advantage to only 8.8 s, now on Ogier who had exceeded his teammate. Dani Sordo was forced to leave after booting a wheel while Neuville suffered from problems such as turbo and handbrake and finished 6th. Meeke gave-up at SS 2 and Kubica did the same on the next.

It was necessary to reach the SS 17 and a spinning from Paddon for a VW take the rally lead. Ostberg was third, despite having traveled 20 km with a slow tyre leakage, having won 2 PEC before having new slow tyre leakage in the last SS. In this day Mikkelsen (lost a wheel) Sordo (lack of gas pressure), Kubica (3 holes and a stuck gearbox) and Tänak (gearbox jammed when he was 3rd place) dropped out while there were many hardships to Neuville (whipping-top, turbo and steering problems and 40s penalty) and Latvala (hole and crashed shock absorber for 2 sections). At the end of the day Ogier had a huge advantage over Paddon (2m13s) while Ostberg was 3 to 3m25s and Neuville 4th at 3m57s.

For the last day the attention was concentrated in the fight for the last podium spot between Ostberg and Neuville. An outwit from Ostberg (dropped to 5) delivered the 3rd to the Belgian. The power-stage was completely dominated by VW: Ogier, Latvala and Mikkelsen.

== Special stages ==
Day	Stage number	Stage name	Length	Stage winner	Car No.	Team	Time	Rally leader
11 Jun	SS1	(Italy) Citta' Di Cagliari	2.50 km	(Czech Republic) Martin Prokop (Czech Republic) Jan Tománek	21	(Czech Republic) Jipocar Czech National Team	2:23.7	(Czech Republic) Martin Prokop (Czech Republic) Jan Tománek
12 Jun	SS2	(Italy) Grighine Sud 1	26.31 km	(New Zealand) Hayden Paddon (New Zealand) John Kennard	20	(Germany) Hyundai Motorsport N	18:15.0	(New Zealand) Hayden Paddon (New Zealand) John Kennard
12 Jun	SS3	(Italy) Grighine Nord 1	18.34 km	(New Zealand) Hayden Paddon (New Zealand) John Kennard	20	(Germany) Hyundai Motorsport N	13:48.1	(New Zealand) Hayden Paddon (New Zealand) John Kennard
12 Jun	SS4	(Italy) Montiferru 1	14.41 km	(New Zealand) Hayden Paddon (New Zealand) John Kennard	20	(Germany) Hyundai Motorsport N	9:47.4	(New Zealand) Hayden Paddon (New Zealand) John Kennard
12 Jun	SS5	(Italy) Sagama 1	2.58 km	(France) Sébastien Ogier (France) Julien Ingrassia	1	(Germany) Volkswagen Motorsport	2:09.6	(New Zealand) Hayden Paddon (New Zealand) John Kennard
12 Jun	SS6	(Italy) Sagama 2	2.58 km	(Finland) Jari-Matti Latvala (Finland) Miikka Anttila	2	(Germany) Volkswagen Motorsport	2:07.0	(New Zealand) Hayden Paddon (New Zealand) John Kennard
12 Jun	SS7	(Italy) Sinis - Mont' E Prama	14.08 km	(Estonia) Ott Tänak (Estonia) Raigo Mõlder	6	(United Kingdom) M-Sport World Rally Team	7:48.7	(New Zealand) Hayden Paddon (New Zealand) John Kennard
12 Jun	SS8	(Italy) Grighine Sud 2	22.45 km	(Finland) Jari-Matti Latvala (Finland) Miikka Anttila	2	(Germany) Volkswagen Motorsport	15:20.9	(New Zealand) Hayden Paddon (New Zealand) John Kennard
12 Jun	SS9	(Italy) Grighine Nord 2	18.34 km	(France) Sébastien Ogier (France) Julien Ingrassia	1	(Germany) Volkswagen Motorsport	13:29.7	(New Zealand) Hayden Paddon (New Zealand) John Kennard
12 Jun	SS10	(Italy) Montiferru 2	14.41 km	(Finland) Jari-Matti Latvala (Finland) Miikka Anttila	2	(Germany) Volkswagen Motorsport	9:28.9	(New Zealand) Hayden Paddon (New Zealand) John Kennard
13 Jun	SS11	(Italy) Ittiri Arena 1	1.40 km	(France) Sébastien Ogier (France) Julien Ingrassia	1	(Germany) Volkswagen Motorsport	1:28.8	(New Zealand) Hayden Paddon (New Zealand) John Kennard
13 Jun	SS12	(Italy) Monti di Ala' 1	22.49 km	(Finland) Jari-Matti Latvala (Finland) Miikka Anttila	2	(Germany) Volkswagen Motorsport	13:51.2	(New Zealand) Hayden Paddon (New Zealand) John Kennard
13 Jun	SS13	(Italy) Coiluna-Loelle 1	36.69 km	(Norway) Mads Østberg (Sweden) Jonas Andersson	4	(France) Citroën Total Abu Dhabi WRT	24:04.1	(New Zealand) Hayden Paddon (New Zealand) John Kennard
13 Jun	SS14	(Italy) Monte Lerno 1	42.22 km	(Finland) Jari-Matti Latvala (Finland) Miikka Anttila	2	(Germany) Volkswagen Motorsport	28:37.4	(New Zealand) Hayden Paddon (New Zealand) John Kennard
13 Jun	SS15	(Italy) Ozieri-Ardara	7.23 km	(Finland) Jari-Matti Latvala (Finland) Miikka Anttila	2	(Germany) Volkswagen Motorsport	4:00.9	(New Zealand) Hayden Paddon (New Zealand) John Kennard
13 Jun	SS16	(Italy) Ittiri Arena 2	1.40 km	(Belgium) Thierry Neuville (Belgium) Nicolas Gilsoul	7	(Germany) Hyundai Motorsport	1:30.0	(New Zealand) Hayden Paddon (New Zealand) John Kennard
13 Jun	SS17	(Italy) Monti di Ala' 2	22.49 km	(France) Sébastien Ogier (France) Julien Ingrassia	1	(Germany) Volkswagen Motorsport	13:38.9	(France) Sébastien Ogier (France) Julien Ingrassia
13 Jun	SS18	(Italy) Coiluna-Loelle 2	36.69 km	(Norway) Mads Østberg (Sweden) Jonas Andersson	4	(France) Citroën Total Abu Dhabi WRT	23:51.7	(France) Sébastien Ogier (France) Julien Ingrassia
13 Jun	SS19	(Italy) Monte Lerno 2	42.22 km	(France) Sébastien Ogier (France) Julien Ingrassia	1	(Germany) Volkswagen Motorsport	28:01.5	(France) Sébastien Ogier (France) Julien Ingrassia
14 Jun	SS20	(Italy) Olmedo monte Baranta 1	11.13 km	(New Zealand) Hayden Paddon (New Zealand) John Kennard	20	(Germany) Hyundai Motorsport N	8:10.7	(France) Sébastien Ogier (France) Julien Ingrassia
14 Jun	SS21	(Italy) Cala Flumini 1	11.77 km	(France) Sébastien Ogier (France) Julien Ingrassia	1	(Germany) Volkswagen Motorsport	7:36.3	(France) Sébastien Ogier (France) Julien Ingrassia
14 Jun	SS22	(Italy) Olmedo monte Baranta 2	11.13 km	(Finland) Jari-Matti Latvala (Finland) Miikka Anttila	2	(Germany) Volkswagen Motorsport	7:56.3	(France) Sébastien Ogier (France) Julien Ingrassia
14 Jun	SS23	(Italy) Cala Flumini 2 (Power Stage)	11.77 km	(France) Sébastien Ogier (France) Julien Ingrassia	1	(Germany) Volkswagen Motorsport	7:15.9	(France) Sébastien Ogier (France) Julien Ingrassia
