= Museo Civico Filangieri =

Coordinates: 40°50′56″N 14°15′39″E

Filangieri Civic Museum
- Museo Civico Filangieri
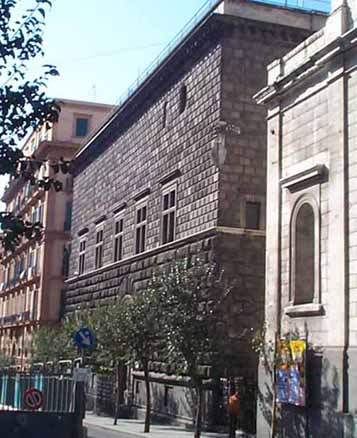
- Palazzo Cuomo façade.
- Established: 1888
- Location: Naples, Italy
- Type: Art museum

The Museo Civico Filangieri ("Filangieri civic museum") is an eclectic collection of artworks, coins, and books assembled in the nineteenth century by Gaetano Filangieri, prince of Satriano, who gave it to the city of Naples as a museum. It is housed in his former palace, Palazzo Cuomo (or Como) on Via Duomo, by the church of San Severo al Pendino.

== History ==
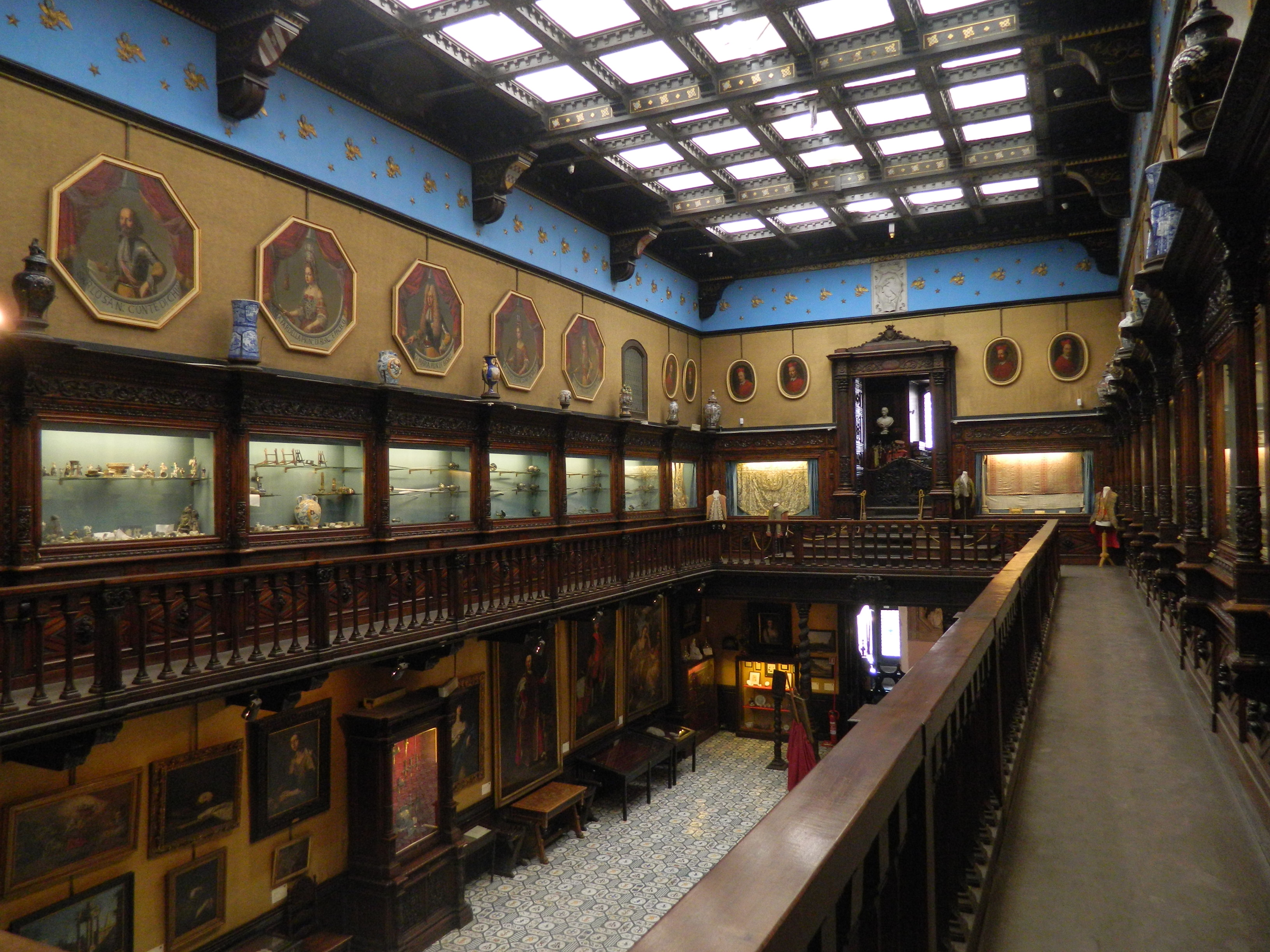
Palace Interior.

Palazzo Cuomo is in Renaissance style with an ashlar stone façade. It was built between 1464 and 1490 by the Florentine Giuliano da Maiano for a wealthy merchant, Angelo Como (or Cuomo). It was sold in 1587 and was incorporated into an adjacent monastery. In 1881–82, during the urban renewal of Naples, the entire building was dismantled and moved back some 20 meters to widen the street. The museum was inaugurated in 1888 by Gaetano Filangieri Junior (1824–92), principe di Satriano. Much of the collection was destroyed by the retreating German troops during September 1943. Since then works from other Neapolitan sites were subsequently incorporated to form a new collection. In recent decades, the museum has often been plagued with extended closures. Many of the exhibits are temporarily on display in the Maschio Angioino.

Among the artists with paintings in the Museum are Jusepe de Ribera, Bernardino Luini, Fedele Fischetti, Francesco Solimena, Francesco Jerace, Lorenzo Vaccaro, Filippo Tagliolini, Gesualdo Gatti, and Luca della Robbia.
