= San Severo al Pendino =

Church of San Severo al Pendino
- Chiesa di San Severo al Pendino
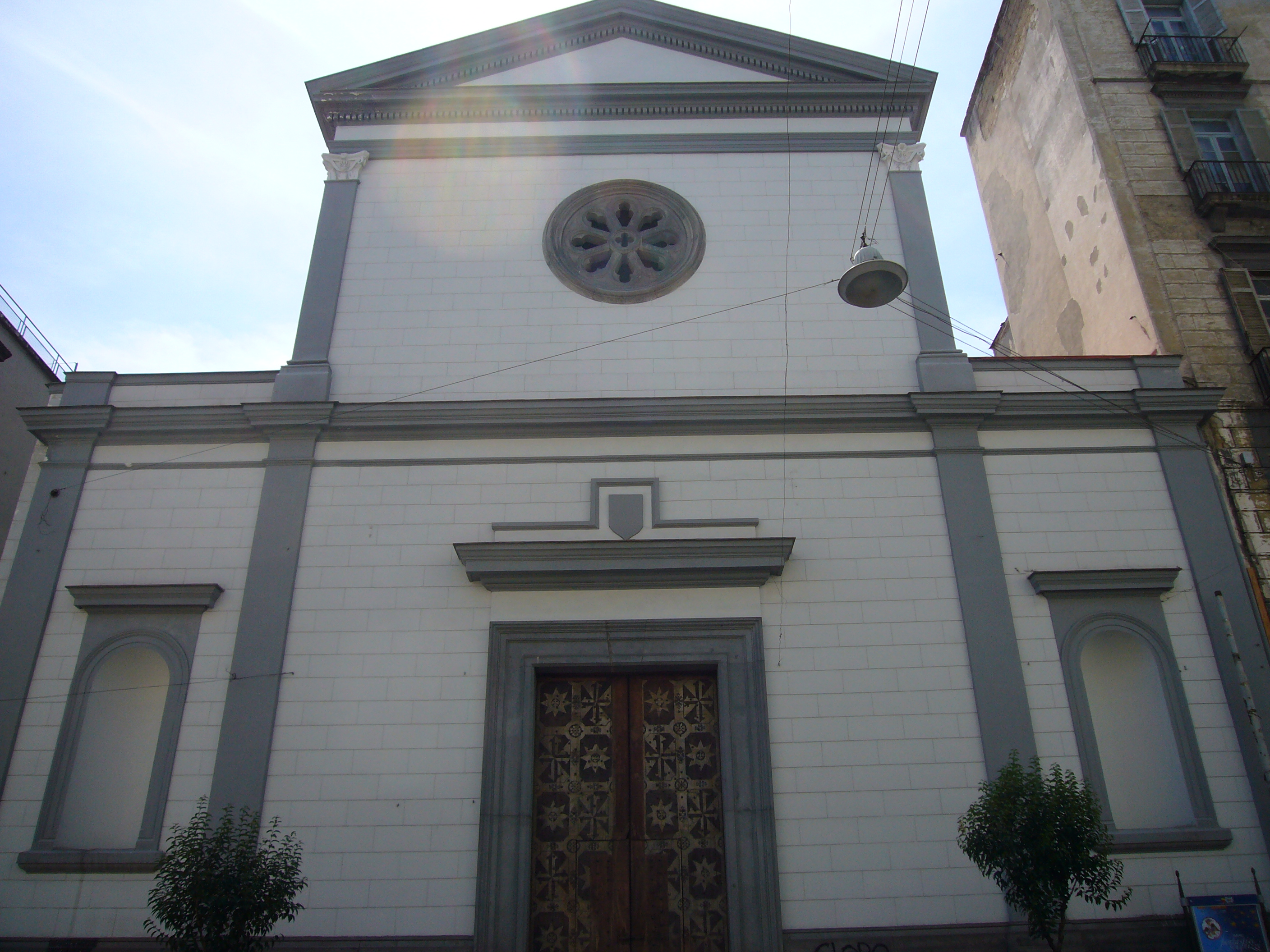
- The façade of San Severo al Pendino.
- Church of San Severo al Pendino
- 40.849155°N 14.2605051°E
- Location: Via Duomo; Naples; Province of Naples, Campania
- Country: Italy
- Denomination: Roman Catholic

Architecture
- Architectural type: Church
- Style: Renaissance architecture
- Groundbreaking: 1599
- Completed: 1845

San Severo al Pendino is a former Roman Catholic church, located on Via Duomo, just south of San Giorgio Maggiore and adjacent to the Museo Civico Gaetano Filangieri, in central Naples, Italy.

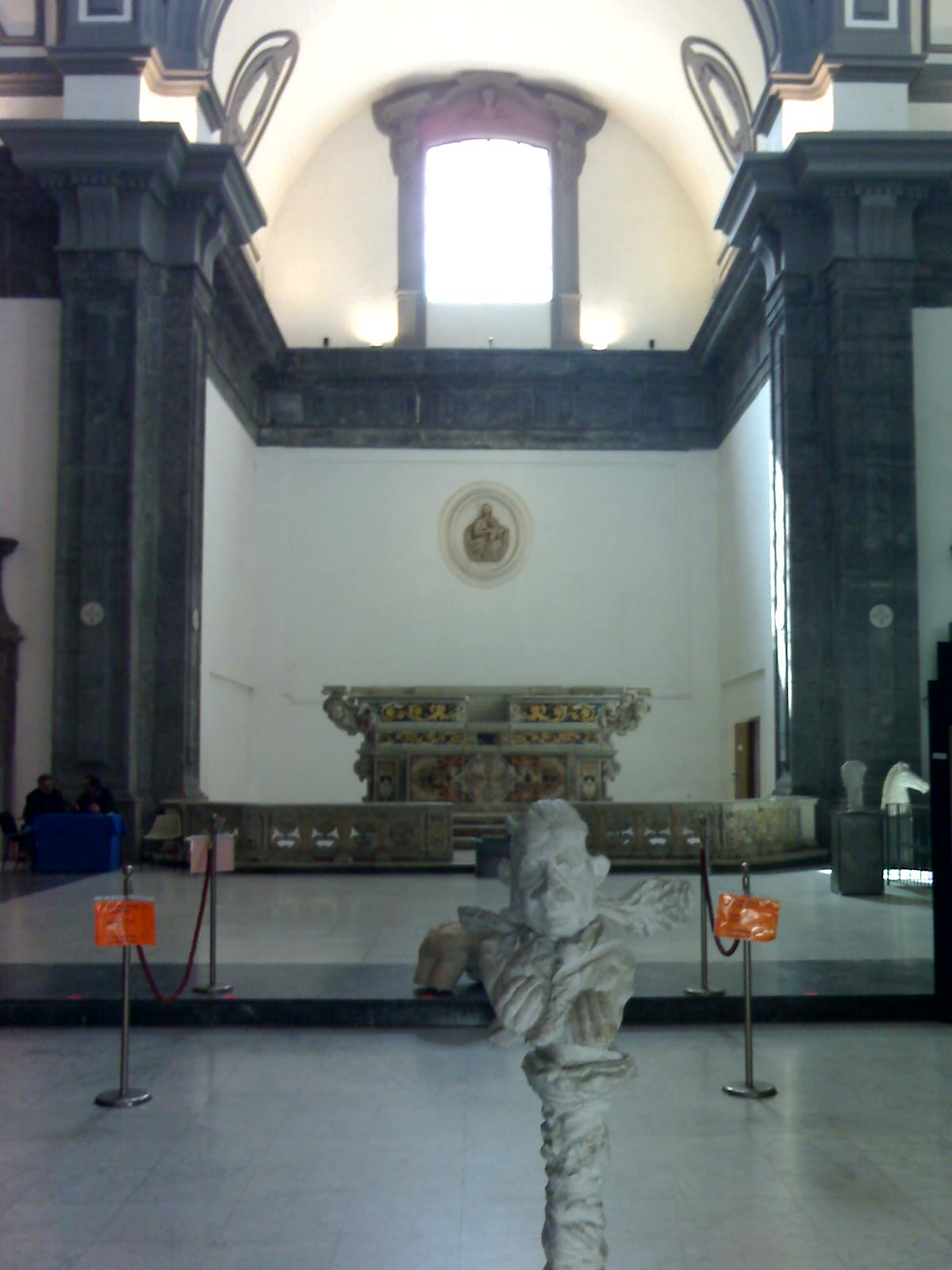
Nave

== History ==
The church was founded in 1448 at the same time as the hospital of Pietro Caracciolo, who had been the abbot of the nearby church of San Giorgio Maggiore. The original name was Santa Maria a Selice.

In 1550 the church was ceded to the Dominican Order which in 1587 acquired the nearby Palazzo Como to use as a convent. From 1599 to 1620 the church underwent major reconstruction by Giovan Giacomo Di Conforto, which give the building a late-mannerist style. Later in the 18th century, it was decorated with Baroque touches, including the staircase with finely sculpted balustrade.

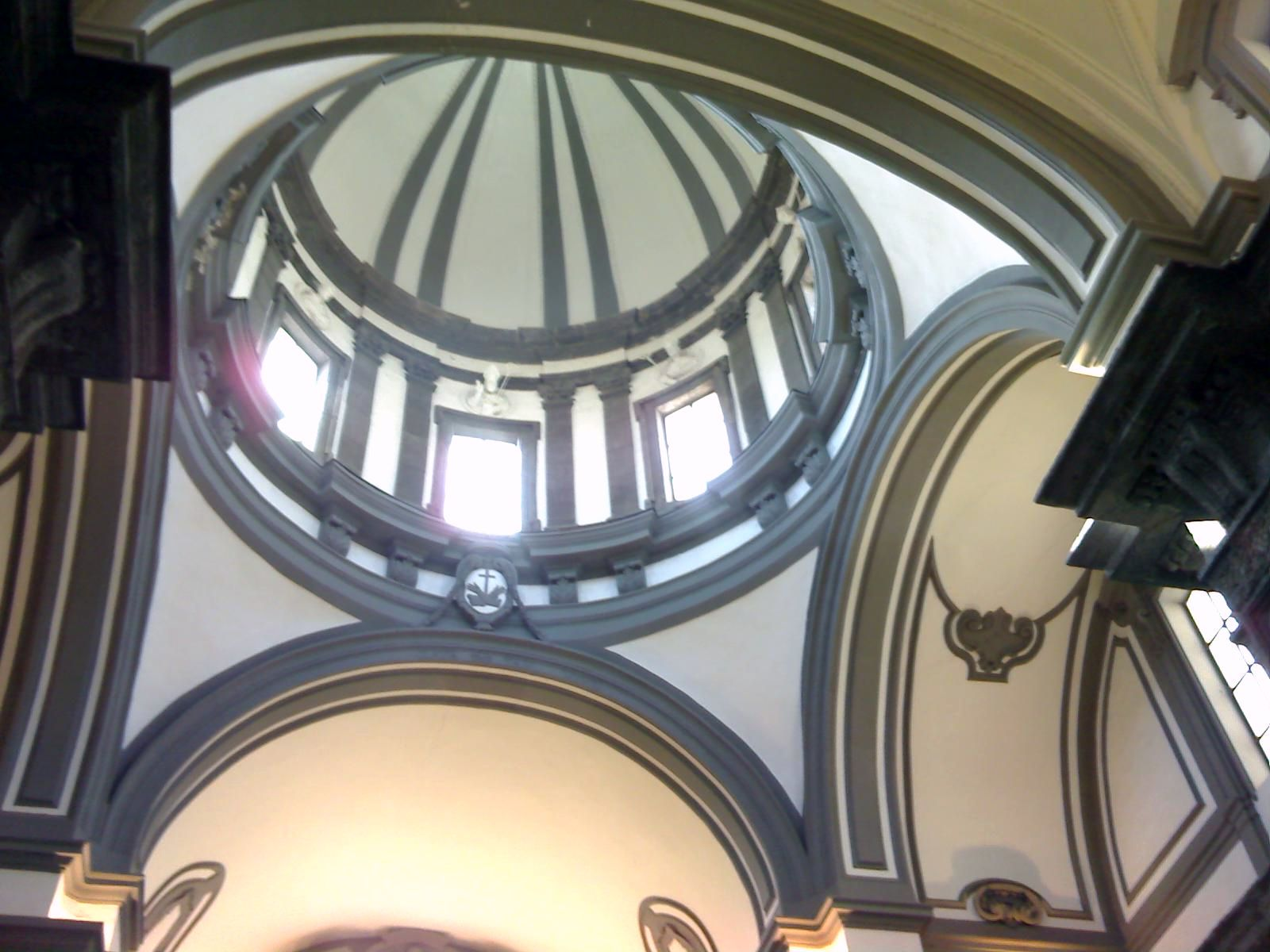
Interior with cupola

In 1818 the building became the first home of the State Archives of Naples, then, with the return of the Dominicans, the complex was rebuilt in 1845 by Filippo Botta, but in 1863 the convent was suppressed and building was used as a retirement home. The reworking of the Via Duomo shortened the nave, and deprived the church of its baroque facade and its first two chapels. The front now has a simpler Renaissance style facade. During the Second World War, the church was used as a bomb shelter, but it was damaged by the 1980 earthquake. The church has been since restored, though deconsecrated and used for exhibitions and conferences.

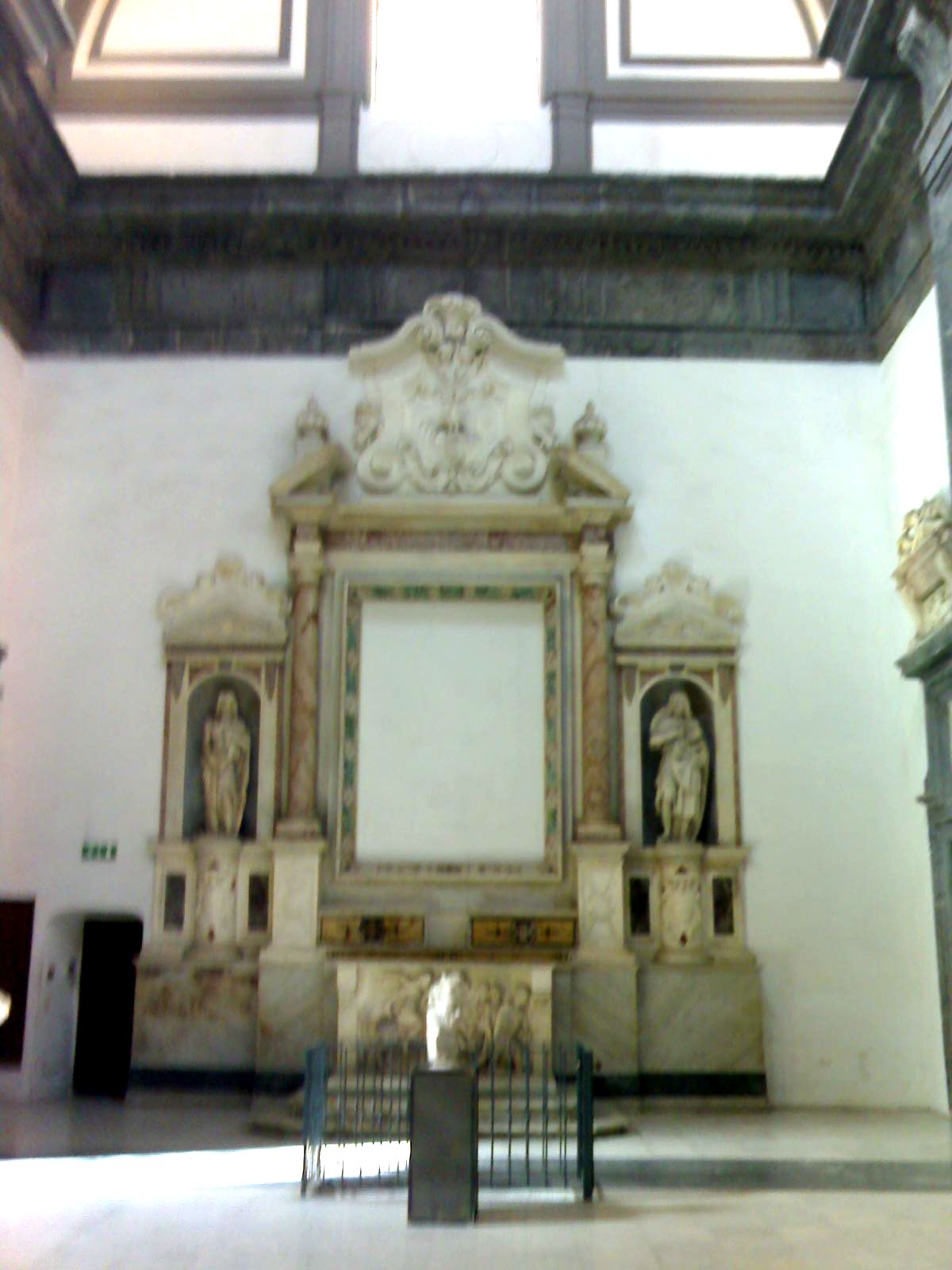
Tomb of Giovanni Alfonso Bisvallo

The interior has a Greek plan, and 17th century decoration. The altar is made of polychrome marble, while the transept to the right has the funereal monument of Giovanni Alfonso Bisvallo, sculpted by Girolamo D'Auria in 1617, which originally had a canvas by Luca Giordano.

== See also ==
- Churches in Naples

== Bibliography ==
- Vincenzo Regina, Le chiese di Napoli. Viaggio indimenticabile attraverso la storia artistica, architettonica, letteraria, civile e spirituale della Napoli sacra, Newton and Compton editor, Naples 2004.
- Francesco Domenico Moccia e Dante Caporali, NapoliGuida-Tra Luoghi e Monumenti della città storica, Clean Edition, 2001
- Gennaro Aspreno Galante, Le Chiese di Napoli. Guida Sacra della Città di Napoli, Naples, 19th century.
