= Gaetano Filangieri, 7th Prince of Satriano =

Neapolitan art historian and collector

Gaetano Filangieri 7th Prince of Satriano 2nd Duke of Taormina
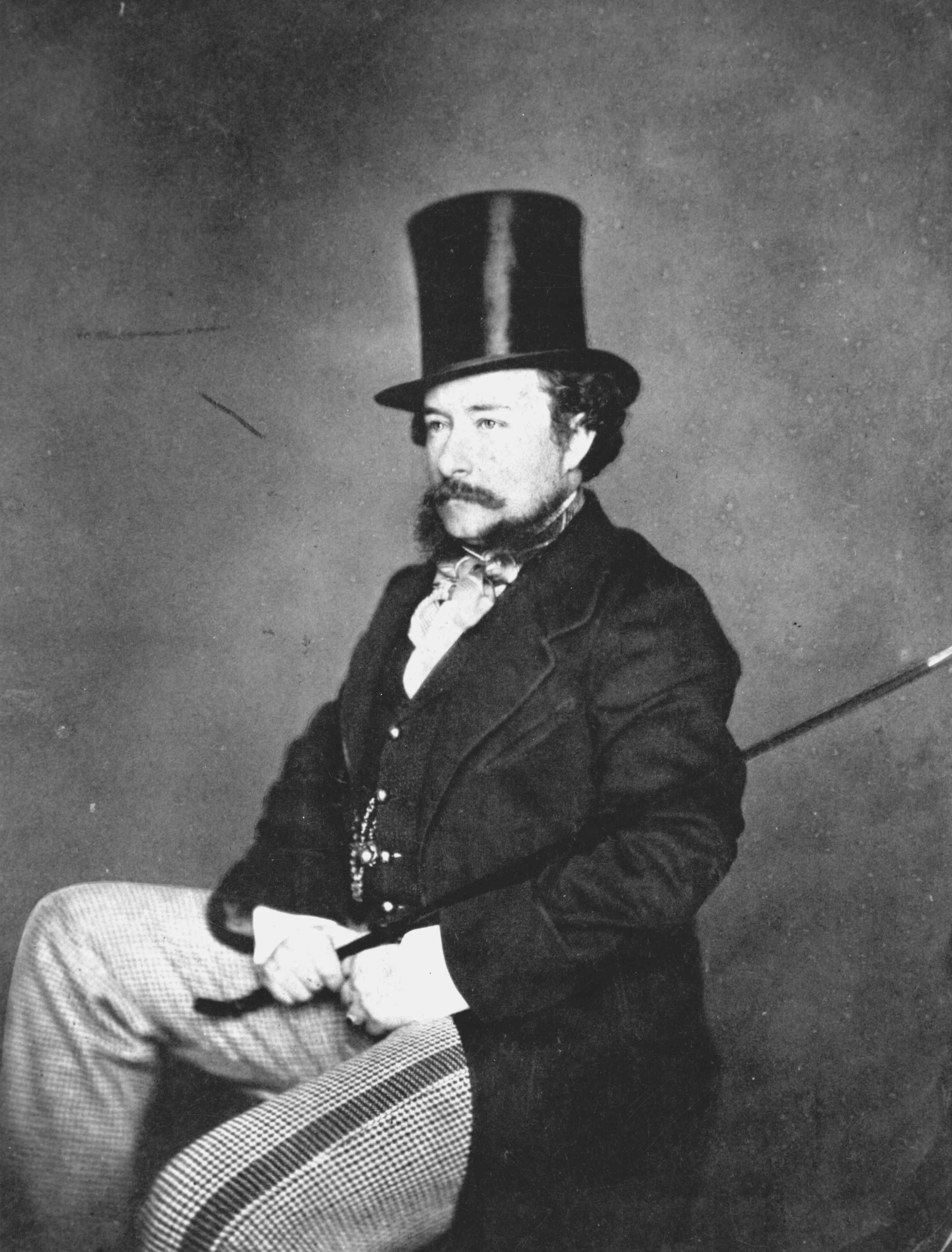
- Born: 8 February 1824; Naples, Kingdom of the Two Sicilies
- Died: 29 November 1892 (aged 68); Naples, Kingdom of Italy
- Noble family: Filangieri
- Father: Carlo Filangieri
- Mother: Agata Moncada di Paternò

Gaetano Filangieri, 7th Prince of Satriano and 2nd Duke of Taormina (8 February 1824 – 29 November 1892) was an art historian and collector who founded the Museo Civico Filangieri. He lived in the Kingdom of the Two Sicilies and then in the Kingdom of Italy.

== Early life ==
Filangieri was born in Naples on 8 February 1824 into the prominent Neapolitan noble Filangieri family. He was the only son of Carlo Filangieri, 6th Prince of Satriano, 1st Duke of the Cardinal, 1st Duke of Taormina and Agata Moncada di Paternò Ventimiglia del Bosco. His paternal grand-father was the illustrious Gaetano Filangieri of the Princes of Arianello.

== Career ==
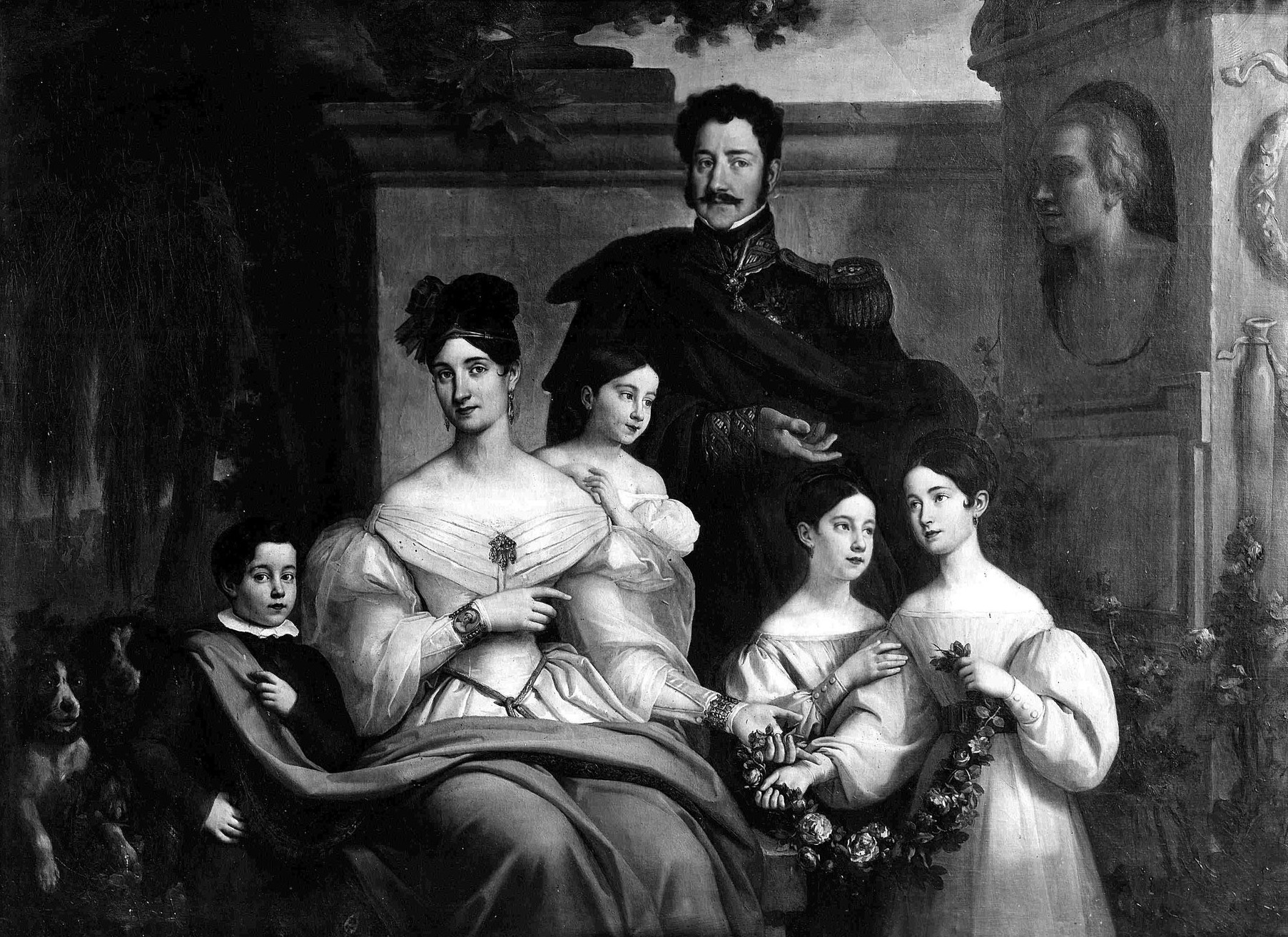
Carlo Filangieri, Prince of Satriano, his wife Agata Moncada and their four children, including Gaetano Filangieri

An avid art collector, he inherited the titles of Prince of Satriano in Calabria and Duke of Taormina upon his father's death on 9 October 1867.

Filangieri was committed to the study of the city's history, and was strongly linked to the Neapolitan Society of National History (Italian: Società Napoletana di Storia Patria), today housed in the Castel Nuovo, of which he was a very active member and served as vice president. He was also a prolific author of articles on historical-artistic subjects. He was also a director of the Consulta Araldica.

In 1883, he purchased the façade of the Palazzo Como, which was due to be partially demolished to open up Via Duomo. The façade was moved back twenty meters in line with the road axis. Filangieri also paid for the renovation of the building's interior. He also decided that it would be the building where all the works of art he had collected would be placed. The building was donated to the Municipality to be used as a museum, which was inaugurated in 1888 as the Museo Civico Filangieri, of which he was president. His work was pursued by his grand-nephew Riccardo Filangieri di Candida Gonzaga.

== Personal life ==
Filangieri was a Knight Hospitaller of Saint John of Jerusalem and of Order of Saint Januarius and a Grand Cross of the Order of Saint Ferdinand.

Filangieri died in Naples on 29 November 1892. After his death, his estate was divided between his two surviving sisters and the two daughters of his sister who predeceased him. The succession to the titles of Prince of Satriano and Duke of Taormina went to the De Riseis family, through his niece, Maddalena Guevara Suardo di Bovino, the daughter of his eldest sister Carolina. His other surviving sister, Teresa, had married Vincenzo Ravaschieri Fieschi, Duke of Roccapiemonte.
