= San Giorgio Maggiore, Naples =

Church in Naples, Italy

Coordinates: 40.849670°N 14.260630°E

San Giorgio Maggiore is a basilica church located on the corner of Via vicaria Vecchia and Via Duomo, in central Naples, Italy. The apse of the church lies diagonally across the street from San Severo al Pendino.

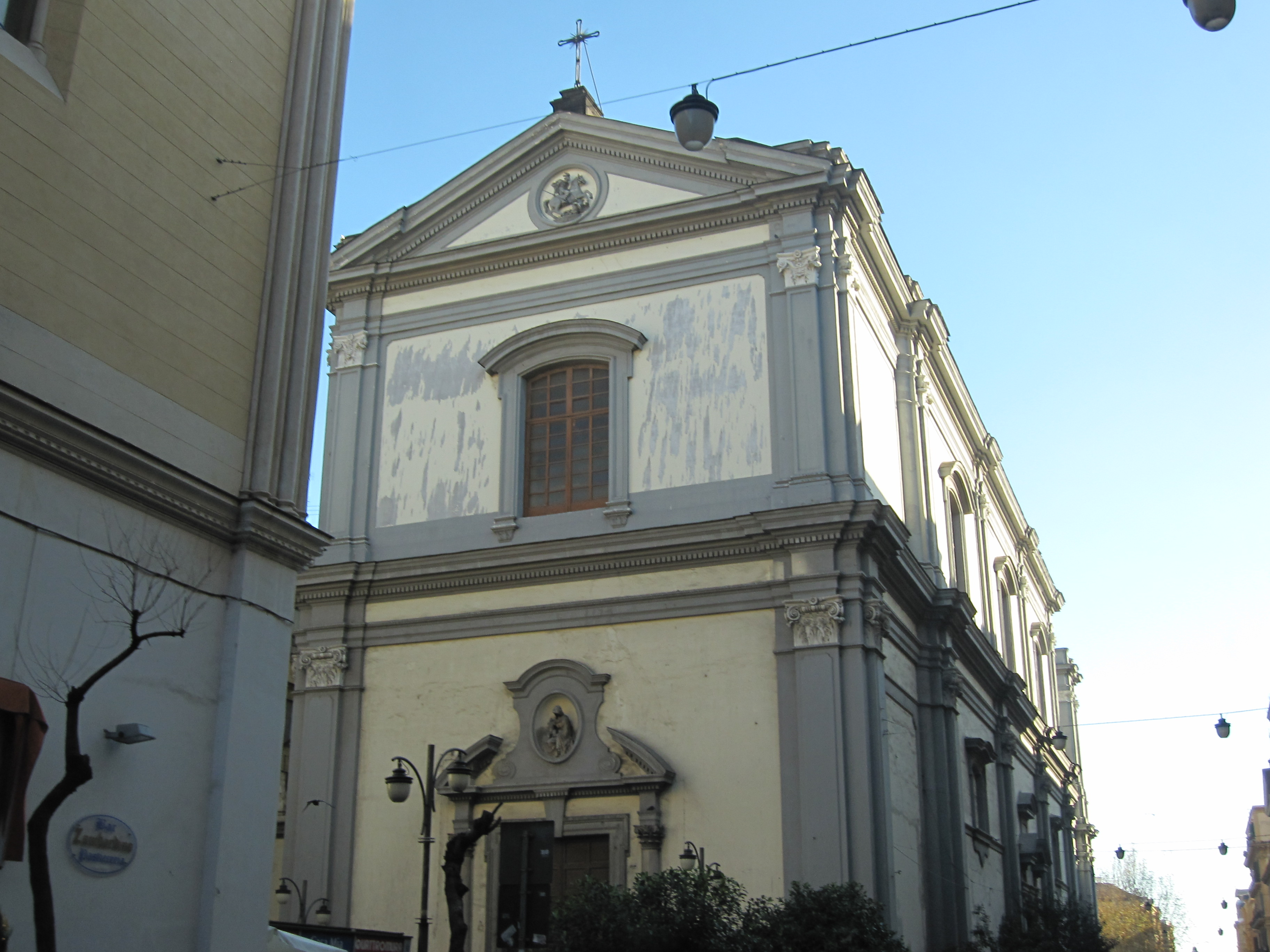
The facade of the church

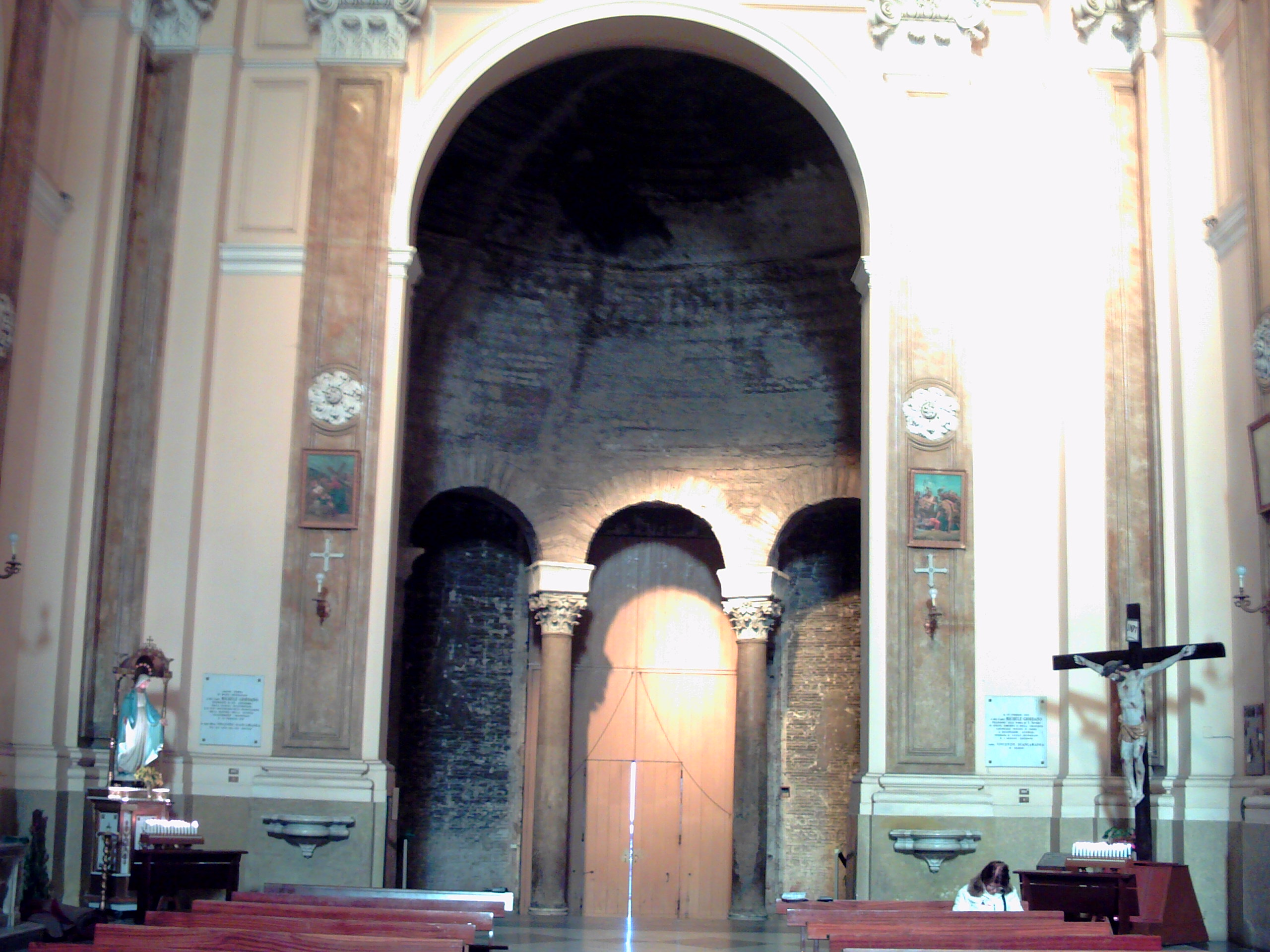
Paleochristian Apse, modern entry to church

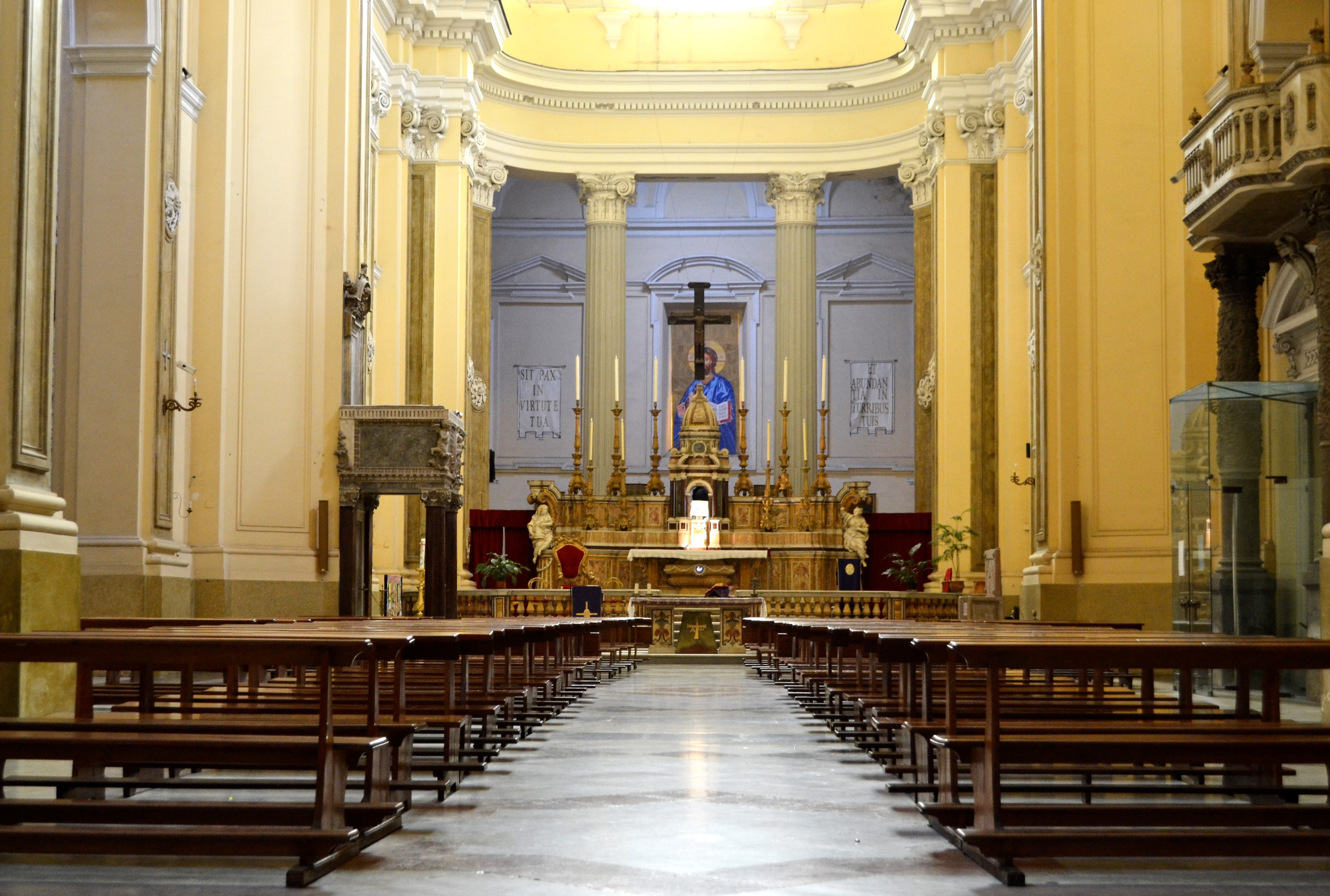
The church's nave

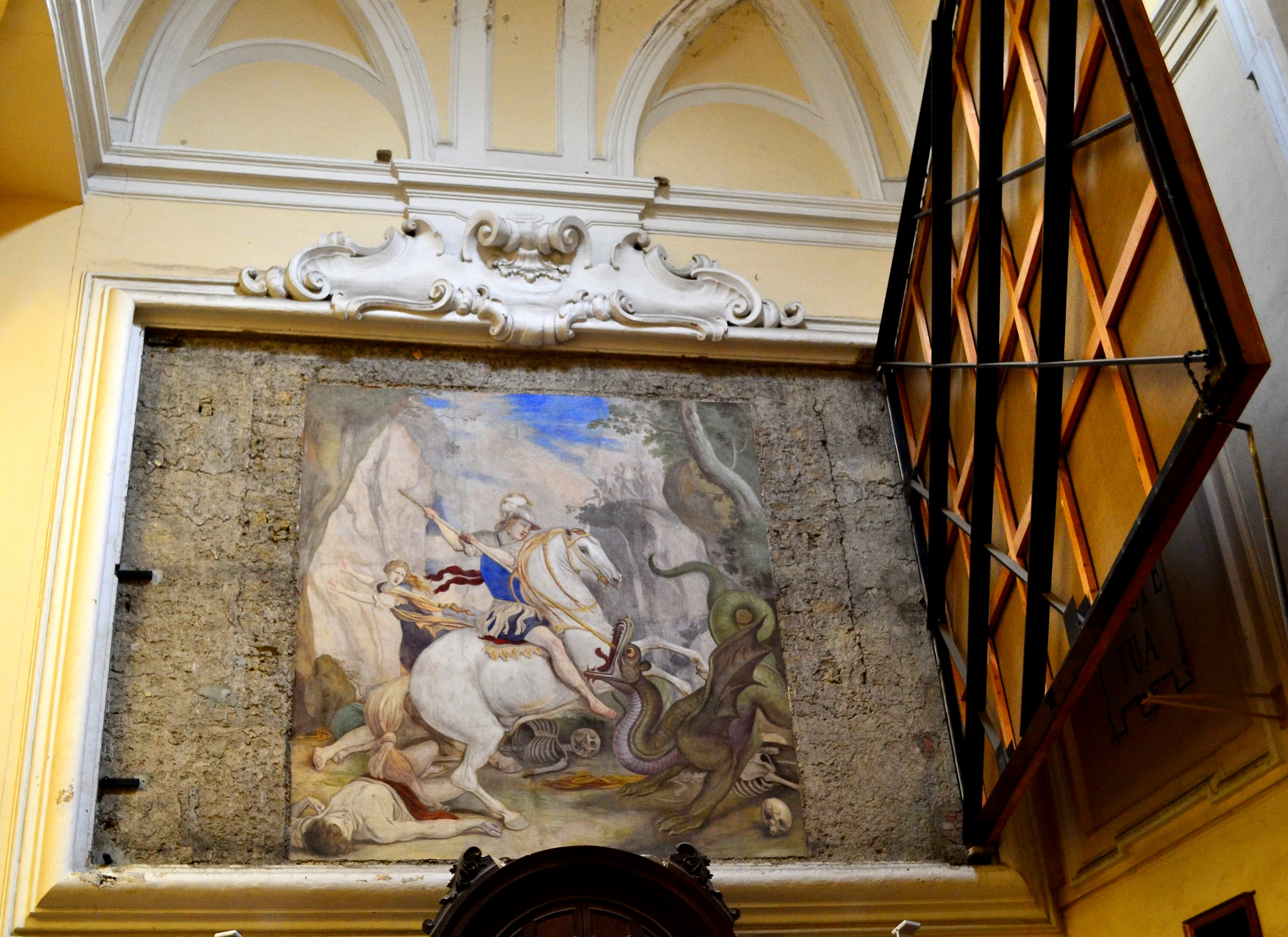
Frescoes inside the church

A church at the site was built by the 4th century, and was initially known as "la severiana", after the bishop San Severo of Naples. The present name dates to the 9th century, and is dedicated to a martyred warrior in the battles against the Lombards. In 1640, a fire destroyed part of the church, and reconstruction followed plans by Cosimo Fanzago, who inverted the orientation. The present church's entrance is the former apse of the primitive church. After 1694, it was rebuilt after an earthquake. Cosimo Fanzago transferred into this church some of the granite columns from the nearby church of Santa Maria degli Angeli alle Croci. During the 19th century Risanamiento, when certain streets in Naples were being widened, the nave on the right side of the church was eliminated to widen Via Duomo. Near the lateral door of the church is the marble seat, constructed from spolia, of St Severus, founder of the church. In the left of main altar of the church are frescoes painted by a young Solimena. The church also holds a painting in Byzantine style, a wooden crucifix from the 13th century, and the relics of St Severus. The church has canvases by Camillo Lionti and Francesco Peresi.
