= Carlo Filangieri, 6th Prince of Satriano =

Neapolitan soldier and statesman

Carlo Filangieri 6th Prince of Satriano
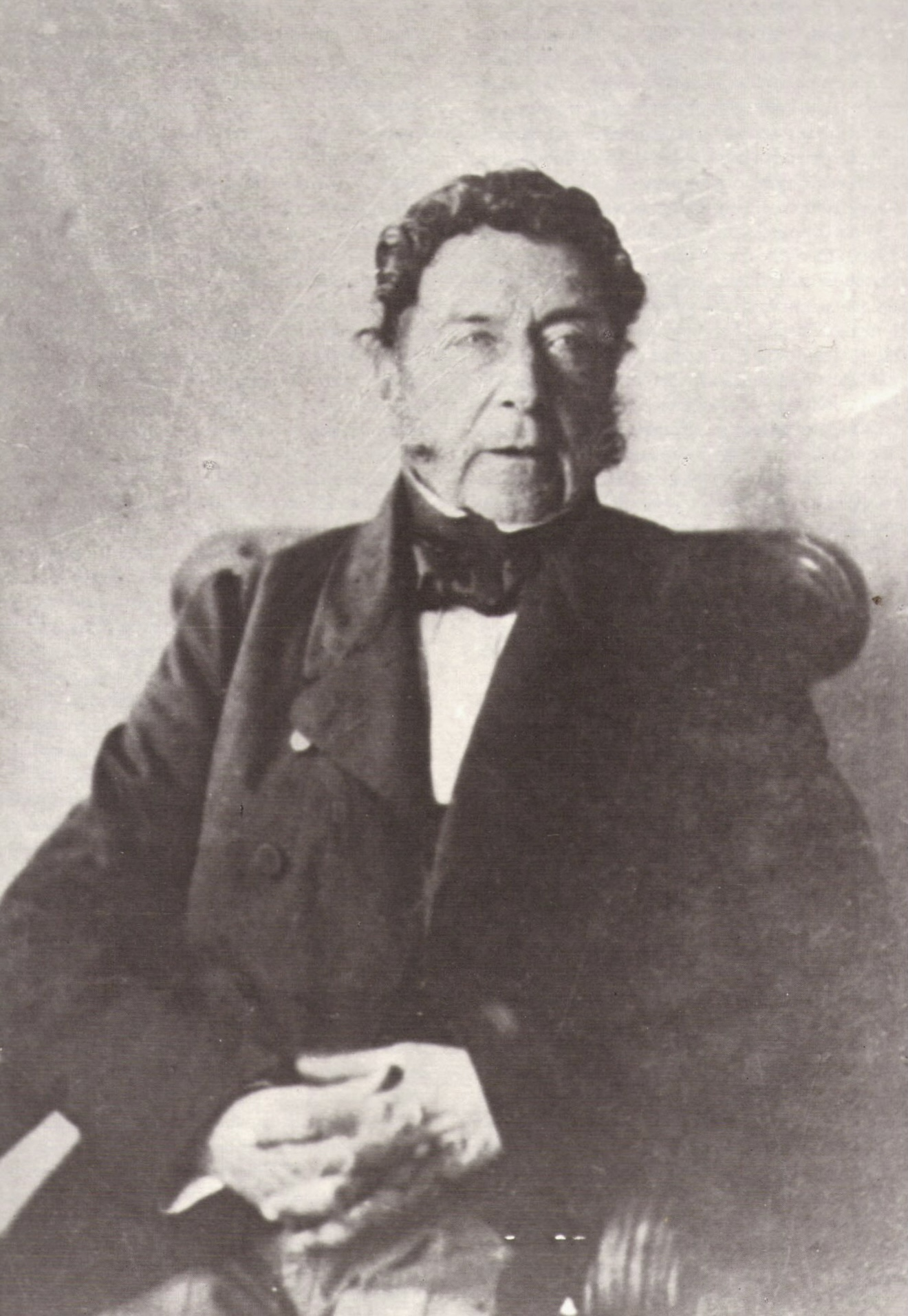
- Photograph of Carlo, c. 1865

President of the Council of Ministers of the Kingdom of the Two Sicilies
- In office 8 June 1859 – 16 March 1860
- Monarch: Francis II
- Preceded by: Ferdinand Troya
- Succeeded by: Antonio Statella di Cassaro

Personal details
- Born: 10 May 1784 Cava de' Tirreni
- Died: 9 October 1867 (aged 83) San Giorgio a Cremano
- Spouse: Agata Moncada (m. 1820; died 1862)
- Children: 4, including Gaetano
- Parents: Gaetano Filangieri, 5th Prince of Satriano (father); Carolina Frendel (mother)

Carlo Filangieri (10 May 1784 – 9 October 1867), Prince of Satriano, was a Neapolitan soldier and statesman. He was the son of Gaetano Filangieri, 5th Prince of Satriano, a celebrated philosopher and jurist, and father of Gaetano Filangieri, 7th Prince of Satriano, an art historian and collector.

== Early life ==
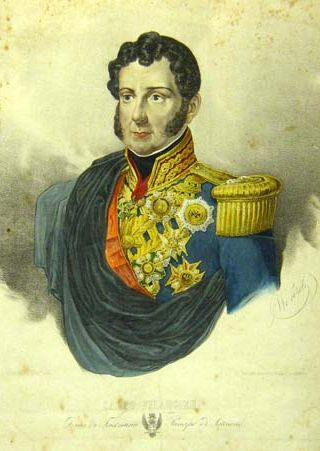
Carlo Filangieri

Filangieri was born on 10 May 1784 at Cava de' Tirreni, near Salerno. He was the eldest child of Gaetano Filangieri, 5th Prince of Satriano, a celebrated philosopher and jurist. His mother was the Hungarian noblewoman Carolina Frendel, who was the teacher of Princess Luisa Maria, second daughter of King Ferdinand IV.

At the age of fifteen Filangieri decided on a military career, and having obtained an introduction to Napoleon Bonaparte, then first consul, was admitted to the Military Academy at Paris.

== Career ==
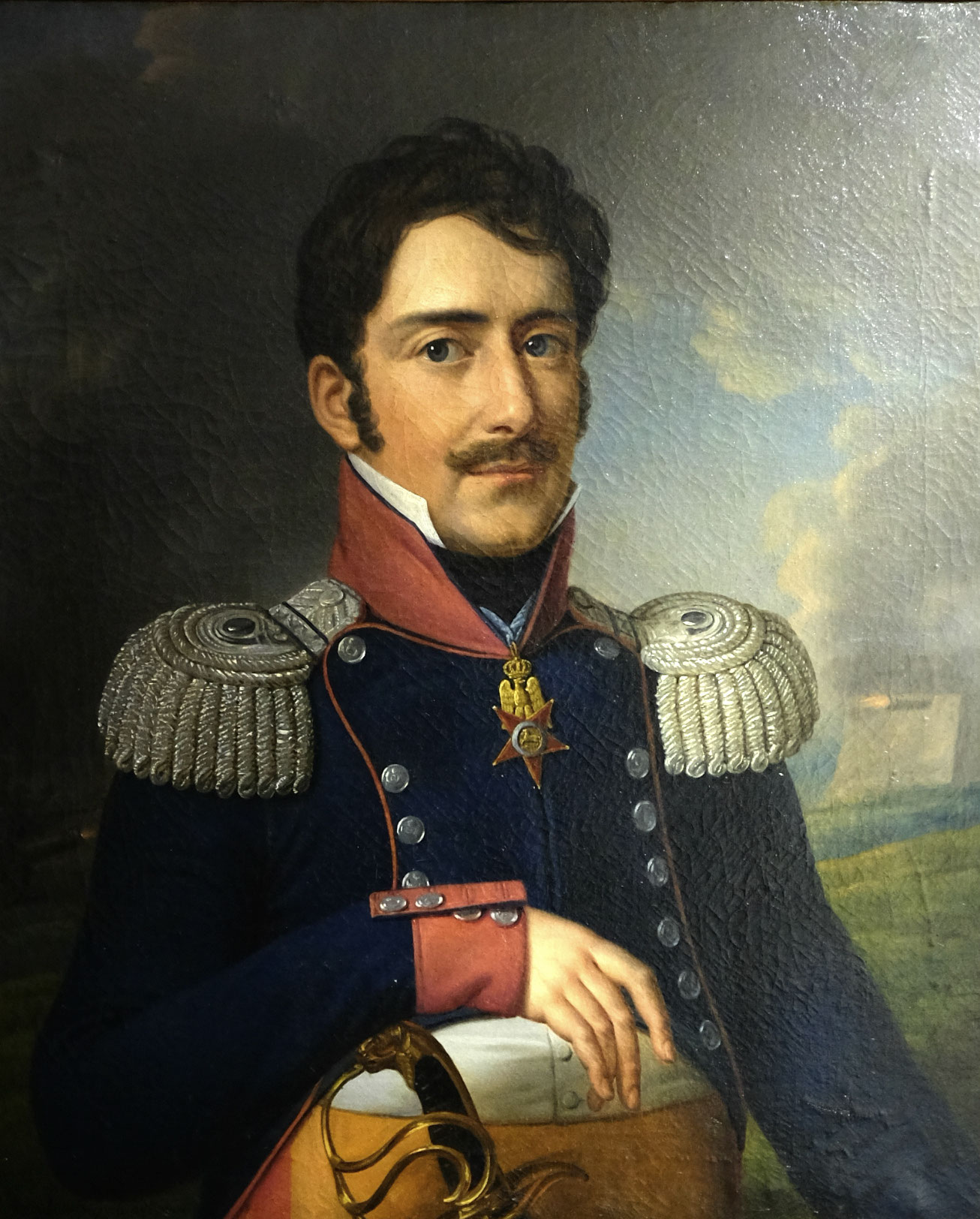
Portrait of Carlo Filangieri, 19th century

In 1803, he received a commission in an infantry regiment, and took part in the campaign of 1805 under General Davout, first in the Low Countries, and later at Ulm, Mariazell and Austerlitz, where he fought with distinction, was wounded several times and promoted.

He returned to Naples as captain on André Masséna's staff to fight the Bourbons and the Austrians in 1806, and subsequently went to Spain, where he followed Joseph Bonaparte in his retreat from Madrid. After having slain General François Franceschi-Losio in a duel he was sent back to Naples; there he served under Joachim Murat with the rank of general, and fought against the Anglo-Sicilian forces in Calabria and at Messina. On the fall of Napoleon, he took part in Murat's campaign against Eugène de Beauharnais, and later in that against Austria, and was severely wounded at the Battle of the Panaro in 1815.

=== Bourbon restoration ===
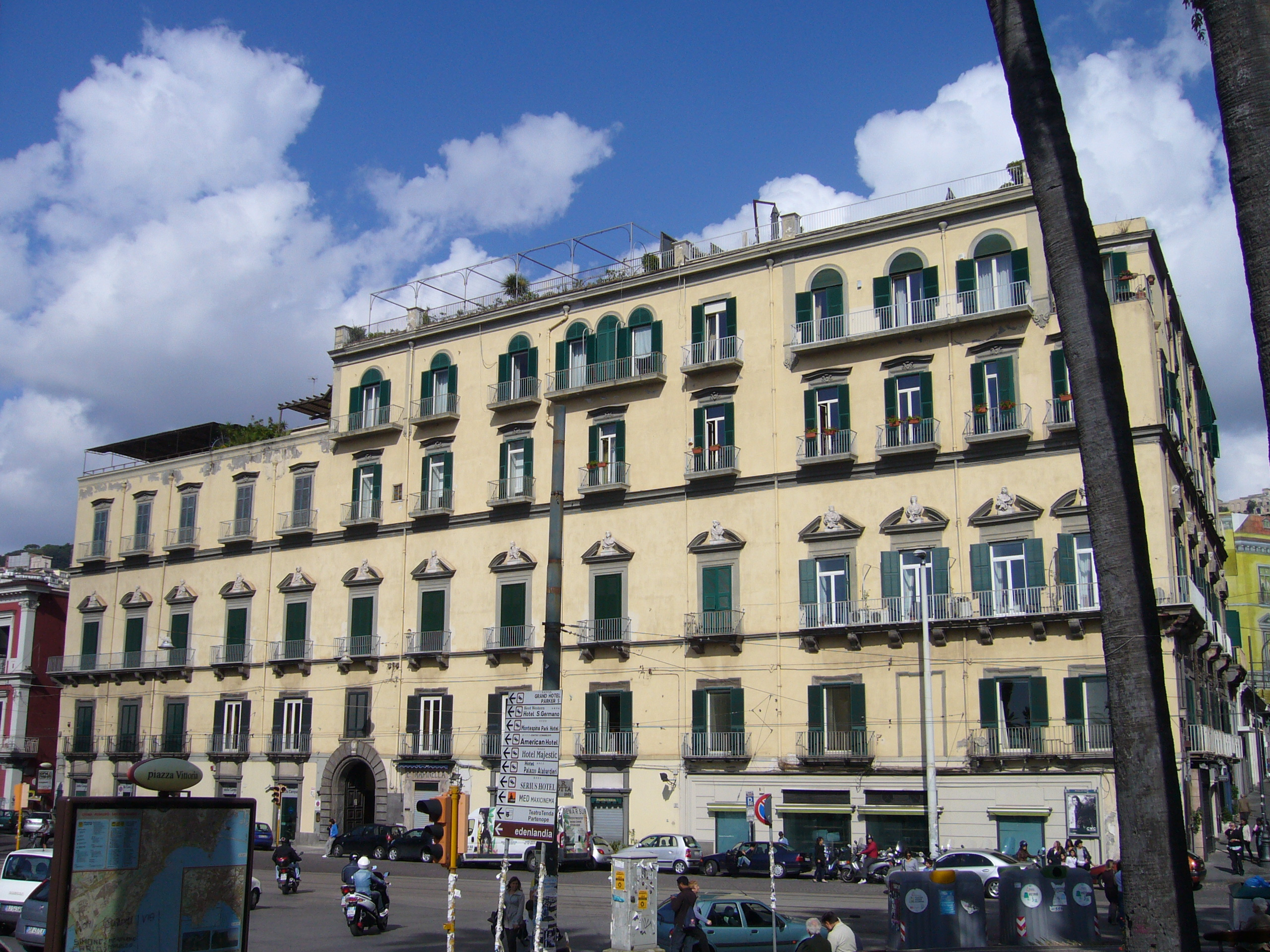
The current appearance of the Palazzo Ravaschieri in Naples, home of Filangieri since 1820.

On the restoration of the Bourbon King Ferdinand IV (I), Filangieri retained his rank and command, but found the army utterly disorganized and impregnated with Carbonarism. In the disturbances of 1820, he adhered to the Constitutionalist party, and fought under General Pepe against the Austrians. On the re-establishment of the autocracy, he was dismissed from the service, and retired to Calabria where he had inherited the princely title and estates of Satriano.

In 1831, he was recalled by Ferdinand II and entrusted with various military reforms. On the outbreak of the troubles of 1848, Filangieri advised the King to grant the constitution, which he did in February 1848, but when the Sicilians formally seceded from the Neapolitan kingdom Filangieri was given the command of an armed force with which to reduce the island to obedience. On September 3, he landed near Messina, and after very severe fighting captured the city. He then advanced southwards, besieged and took Catania, where his troops committed many atrocities, and by May 1849, he had conquered the whole of Sicily, though not without much bloodshed.

He remained in Sicily as Governor (the exact Italian title was Luogotenente generale dei reali domini al di là del Faro, meaning Lieutenant-general of the royal domains beyond the Lighthouse) until 1855, when he retired into private life, as he could not carry out the reforms he desired owing to the hostility of Giovanni Cassisi, the minister for Sicily. On the death of Ferdinand II on 22 May 1859, the new King Francis II appointed Filangieri Premier and Minister of War. He promoted good relations with France, then fighting alongside Piedmont against the Austrians in Lombardy, and strongly urged on the King the necessity of an alliance with Piedmont and a constitution as the only means whereby the dynasty might be saved. These proposals being rejected, Filangieri resigned office.

In May 1860, Francis at last promulgated the constitution, but it was too late, for Giuseppe Garibaldi was in Sicily and Naples was seething with rebellion. On the advice of Liborio Romano, the new prefect of police, Filangieri was ordered to leave Naples. He went to Marseilles with his wife and subsequently to Florence, where at the instance of General Alfonso Ferrero la Marmora he undertook to write an account of the Italian army. Although he adhered to the new government he refused to accept any dignity at its hands.

== Personal life ==
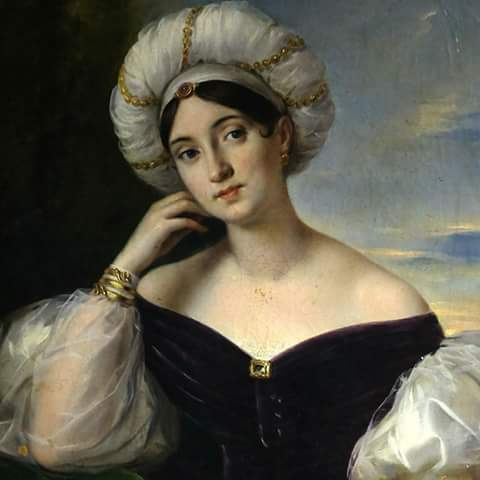
Portrait of his wife, Agata Moncada

On 6 April 1820 Filangieri was married to Maria Agata Moncada (1803–1862), the youngest daughter of Giovanni Luigi Moncada, 9th Prince of Paternò, and, his second wife, Princess Giovanna del Bosco Branciforte (a daughter of Vincenzo del Bosco, 6th Prince of Belvedere who was a lady-in-waiting of Queen Maria Carolina). Together, they were the parents of:

- Princess Carolina Filangieri (1821–1895), who married Giovanni Battista de Guevara, Duke of Bovino, in 1838.
- Princess Giovanna Filangieri (1822–1886), who married the Duke of Serra di Cardinale.
- Gaetano Filangieri, 7th Prince of Satriano (1824–1892), and 2nd Duke of Taormina; an art historian and collector.
- Princess Teresa Filangieri (1826–1903), who married Vincenzo Ravaschieri Fieschi, Duke of Roccapiemonte.

The Prince died at his villa of San Giorgio a Cremano near Naples on 9 October 1867.

=== Legacy ===
According to Luigi Villari in the Encyclopædia Britannica Eleventh Edition, Filangieri was a very distinguished soldier, and a man of great ability; although he changed sides several times, he became really attached to the Bourbon dynasty, which he hoped to save by freeing it from its reactionary tendencies and infusing a new spirit into it. His conduct in Sicily was severe and harsh, but he was not without feelings of humanity, and he was an honest man and a good administrator.

His biography was written by his daughter Teresa Filangieri Fieschi Ravaschieri, Il generale Carlo Filangieri (Milan, 1902), an interesting, although somewhat too laudatory volume based on the general's own unpublished memoirs; for the Sicilian expedition see V. Finocchiaro, La rivoluzione siciliana del 1848-49 e la spedizione del generale Filangieri (Catania, 1906, with bibliography), in which Filangieri is highly criticised.
