= Michele Ferrara =

Italian footballer

Personal information
- Date of birth: 13 May 1993 (age 33)
- Place of birth: Canosa di Puglia, Italy
- Height: 1.87 m (6 ft 2 in)
- Position: Centre back

Team information
- Current team: Francavilla
- Number: 5

Senior career*
Years	Team	Apps	(Gls)
2011–2012	Barletta	0	(0)
2012–2014	→ Francavilla (loan)	60	(4)
2014–2015	Brindisi	25	(3)
2015–2020	Monopoli	117	(2)
2020	→ Sicula Leonzio (loan)	8	(0)
2021–2022	Pergolettese	50	(1)
2022–2023	Catania	6	(0)
2023	Messina	27	(0)
2023–2025	Fidelis Andria	30	(1)
2025–	Francavilla	0	(0)
- * Club domestic league appearances and goals as of 9 February 2026

Michele Ferrara (born 13 May 1993) is an Italian footballer who plays as a centre back for Francavilla.

== Club career ==
After five seasons with Monopoli, Ferrara joined Serie C club Pergolettese on 15 September 2020.

On 9 August 2022, Ferrara joined Catania in Serie D.

On 11 January 2023, Ferrara returned to Serie C and signed with Messina.

On 23 December 2023, he left the club via mutual consent. On the same day, he joined Fidelis Andria.
