= Fischetti =

Origin
- Language: Italian
- Region of origin: Italy

Fischetti is an Italian surname. Notable people with the surname include:

- Danilo Fischetti (born 1998), Italian rugby union player
- Charles Fischetti (1901–1951), American mobster
- Fedele Fischetti (1732–1792), Italian painter
- John Fischetti (1916–1980), editorial cartoonist
- Matteo Fischetti (1830–1887), Italian pianist and composer
- Michael Fischetti (born 1936), American actor
- Odoardo Fischetti (1770–1827), Italian painter
- Rocco Fischetti (1903–1964), American mobster
- Ronald Fischetti (1936–2023), American lawyer
- Vincent Fischetti (born 1940), American microbiologist and immunologist
