= Palazzo Cellammare, Naples =

Palace in Naples, Italy

Coordinates: 40.8361°N 14.2422°E

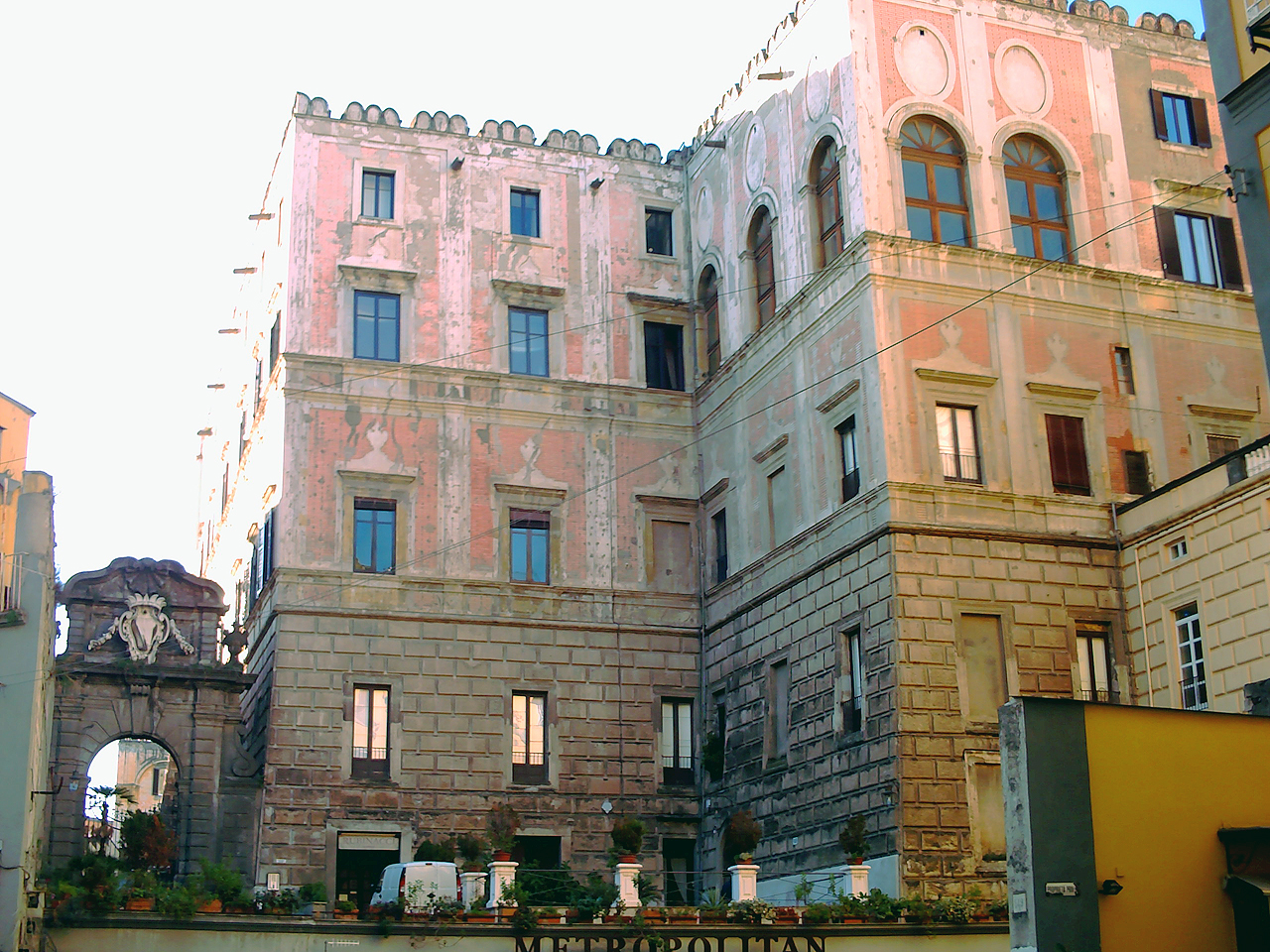
Main façade of Palazzo Cellammare.

The Palazzo Cellamare or Cellammare is a monumental palace located in via Chiaia 139 in the Quartiere San Ferdinando of Naples, Italy. The entrance is near the church of Santa Caterina a Chiaia.

== History ==
The palace was erected in the 16th century by Giovanni Francesco Carafa, Prince of Stigliano and a member of the House of Carafa. Giovanni Francesco's son Pier Luigi Carafa later commissioned Ferdinando Manlio to make the palace conform to the typical characteristics of its era.

During the Masaniello revolt in 1647, the palace was sacked by mobs and in 1689 it became the property of the state.

In the 18th century, it was acquired by the Prince of Cellamare, Antonio del Giudice, who hired Ferdinando Fuga to design the chapel between 1726 and 1727. It later became the residence of the Spanish Michele Imperiali Simeana, Prince of Montena and Francavilla (d. 1782), a friend of Casanova, and avid collector of statuary. The palace was briefly known as the Palazzo Francavilla. Further reconstructions were entrusted to the architect Francesco Antonio Picchiatti.

The palazzo contains ceiling frescoes by Giacomo del Po, Pietro Bardellino, Giacinto Diano, and Fedele Fischetti.

Little remains of the once sprawling gardens.
