= Santissima Annunziata Maggiore, Naples =

Church in Pendino, Naples, Italy

Basilica of Santissima Annunziata Maggiore Basilica della Santissima Annunziata Maggiore (in Italian)
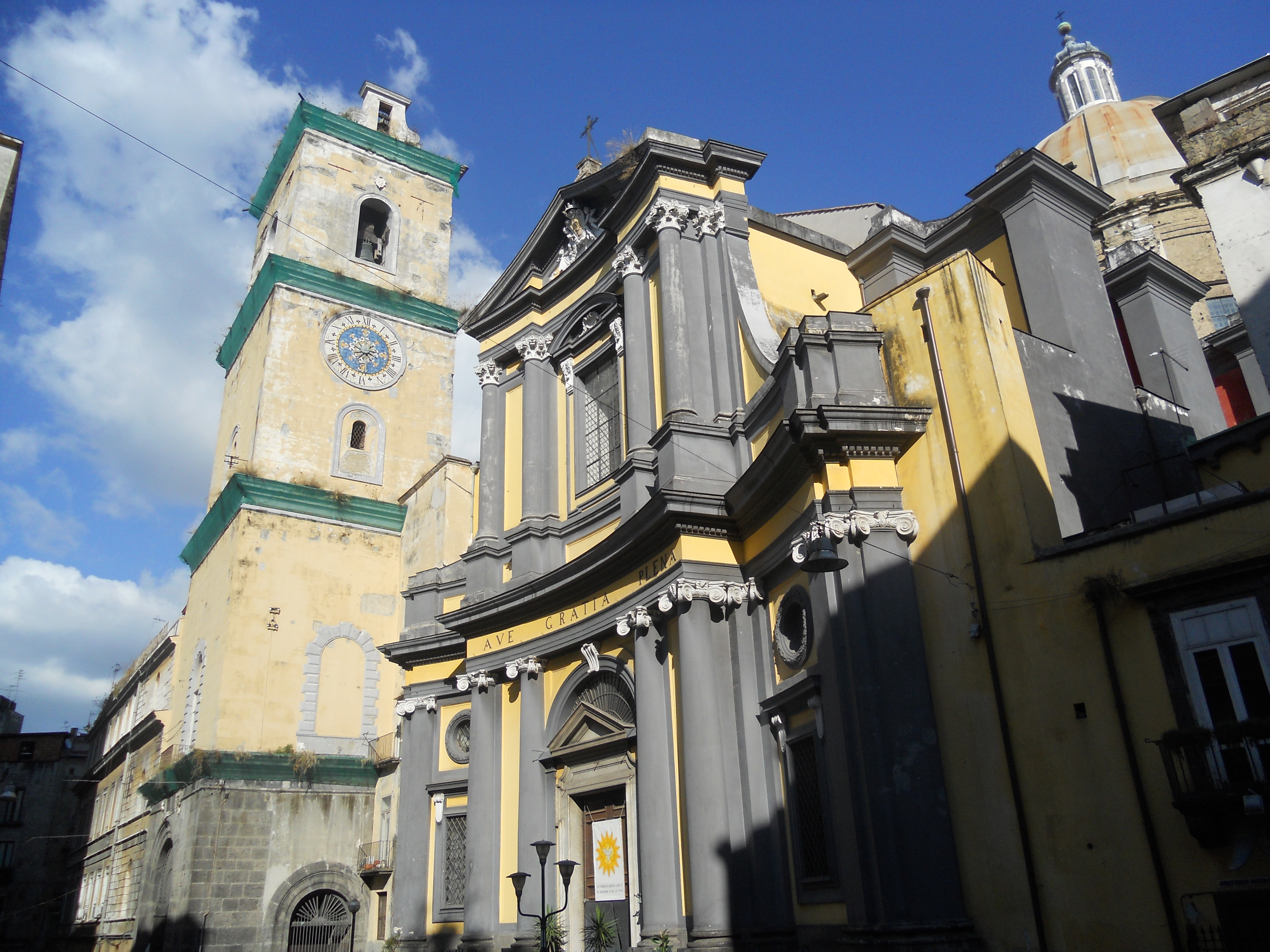
- Façade of Santissima Annunziata.

Religion
- Affiliation: Roman Catholic
- Diocese: Archdiocese of Naples
- Ecclesiastical or organizational status: Minor basilica

Location
- Location: Naples, Campania, Italy
- Interactive map of Basilica of Santissima Annunziata Maggiore; Basilica della Santissima Annunziata Maggiore (in Italian)
- Coordinates: 40.851190°N 14.265030°E

Architecture
- Type: Church
- Style: Neoclassical

The Santissima Annunziata Maggiore is a basilica church located in the quartieri Pendino near Forcella, in the historic center of Naples, Italy.

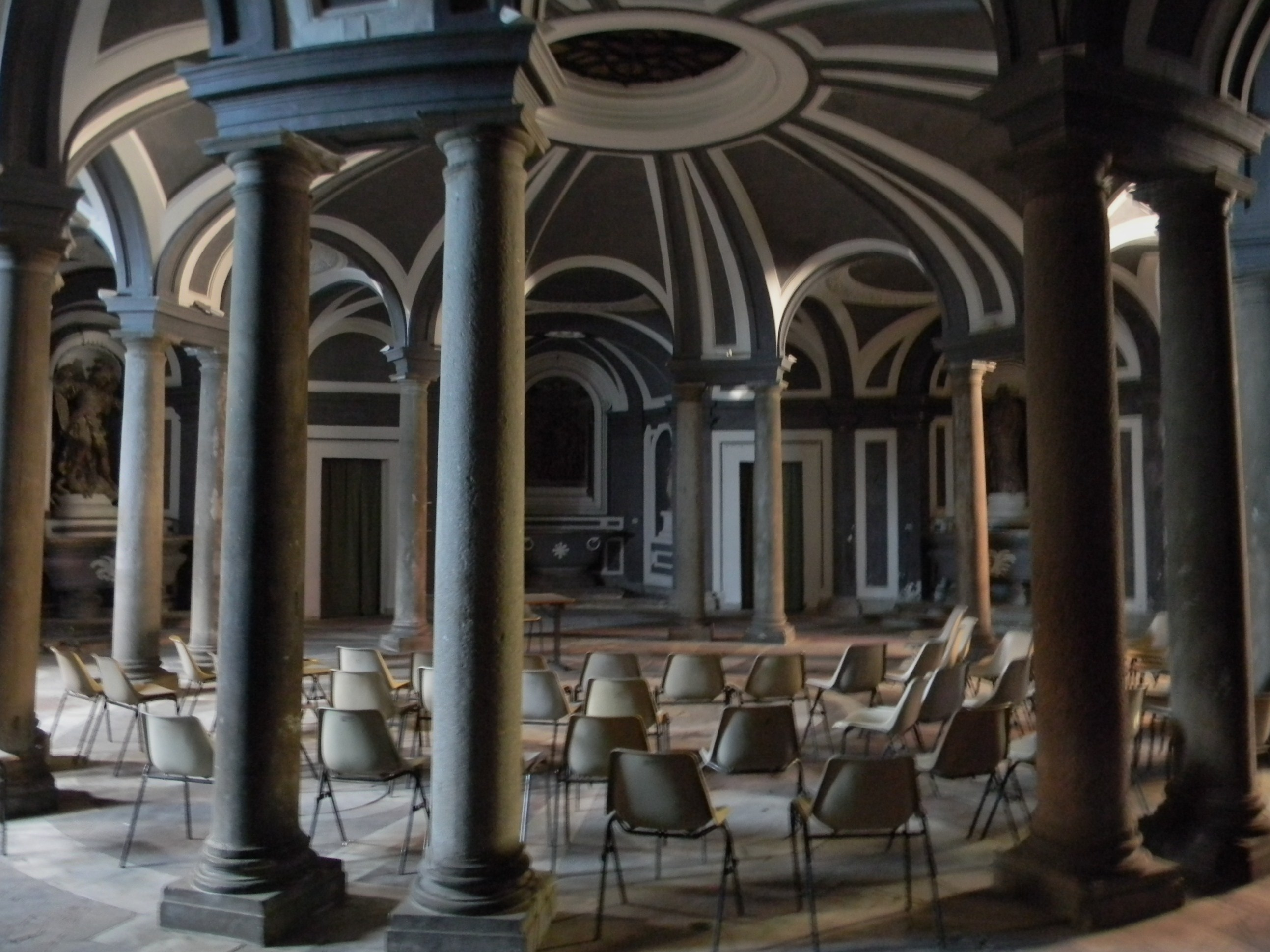
Inferior Church

== History ==
In the ancient Roman era, the city baths and gymnasium of Neapolis were located in this area. In 1318, Sancia of Majorca, the queen consort of Robert, King of Naples, ceded some land to the lay Congregation of the Santissima Annunziata to establish an institution for care of foundlings. The original church was located at the site of the current hospital, since fragments of 14th-century frescoes of the school of Roberto d'Odirisio were found there. The Angevin church however was razed by 1513, when a larger church was started. the architect Ferdinando Manlio, was likely involved. The bell tower was commissioned by the Baron Troiano di Somma.

Little survives of this church and its decoration; in 1757 a fire destroyed nearly all the church except for the sacristy, the chapel of the Treasury and the Carafa chapel. The next reconstruction followed a design by Luigi Vanvitelli, and was completed by his son Carlo. The church as we see it today was consecrated in 1774 and the concave facade added in 1782. Ferdinando Fuga helped rebuild the adjacent complex. The gray and white interior is a sober statement of "anti-Baroque", with a theme of coupled Corinthian columns under an unbroken entablature; paired ribs carry the columns upwards in skeletal semi-circular arches that articulate the coffered barrel vaulting. There are works by Giuseppe Sanmartino.

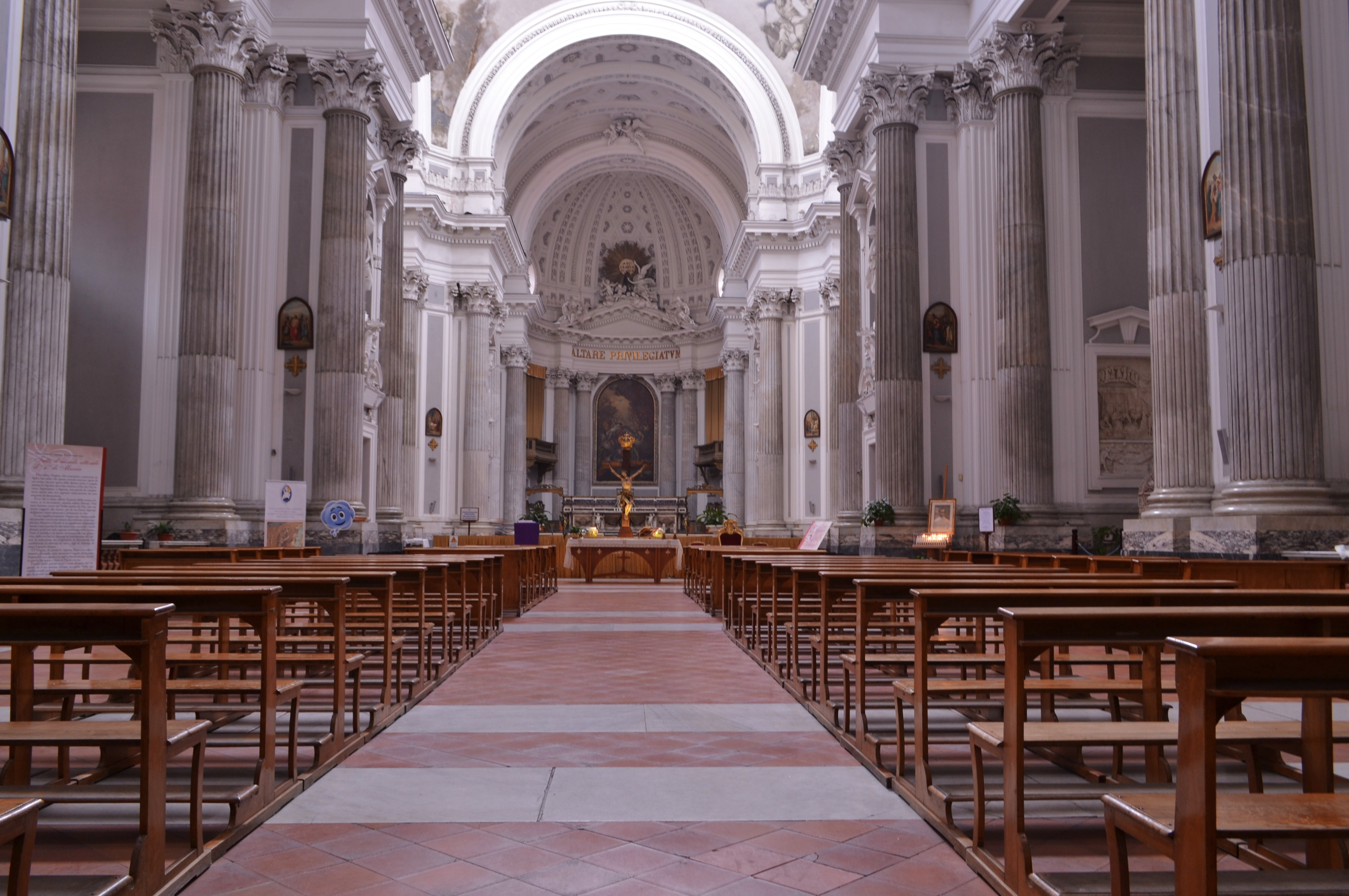
Nave

== The Orphanage and its wheel (ruota) ==
The church has always been associated, in one form or another, with an orphanage. The complex of buildings attached to the church are now part of a maternity and pediatric hospital. As an orphanage, it was equipped with a famous wheeled system on the wall, where abandoned infants were placed into a revolving basket container from the street, and the basket could then be turned such that the infant wound up within the church where nuns would then receive, baptize, and register the new addition to the orphanage. (The "basket room" has been restored and visitors may see how the operation was handled.) The existence of the wheel is documented by 1601. The system was abolished in the 1870s. The church functioned as an orphanage until the 1950s at which time state social services took over the task.

== Chapels ==
The first chapel on the left houses a Pietà attributed to Fabrizio Santafede. The second chapel on the left is dedicated to the Annunciation; the altarpiece was painted by Giacinto Diano. The third chapel on the left has an altarpiece depicting the Adoration by the Shepherds (1775) by the Genoese Francesco Narici. Of renown, and cult reverence, is the 14th century wooden sculpture of the Madonna de Repentiti. It is popularly known as “Mamma Chiatta”.

The first chapel on the right has an altarpiece of the Crucifixion (1774) by Fedele Fischetti. The chapel has the tomb of Francesco Mariconda (died 1626), noble and riding instructor of Phillip the fourth. Giuliano Finelli completed the sculpture. The second chapel on right has a canvas of the Virgin and Saints Januarius, Nicola, and others attributed to Giuseppe D'Amato.

== See also ==
- 18th-century Western domes
