= D'Amato =

D'Amato is an Italian surname. Notable people with the surname include:

- Al D'Amato (born 1937), former New York politician
- Alice, & Asia D'Amato (born 2003), Italian artistic gymnasts
- Anthony D'Amato (born 1987), American songwriter and singer
- Armand D'Amato (born 1944), American politician
- Barbara D'Amato (born 1938), American novelist
- Brian D'Amato (21st century), American author and sculptor
- C. Richard D'Amato (born 1942), American attorney
- Cus D'Amato (1908–1985), American boxing manager and trainer
- David D'Amato (1961/1962–2017), Usenet celebrity
- Federico Umberto D'Amato (1919–1996), Italian intelligence agent
- Giovanni D'Amato, 16th-century Italian Roman Catholic bishop
- Giovanni Antonio D'Amato the younger (circa 1535–1598), Italian painter
- Giuseppe D'Amato (born 1965), Italian historian of Russia
- Helen D'Amato, Maltese politician and educator
- Joe D'Amato (1936–1999), Italian director
- John D'Amato (died 1992), Italian-American mobster
- Keira D'Amato (born 1984), American distance runner
- Lisa D'Amato (born 1981), American fashion model
- Mike D'Amato (1941–2023), American college and professional football player
- Paul D'Amato (1908–1984), American club owner
- Paul D'Amato (actor) (1949–2024), American actor
- Paul R. D'Amato (born 1947), American lawyer and politician
- Peter D'Amato (21st century), American businessperson
- Rosa D'Amato (born 1969), Italian politician
- Vito D'Amato (1944–2025), Italian former footballer

== Characters ==
- Carli D'Amato, a character from the British sitcom The Inbetweeners portrayed by Emily Head
- Leo D'Amato, a character in the television series Veronica Mars
- Phil D'Amato, a NYPD forensic detective
- Tony D'Amato, a character from the movie Any Given Sunday
- Lt. D'Amato, a character in episode That Which Survives from Star Trek: The Original Series
- Gavin D'Amato, a character from the movie War of the Roses portrayed by Danny Devito

== See also ==
- Amato (disambiguation)
- Damato
