= Sigurd Schmidt =

Russian historian (1922–2013)

- Сигурд Шмидт
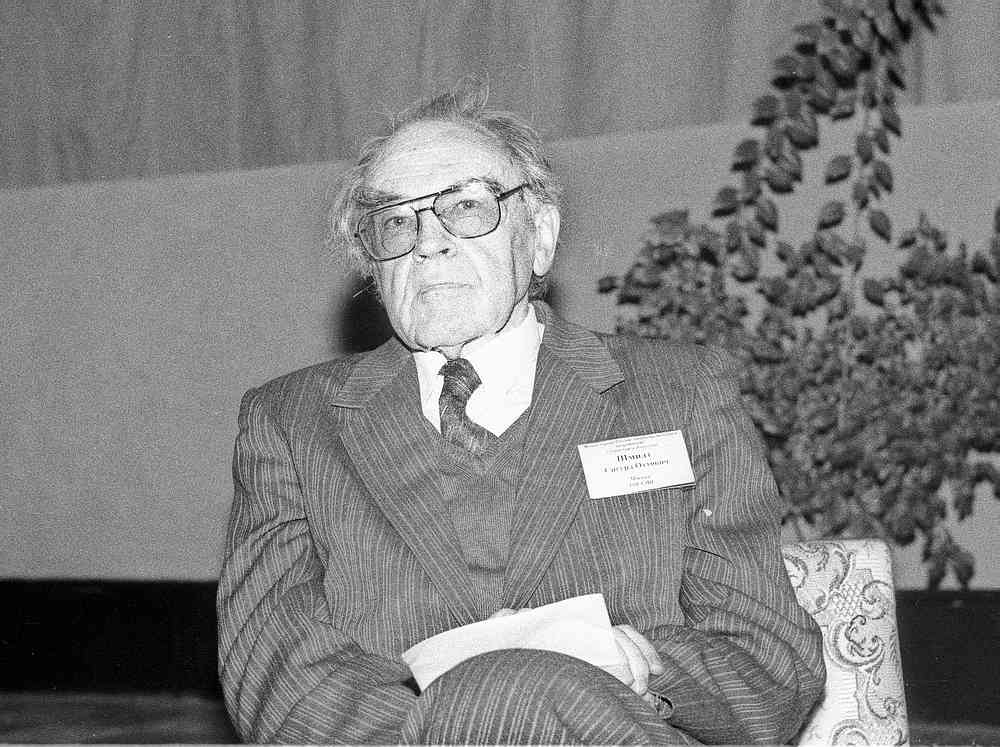
- Born: Sigurd Ottovich Golosovker; 15 May 1922; Moscow, Russia
- Died: 22 May 2013 (aged 91); Moscow, Russia
- Education: Moscow University
- Scientific career
- Fields: History
- Workplaces: Russian State University for the Humanities

Sigurd Ottovich Schmidt (Russian: Сигурд Оттович Шмидт; né Golosovker; 15 May 1922 – 22 May 2013) was a Russian historian, ethnographer and teacher.

== Biography ==
Sigurd Ottovich Schmidt was born on May 15, 1922, in Moscow. His father was the mathematician Otto Schmidt, and his mother was the literary critic Margarita Golosovker. Schmidt graduated from the Faculty of History at the Moscow University in 1944.

In 1949, he began teaching at the Moscow Historical Archives Institute (now part of the Russian State University for the Humanities). He received his Doctor of Historical Sciences in 1965 and became an Honorary Doctor RSUH in 1970, attaining the title of 'Professor'. At the same time, starting in 1956, he worked in the Institute of History of Sciences of the USSR (now Institute of Russian History at RAS).

From 1968 to 2006 he was Chairman of the Archaeographic Commission at the Academy of Sciences (Commission of the Institute of Slavic Studies RAS for archaeography, archival and related disciplines), after which he became its Honorary President (head of the Commission RAS is Corresponding Member S.M. Kashtanov).

He was a member of the Presidential Council for especially valuable objects of Russian cultural heritage. He was also a member of many scientific and editorial boards. Schmidt chaired the All-Russia Society of Local Studies, the jury for the Nikolai Antsiferov Award, and served as the executive editor of "Archaeography Yearbook," Moscow's encyclopedia, as well as a number of other periodicals.

He was the Deputy Chairman of the Editorial Board of Library "History of Moscow, from ancient times to the present day", and the head of the Teaching and Research Center of the Historical Country Studies and Moscow Studies.

Since 1949, he also supervised the student scientific society "Source of National History".

Schmidt edited more than 500 scientific works on cultural history, historiography, archeology and archives, and many others. His works on the medieval history of Russia's 16th and 17th centuries are particularly important.

== Awards ==
Since 1989, Schmidt has been an Honored Scientist of Russia. In 1992, he was recognized as an Academician of Russian Academy of Education, and in 1997, as a Foreign Member of the "Polish Academy of Sciences" and a Counselor of Academy of Sciences.

Schmidt is the winner of the RF "Government Prize in Education" (1999), and was awarded the insignia "For services to Moscow" (2007).

Dmitry Likhachev described him as "a scholar-historian of a broad plan, and as an organizer of science, and as a mentor of young scientists, and as a public figure, dedicating a lot of time on the protection of historical and cultural monuments, manuscripts documentary heritage." He was called "the best in our day expert on sources on the history of Russia's 16th century."

In 2009, he received the award "Triumph" in the category of "Humanities".

== Schmidt's School ==
Beginning in 1949, he supervised the student scientific circle of Source of national history that became, as Dmitry Likhachev said, "a school not only of science but also of civil behavior for many of its members." Initially composed of S.O. Schmidt's immediate disciples, the club became one of the strongest points of attraction for students and other teachers, accumulating and enriching all of its members of collective research experience. For this reason, this circle is called the "Schmidt's School" - a high top-level school for "istochnikovedcheskie" research. Many works have been edited in this society. Italian historian Giuseppe D'Amato was one of his students.

== Published works ==
- The Formation of Russian samoderzhavstva. A Study of socio-political history of the time of Ivan the Terrible. - Moscow: Mysl, 1973. - 358 pp.
- Russia's state in the middle of the 16th century: the imperial archives, and Ivan the Terrible's time letopis. - M.: Nauka, 1984. - 277pp.
- Archeology. Archival. Pamyatnikovedenie. Collected papers. - M.: Izdatel'stvo RGGU, 1997. - 362 pp.
- The Path of the historian: Selected Works on historiography. - M.: Izdatel'stvo RGGU, 1997. - 612 pp.
- Russia's Ivan the Terrible. - M.: "Nauka", 1999. - 556 pp.
- The Public consciousness of Russia's noble birth: 17th century – the first third of the 19th century. - M.: "Nauka", 2002. - 363 pp.
- "The phenomenon Fomenko" in the context of the study of modern social historical consciousness. - M.: Nauka, 2005. - 71 pp.
- Monuments of writing in a culture of knowledge of the history of Russia. Vol. 1: pre-Petrine Russia. Kn. 1.—Moscow: Languages of Slavic Culture, 2007. - 480 pp.
- Monuments of writing in a culture of knowledge of the history of Russia. Vol.1: pre-Petrine Russia. Kn. 2. - Moscow: Languages of Slavic Culture, 2008. - 406 p.
- Monuments of writing in a culture of knowledge of the history of Russia. Т. 2. Kn. 1. From Karamzin to "arbatstva" Okudzhava. - Moscow: Languages of Slavic Culture, 2009. - 576 pp
