= Girgenti =

Girgenti is an Italian surname, deriving from the Sicilian name for the town of Agrigento in Sicily.

Girgenti may refer to:

- Paolo Girgenti (c. 1769 – after 1800), Italian painter of the late 18th and early 19th-centuries, active in Naples
- John Girgenti (born 1947), American state legislator
- Agrigento, the Sicilian city
- Province of Agrigento, in the Sicilian language
- A zone in Siġġiewi in the island of Malta that also contains Girgenti Palace
- The Girgenti meteorite of 1853; see Meteorite falls
- Girgenti, village in the Italian comune of Pescorocchiano, Rieti Province, Central Italy.
- Girgenti House - a small estate in East Ayrshire, Scotland.
