= Palazzo Doria =

Palazzo Doria may refer to a number of historical palaces and villas which belonged or still belong to the Doria family (Ligurian: Döia), originally De Auria (Latin: de filiis Auriae; 'the sons of Auria'), an old and extremely wealthy Genoese family who played a major role in the history of the Republic of Genoa and in Italy, from the 12th century to the 16th century.

- Villa del Principe, the Palace of Andrea Doria in Fassolo, Genoa
- Palazzo Doria, Palazzo dei Rolli in the historical center of Genoa, included in the World Heritage Site Genoa: Le Strade Nuove and the system of the Palazzi dei Rolli
- Palazzo Doria Spinola, Palazzo dei Rolli in the historical center of Genoa, included in the World Heritage Site Genoa: Le Strade Nuove and the system of the Palazzi dei Rolli
- Palazzo Doria d'Angri, palace in the historical center of Naples
- Palazzo Doria Pamphili, palace in the historical center of Rome

== See also ==
- Doria (family)
