= San Nicola alla Carità =

Church of St. Nicholas the Charitable
- Chiesa di San Nicola alla Carità
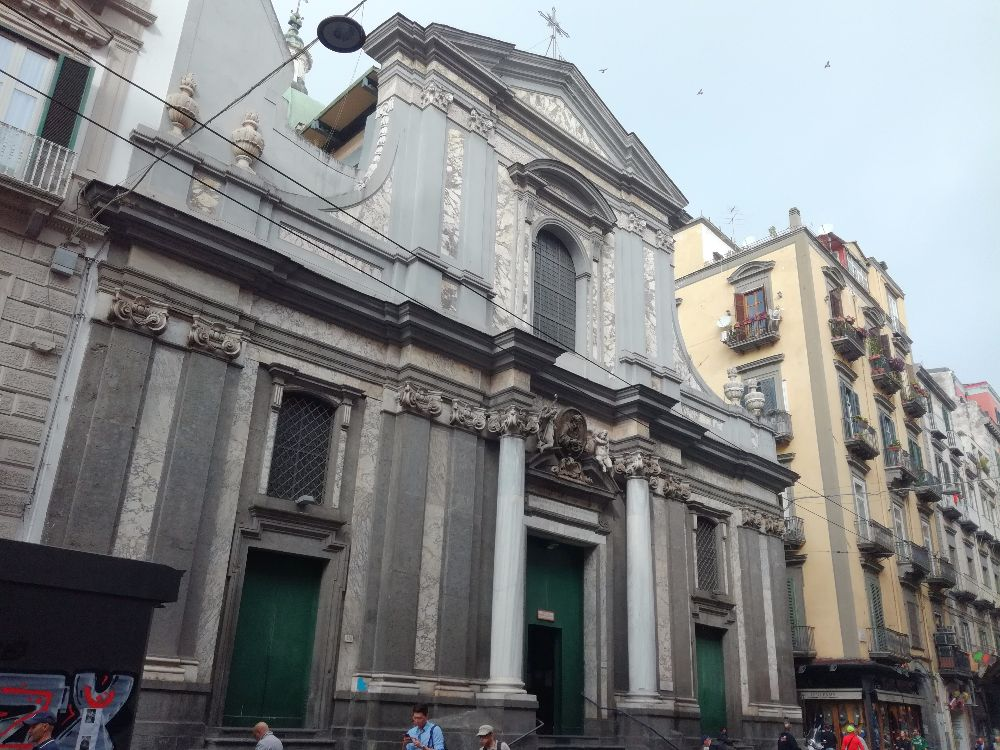
- The façade of church.
- Church of St. Nicholas the Charitable
- 40.845426°N 14.248962°E
- Location: Via Toledo, Naples, Campania
- Country: Italy
- Denomination: Roman Catholic

History
- Status: Active

Architecture
- Architectural type: Church
- Style: Baroque architecture
- Groundbreaking: 1647
- Completed: 1682

Administration
- Diocese: Roman Catholic Archdiocese of Naples

The Church of St. Nicholas the Charitable (Italian: Chiesa di San Nicola alla Carità) is a church located on via Toledo, almost midway between Piazza Carità and Piazza Dante in Naples, Italy.

== History ==
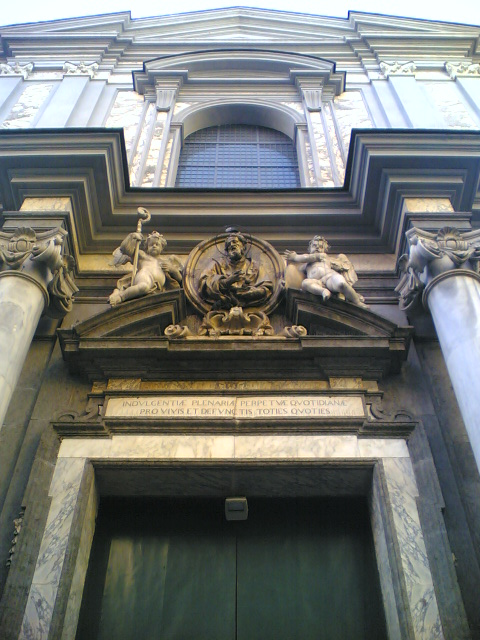
Detail of the front door

The church was founded in 1647, thanks to a donation of about 6000 ducats to the Pious Workers by a nobleman of the time, as a reward for their welfare work. The building of the church, designed by Onofrio Antonio Gisolfi, was interrupted by the plague that struck the city in 1656, and was completed in 1682 by Cosimo Fanzago, who worked under the patronage of Cardinal Diego Innico Caracciolo di Martina. The church underwent various reconstructions. In eighteenth century the façade was rebuilt by Salvatore Gandolfo, following designs of Francesco Solimena. During the ten years of French occupation, the church was deconsecrated and it housed a Corps of Engineers. In 1843 the structure was restored by Guglielmo Turi.

The Church houses the bodies of the Neapolitan painter, Bernardo Cavallino, and father Antonio Torres, who, with the order of Piarists, distinguished themselves in service to the ill from the plague of 1656. All members of the Order of the Pious Workers died from contact with the infected, except four monks, including Father Antonio. Each year during the Christmas period, visitors can see the Presepes, belonging to the church, in a room under the building.

== The interior ==
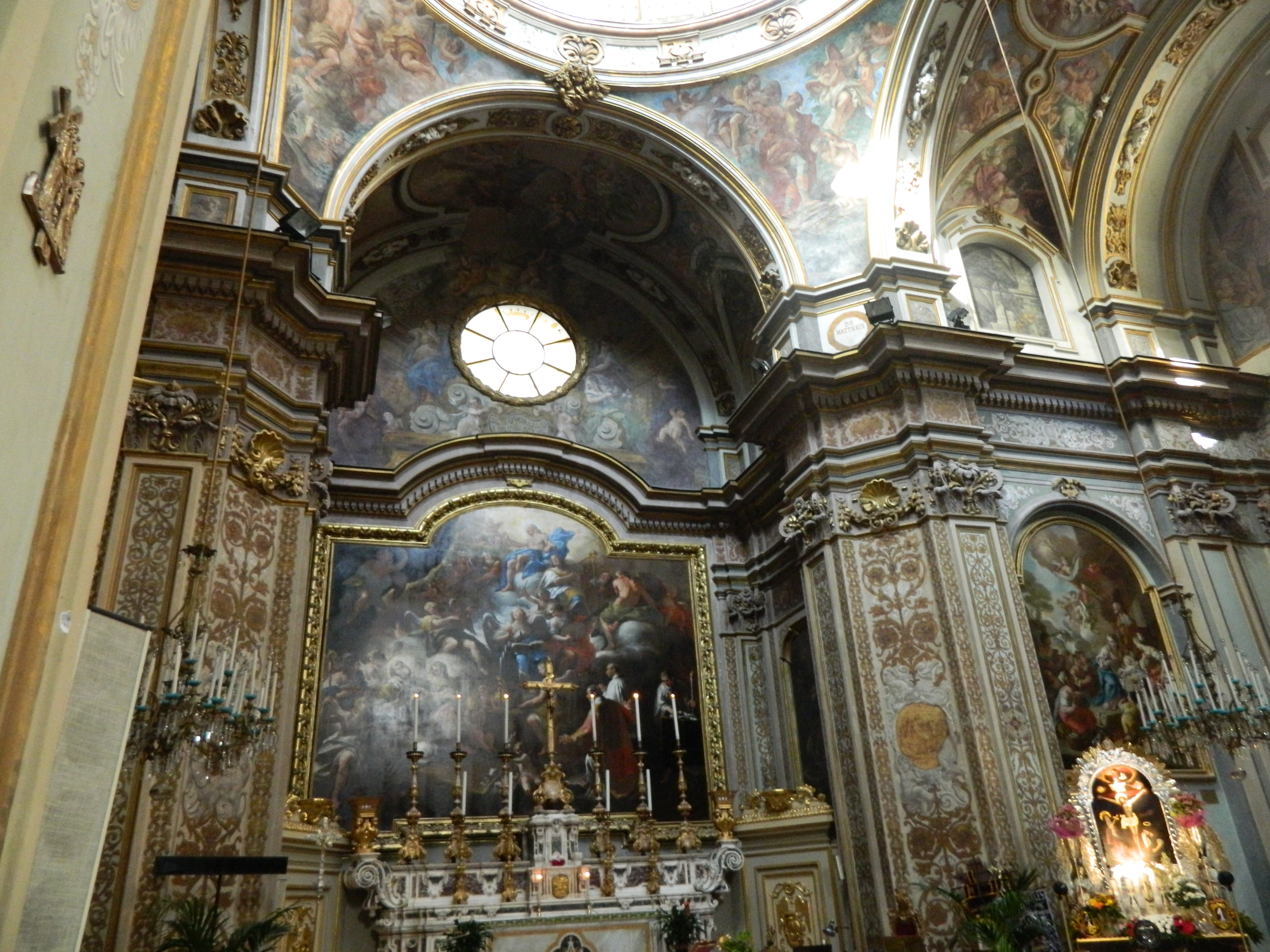
Apse behind altar with Death of St Nicholas by Paolo De Matteis

The layout is a Latin cross, with three aisles, and side chapels. The nave has a series of frescoes (1696) by Francesco Solimena, depicting in the lunettes the life of St. Nicholas, Virtue and the Apostles. He also painted a Sermon of St. Paul and St. John the Baptist (1697). Paolo De Matteis painted a San Nicola expels Demons from a Tree (1712), which adorns the entrance of the church, and Death of St. Nicholas (1707), which sits behind the altar. The high altar made from polychrome marbles, arranged in 1743 by Antonio Troccola and designed by Mario Gioffredo. The dome was frescoed by Francesco De Mura.

=== Chapels ===
- Left

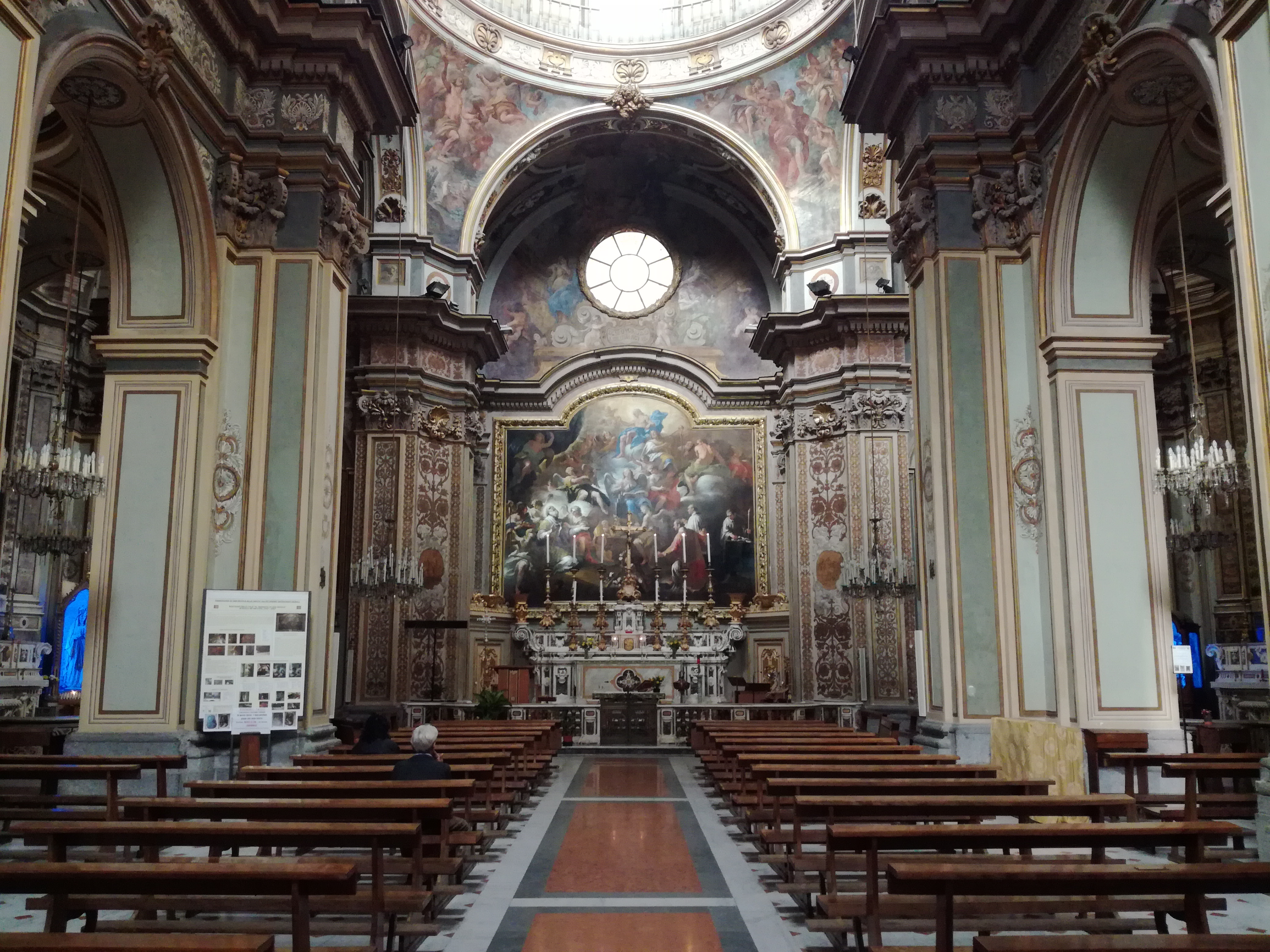
View of nave

Chapel I

Contains three works of Paolo de Maio: an altarpiece depicting the Marriage of the Virgin and Saint Joseph, St Charles Borromeo, and Sant'Andrea d'Avellino (St Andrew of Avellino).

Chapel II

It is the oldest (1646) in the church, and dedicated to St. Nicholas of Bari. It contains a 17th-century altarpiece, St Nicholas of Bari, Bishop of Myra, a cycle of frescoes by Nicola Maria Rossi depicting the Eternal Father, three paintings on the Miracles of St. Nicholas by Francesco De Mura and Rossi; and frescoes on dome (1729) by De Mura.

Chapel III

Dedicated to the guardian angel, depicted in the altarpiece of Giovan Battista Lama (a pupil of Giordano), the chapel hosts two paintings by Pietro Bardellino: St. Francis of Paola and Apollonia.

- Right

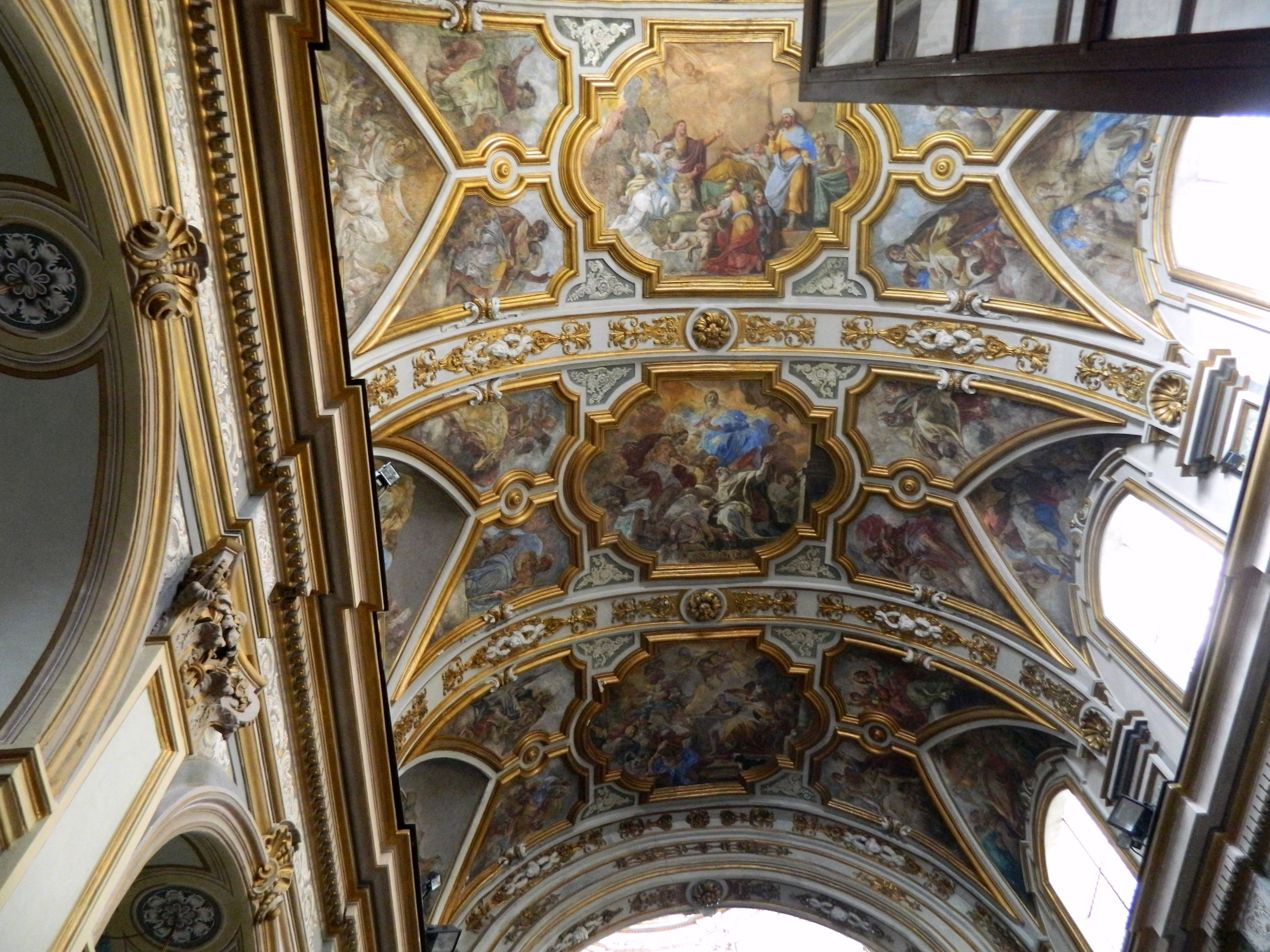
Vault

Chapel I

On the altar is Trinity by Nicola Maria Rossi, while side walls have two paintings by Giacinto Diano (pupil of De Mura) depicting the Departure and Arrival of Tobias. This chapel also houses the seventeenth-century bust of Carlo Carafa and his wax death mask.

Chapel II

The chapel is called "the crucifix" because it houses a wooden cross, by Nicola Fumo, from the end of the seventeenth century. There are two paintings on the side walls by Leonardo Pozzolano (pupil of Solimena), depicting Santa Maria Maddalena and San Giovanni Evangelista.

Chapel III

The chapel, originally dedicated to St. Michael. The altarpiece, by De Mura, was rededicated to Saint Liborio in 1773. The two side canvasses, also by De Mura depict St. Michael Archangel and Archangel Raphael.

- Transept

A cycle of frescoes by D'Alessio Elia decorates the transept. The canvas on the left side of the altar, by Solimena, depicts the Virgin between St. Peter and Paul (1684). The Visitation of the Blessed Virgin to Saint Elizabeth on the door of the sacristy is by De Mura, as well as the Adoration of Shepherds placed on the right side of the transept.
