= Montecalvario =

- Quarter of Naples
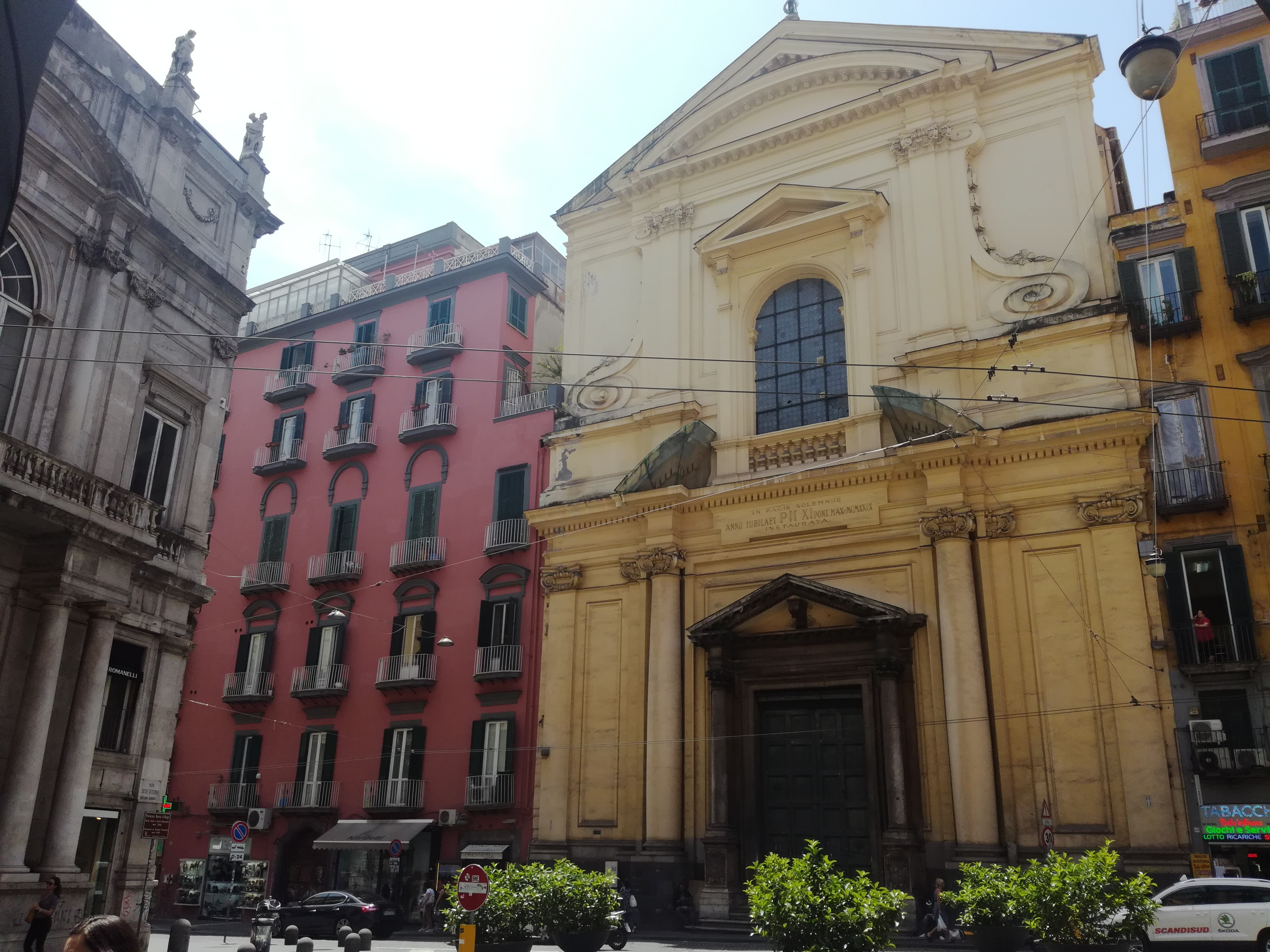

- Location of Montecalvario within Naples
- Coordinates: 40.844444°N 14.244722°E
- Country: Italy
- Region: Campania
- City: Naples
- Municipality: 2nd

Area
  - Total: 0.29 sq mi (0.75 km^{2})

Population
  - Total: 23,050
- Time zone: UTC+1 (CET)
  - Summer (DST): UTC+2 (CEST)
- Postal code: 80134

Montecalvario (Italian: Mount of Calvary) is a quarter of Naples, southern Italy. The area centers roughly on the square called Piazza Carità and the metal monument to Salvo D'Acquisto at the northern end of the Quartieri Spagnoli (Spanish Neighborhoods) of the city; the area stretches along the main downtown street, via Toledo (or via Roma), to include a number of historic buildings built under the Spanish Viceregal in the 16th century, including the building that housed the "Nunzio apostolico", the ambassador of the Holy See to Naples, and the home of Giambattista della Porta. The area is part of the Historic Centre of Naples, a UNESCO World Heritage Site.

== Area ==
The area was affected in the 1980s by the organized crime with frequent gunfights between local Camorra gangs. Organized crime is still widespread in Naples and Montecalvario, with a new generation of young people taking over from the Camorra leaders who were sent to jail. Local institutions and associations such as the Associazione Quartieri Spagnoli (Spanish Neighborhood Association) founded in 1986 deals with various initiatives to help people stay away from a life of crime.

The expansion plan of Don Pedro de Toledo expanded the perimeter of the walls by creating a new artery, from the monastery of Santo Spirito to the convent of Monteoliveto, continuing to the Porta Reale, connecting pre-existing developments and villages, as well as the ancient city. The enlargement was designed by Giambattista Benincasa and Ferdinando Maglione. Most of the territory of the Spanish Quarters is located within the Montecalvario limits (about 70% of the population).

In 2003, a recovery program called "Urban" was launched, which consists of paving pavements and the lighting of some roads in the neighborhood such as Via Toledo. In 2012, the redevelopment of the area was accompanied by the opening of the Toledo metro station, with the subsequent inauguration, in 2013, of the through annex with entrance to Largo Montecalvario.

== See also ==
- Palazzo Buono
- Central Funicular
- Santa Maria della Mercede a Montecalvario
