= Nicola Maria Rossi =

Italian painter

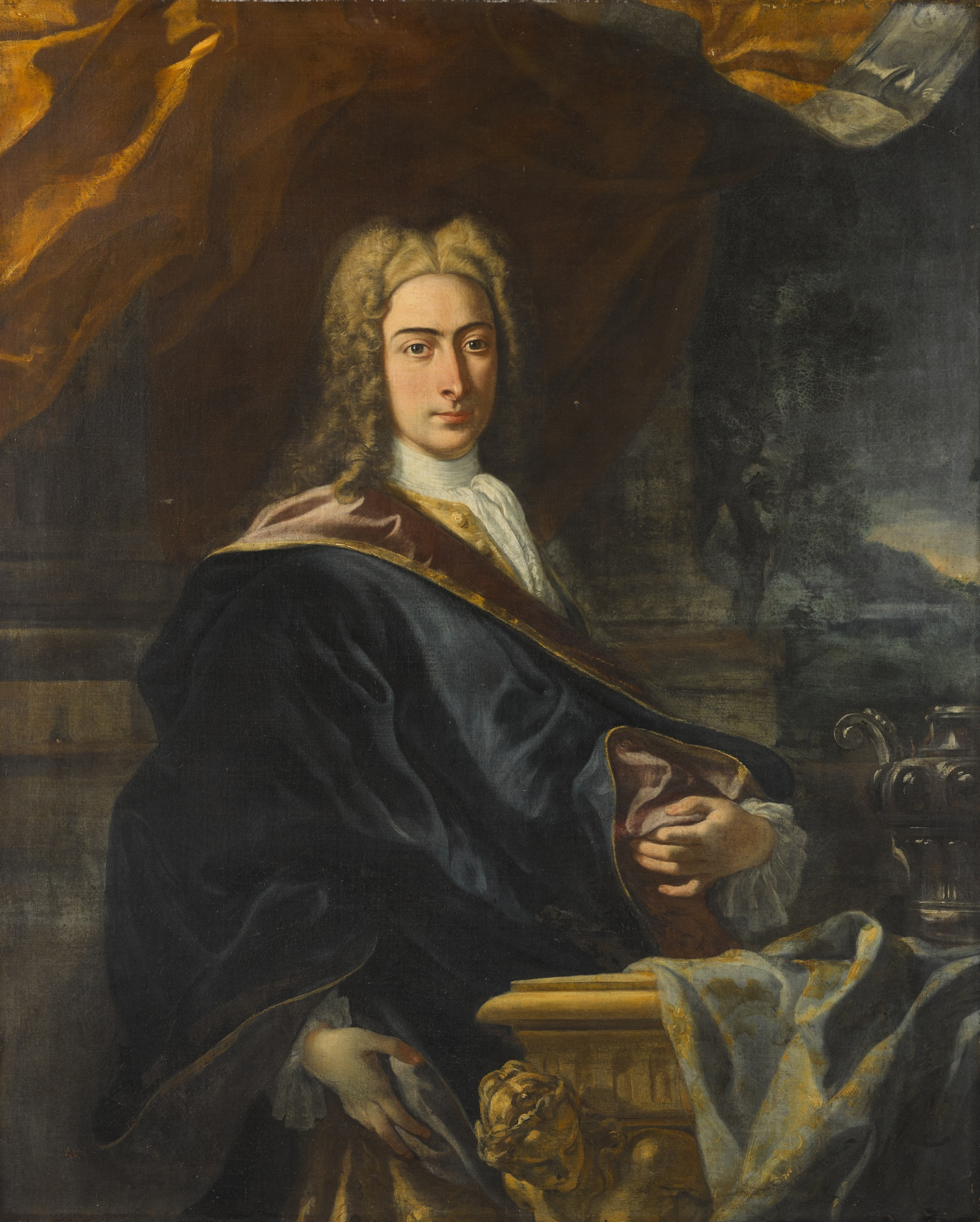
- Portrait of Robert Jones, c. 1730, Museo di Capodimonte, Naples
- Born: 1690; Naples, Kingdom of Naples
- Died: 23 April 1758 (aged 67–68); Naples, Kingdom of Naples
- Education: Francesco Solimena
- Known for: Painting
- Movement: Baroque

Nicola Maria Rossi, also known as Nicolò Maria (Naples, 1690 – Naples, 23 April 1758) was an Italian painter of the late-Baroque.

== Biography ==
=== Early life and education ===
Nicola Maria Rossi was born in Naples in 1690. At the age of 15 years, he had begun studying a classic education, but after a fireworks injury damaged one eye, he became a pupil of Francesco Solimena in 1706. Nicola later likely tutored Corrado Giaquinto while in that studio. At the beginning of Rossi’s apprenticeship Solimena, in keeping with the Arcadian movement in poetry and literature, was moving away from Baroque drama towards a more classical style, indebted to Carlo Maratta. Rossi imitated his master’s style so successfully ‘that he would often exchange the originals for copies made by him’ (de' Dominici).

=== Mature career ===
The frescoes of 1716 for San Sossio at Frattamaggiore mark his artistic début. In 1723 Rossi painted, under Solimena’s direction, the fresco of the Eternal Father and the canvas of the Trinity (Naples, San Nicola alla Carità). The fresco of the Assumption of the Virgin (signed and dated 1725; San Paolo Maggiore, Naples) owes much to Solimena’s treatment of the same subject, for example his Assumption of 1697 (Marcianise, Annunziata) or the altarpiece in Capua Cathedral.

In 1726 Rossi was summoned to Vienna, where he frescoed the gallery of the Prince of Rofrano, a counselor for the Holy Roman Emperor Charles VI and painted portraits of the Court Chancellor, the Count Philipp Ludwig Wenzel von Sinzendorf, and of several prominent members of the court. He also painted two vast allegorical compositions for the country residence of Aloys Thomas Raimund, Count Harrach and Viceroy of Naples and Sicily (1728–33); these, signed and dated at Naples in 1730, represent The Human Soul Overcoming Passions through Philosophy and Virtue and Pallas Delivering Youth from Vice (both Vienna, Kunsthistorisches Museum).

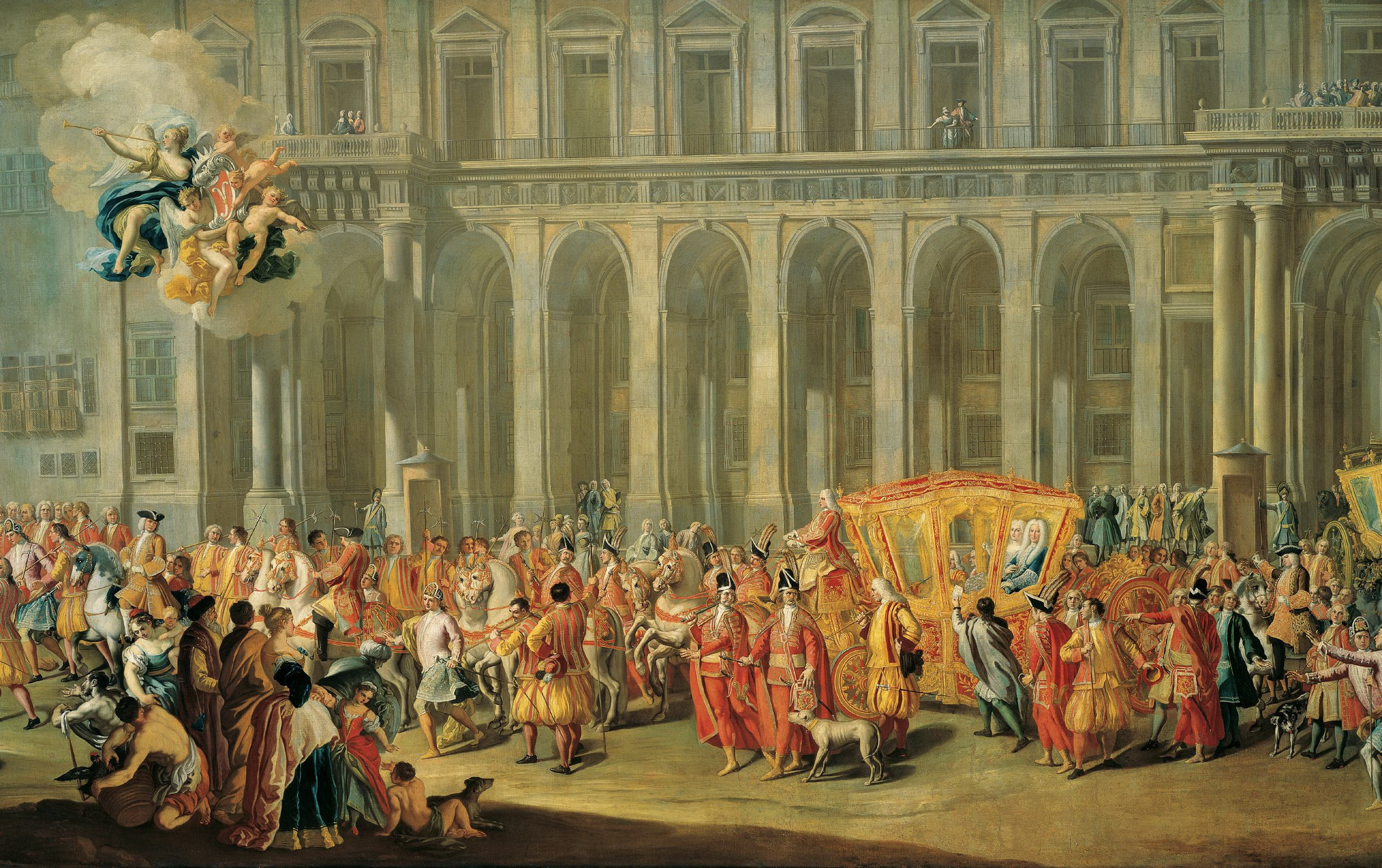
Viceroy Harrach departs from the Royal Palace of Naples, c. 1730, Schloss Rohrau, Rohrau, Austria

For the same patron he executed three large canvases showing the latter’s public functions: the Departure of the Viceroy, the Feast of Piedigrotta and the Procession of the Four Altars. These works record their subjects with great accuracy (in the Procession the musicians of the Royal Chapel can be recognized, as can the painter himself), and their lively Rococo quality anticipates the work of Filippo Falciatore.

A lucid but at the same time good-humoured sharpness of observation distinguishes the portrait of the Duke of Bovino’s Children (Naples, Museo Civico Filangieri).The canvases commissioned by Niccolò Gaetani for Piedimonte Matese, as well as the canvas of St. Vicenzo Ferreri Preaching (Piedimonte Matese, San Domenico) can be dated to c. 1732.

Rossi’s religious works from this period include St. Nicholas of Tolentino and the Virgin (Venafro, Sant'Agostino), the Virgin with St. Francis and St. Lawrence (Naples, Santa Maria Donnalbina) and the Fall of the Rebel Angels (Naples, San Giuseppe dei Vecchi). A renewed interest in Solimena’s work and in the iridescent colour of that of Giaquinto characterize the canvases of the Finding of the True Cross and the Raising of the True Cross, paid for between 1736 and 1737 (both Cava dei Tirreni, Museo dell'Abbazia della SS. Trinità).

=== Later work ===
Between 1738 and 1739 Rossi intensified his search for bolder decorative effects, encouraged by a similar quest by Solimena during those years, which resulted in a Baroque revival. The frescoes carried out for the wedding of Charles III, King of Naples, and Maria Amalia of Saxony, intended for the queen’s bedroom (and known only from de Dominici’s description) were also produced in 1738. The bozzetti of Minerva and Various Olympian Deities (Naples, priv. col.), the Wedding of Jove and Juno and Aurora in a Chariot (both Musée des beaux-arts de Chambéry) may be related to this work. The refined Arcadian tone of these paintings also distinguishes a series of overdoors of mythological subjects (Naples, Mazzeo priv. col.) and the canvas of the Freeing of Andromeda (Beauvais, Musée départemental de l'Oise).

Between 1739 and 1740, at Naples, he executed some more academic works, such as Our Lady of Sorrows by the Tomb and six ovals with figures of saints (all San Lorenzo Maggiore, Naples), and the Virgin Investing the Servites (signed; Santa Maria dei Sette Dolori). Among his last known works are the Annunciation (1745; Naples Cathedral, Cappella Caracciolo) and the frescoes in the vestibule of the Royal Chapel of the Treasure of St. Januarius in Naples Cathedral. These demonstrate how far removed Rossi was from the new interest in the Baroque that was sweeping through Naples in the 1740s. Between 1751 and 1753 he was paid for frescoes in the church of Santa Chiara, Naples. The canvas of Belshazzar’s Feast (Naples, Villa Floridiana) bears on the reverse side an 18th-century inscription ‘On 23 April 1758 D. Nicola Rossi died’.

== Bibliography ==
- Dominici, Bernardo de' (1743). Vite dei pittori, scultori ed architetti napoletani. Vol. III. Naples: Ricciardi. pp. 685–90.
- Bean, Jacob; Griswold, William (1990). 18th Century Italian Drawings in the Metropolitan Museum of Art. New York: Metropolitan Museum of Art. ISBN 978-0870995859.
