= Via Toledo =

Ancient street in Naples, Italy

Coordinates: 40°50′44″N 14°14′57″E

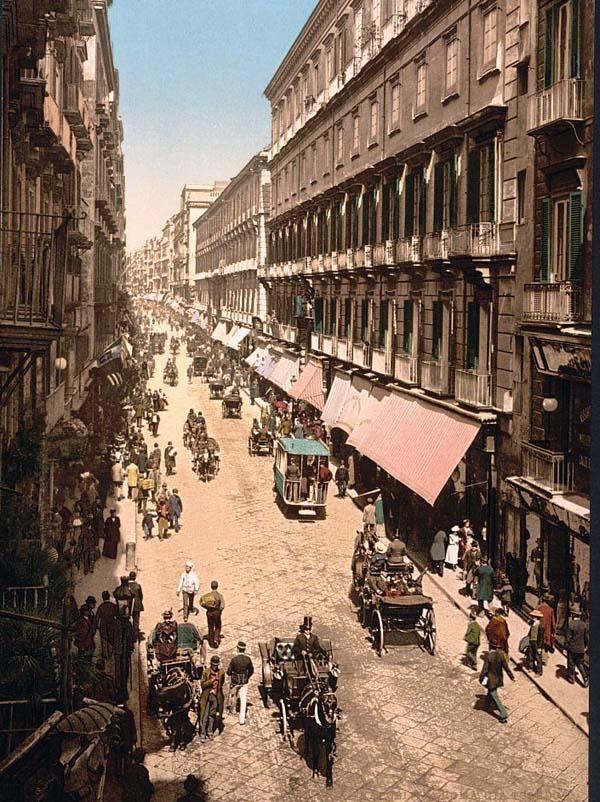
via Toledo at the end of the 19th century

Via Toledo is an ancient street and one of the most important shopping thoroughfares in the city of Naples, Italy. The street is almost 1.2 kilometres (0.75 mi) long and starts at Piazza Dante and ends in Piazza Trieste e Trento, near Piazza del Plebiscito.

== History ==
The street was created by Spanish viceroy Pedro de Toledo in 1536, who entrusted Ferdinando Manlio, an Italian architect.

Over the centuries, the reputation of the street was enhanced through being a stop on the Grand Tour.

On 15 May 1848, the street was the scene of the repression of Neapolitan liberals who defended the recently established constitution.

Between the 1930s and the 1950s, the street was modified by the construction of taller buildings, especially near the area of Piazza Carità.

From 18 October 1870 to 1980, the street was called "Via Roma", to celebrate Italian unification.

In 2012, "Toledo" metro station opened, and the street became closed to traffic from Via Armando Diaz to Piazza Trieste e Trento.

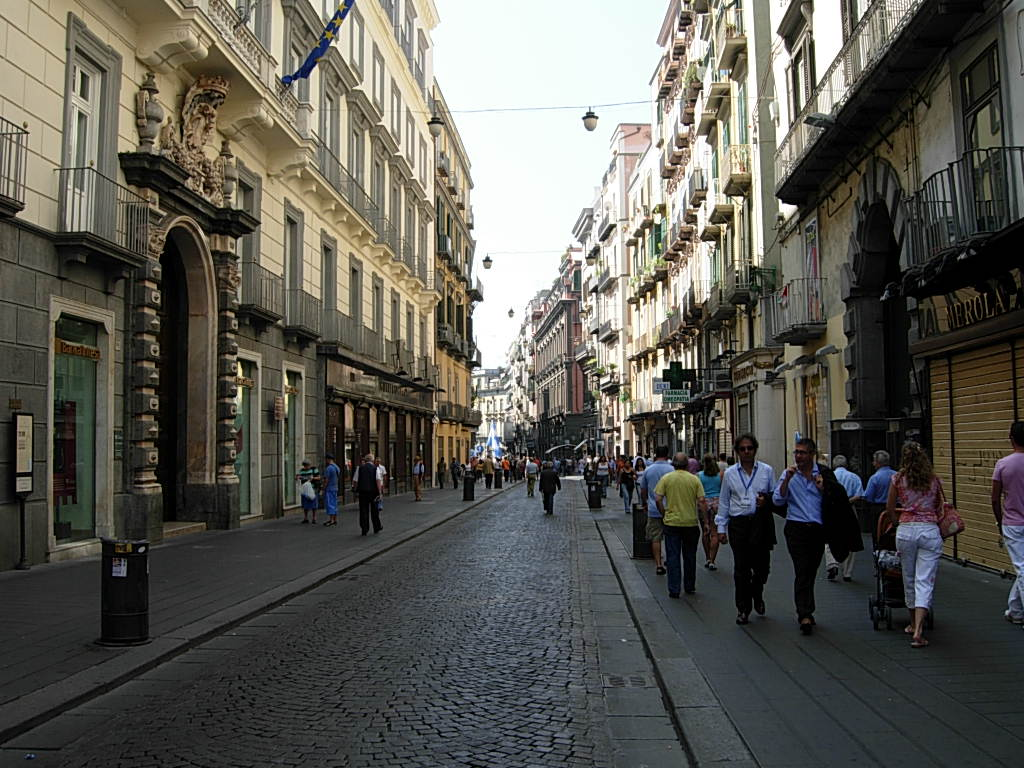
via Toledo today

The street was mentioned by Stendhal, who wrote:

EN: "8th March, 1817. - I'm leaving [Naples]. I will no more forget the Via Toledo than [I will ] the view that one has of all Naples's neighbourhoods: it is, in my opinion, beyond compare: the most beautiful city in the universe."

== Monuments ==
The street is one of the most important tourist destinations of the city, with a large number of religious and monumental buildings, connecting two important city squares.

Heading from Piazza Trieste e Trento toward Piazza Dante, the main sites of historical and architectural interest on the street are:

- Galleria Umberto I
- Palazzo Barbaja
- Palazzo Berio
- Palazzo del Banco di Napoli
- Palazzo Zevallos
- Palazzo della Banca Nazionale del Lavoro
- Chiesa di Santa Maria delle Grazie a Toledo
- Palazzo Buono
- Palazzo INA
- Chiesa di San Nicola alla Carità
- Palazzo del Conservatorio dello Spirito Santo
- Palazzo Doria d'Angri
- Basilica dello Spirito Santo
- Palazzo de Rosa

== Sources ==
- Marrone, Romualdo (2004). Le Strade di Napoli (in Italian). Vol. 2. Rome: Newton & Compton. ISBN 88-541-0068-4.
- "A Road By Any Other Name: Naples Via Toledo". Insiders Abroad (Napoli Unplugged). 2015. Archived from the original on 2 June 2017.
