= Amato (disambiguation) =

Amato is a comune and town in the province of Catanzaro in the Calabria region of Italy.

Amato may also refer to:

- Amato (surname)
- Amato (racehorse), winner of the 1838 Derby Stakes
- Amato Lusitano (1511-1568), Portuguese Jewish physician
- Amato Opera, an American opera company

== See also ==
- Amati
- Amato's
- D'Amato
