= Fedele Fischetti =

Italian painter (1732–1792)

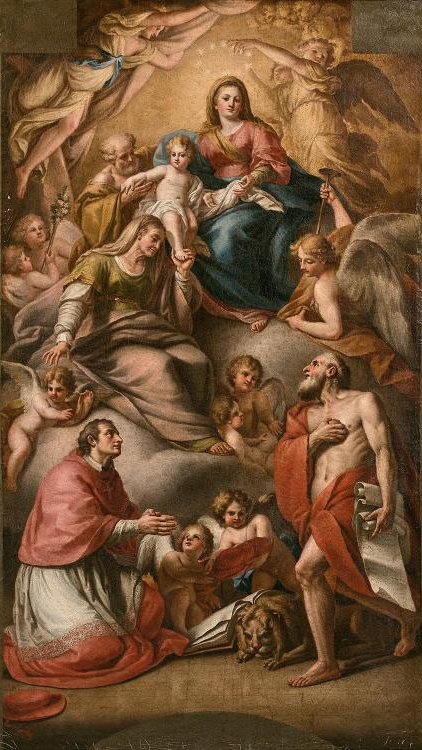
The Virgin in Majesty, with the Infant Jesus

Fedele Gioffredo Fischetti (30 March 1732, Naples – 25 January 1792, Naples) was an Italian painter of the Neoclassical period. Most of his works are frescoes of an allegorical or mythological nature. His work shows the influence of Pompeo Batoni.

== Life and work ==
=== Early life and career ===
Born into a family of Neapolitan painters, he first worked in the bottega of Gennaro Borrello, whose daughter he married in 1753. He may have visited Rome during the 1750s, which would explain the moderated classical rethinking of the contemporary Rococo style that is evident in his early work. Once he had established his reputation, he was called on to create decorative works for churches and palaces. His first such works date from 1760. His first major work was a canvas depicting the Holy Family, for the church of Santa Teresa in Benevento (1763).

He executed works on sacred subjects for many Neapolitan churches during the period 1759–66. Among these are the canvases for the church of the Spirito Santo, including the Presentation of the Virgin; the Birth of the Virgin for Santa Maria in Portico; two canvases for Santa Maria la Nuova; and the frescoes for the nave vault of S Caterina da Siena.

=== Mature career ===
In the mature and late periods of his career, Fischetti was a brilliant decorator, as seen in his fresco cycles for the villas and palaces of the Neapolitan nobility and for the Bourbon court of Ferdinand IV. The artist attempted to reconcile the characteristics of late Baroque decoration with the new demands of formal clarity imposed by the court, using a lightened colour scheme. From the end of the 1770s and throughout the following decade, he produced allegorical, mythological and historical frescoes, including those for the Palazzo Fondi; Alexander of Aragon’s Entry into Naples for the salone of the Palazzo Maddaloni; and the Dream of Alexander the Great and other scenes for the gallery of the Palazzo Casacalenda (now the Palazzo Reale di Capodimonte).

Between 1778 and 1781, he worked in the royal palace of Caserta, where he produced the frescoes of the Four Seasons and the related Golden Age. In 1784, Fischetti frescoed the Palazzo Doria d'Angri, where he adopted the courtly and classical decorative styles of such northern European painters as Heinrich Füger and Angelica Kauffman, who were then active in Rome. A famous fresco, in the vault of the Palazzo Doria d'Angri, depicts the triumph of Admiral Lamba Doria against the Venetians in 1298. Stylistically very close to these frescoes is the canvas representing Caesar and Cleopatra (1780s; Bellucci Sessa priv. col.).

In this period, Fischetti also began working, alongside Giuseppe Bonito, for the Accademia del Disegno in Naples, and he collaborated with such architects as Ferdinando Fuga and Mario Gaetano Gioffredo, but especially with Luigi Vanvitelli and Carlo Vanvitelli (1739–1821).

Meanwhile, he continued to paint religious works for Neapolitan churches, such as the Crucifixion (1780) for the Annunziata. He also executed frescoes in the church of the Annunziata in Capua. Whereas in his work for ecclesiastical patrons, Fischetti’s style is sometimes sterile, suffocated by late Mannerist influence, in his secular subjects, he developed an aptitude for sophisticated naturalistic scenes, skilfully executed with a sense of colour derived from French painting.

Around 1789, Fischetti was engaged at the Palazzo Cellammare in Naples on a grandiose fresco of Apollo and the Muses. From 1790 to 1791, he decorated the gallery in the casino at San Leucio with frescoes of the Triumph of Bacchus and Ariadne and other scenes from the life of Bacchus, which were painted as a virtual hymn to life and to carefree sensuality.

=== Later career ===
In this late phase of his career, the artist was repetitive in his rationalistic approach and had lost his earlier freshness. Fischetti produced a number of drawings during his career; these are remarkable for the excellent quality of execution and the fineness of line (e.g. Allegory of the Golden Age, c. 1778–9; New York, Scholz col.). He also executed cartoons, such as those for a series of tapestries representing the story of Cupid and Psyche (c. 1781) for the royal palace of Caserta; and those (after 1781) for the tapestries of the salone of the casino at Carditello (Naples, National Museum of San Martino and Museo di Capodimonte).

== Selected works ==
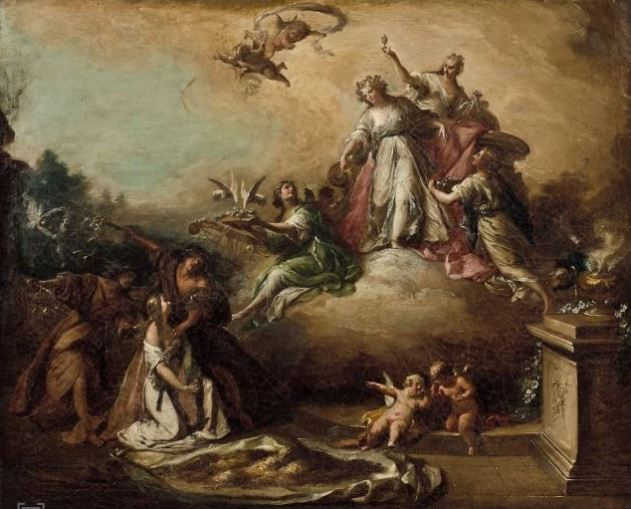
Venus Asking Loneliness and Sadness to Punish Psyche

Other notable works:

- Virgin, St Anne, with Saints Carlo and Geronimo in the Chapel of the Assumption in the church of Spirito Santo
- Virgin of the Rosary with Santa Rosa for the Chapel of the Prince of Roccella in the church of San Domenico Maggiore
- Ceilings for the Palazzo Francavilla (now known as the Palazzo Cellammare), painted alongside Pietro Bardellino and Giacinto Diano

His pupils included Paolo Girgenti and Giuseppe Camerata, as well as two of his own sons, Alessandro and Odoardo.
