= Damato =

Damato is a surname. Notable people with the surname include:

- Anthony P. Damato (1922–1944), United States Marine
  - USS Damato, Gearing-class destroyer of the United States Navy
- Antonio Damato (born 1972), Italian football referee
- Ġużè Damato (Joseph Damato, 1886–1963), Maltese architect
