= Michael Fischetti =

American stage actor and film actor

Michael Fischetti (born December 21, 1936) is an American stage actor and film actor. His performance in the theatre play Hughie received strong reviews in New York when it ran on Theater Row, at the South Street Theater in 1982. The New York Times described Mr. Fischetti's performance as "an evocative blend of Bogart (an occasional rasp) and Walter Matthau (a deadpan sense of mirth)." The twin bill of Hughie and Before Breakfast then played in Vienna, Austria.

== Early life ==
Fischetti is an Italian American, born in Brooklyn NY, son of Charles and Rose Fischetti. Michael Fischetti studied acting with Mme. Soloviova of the Moscow Art Theater and Lee Strasberg at the Actors Studio.

== Career ==
Michael Fischetti has enjoyed a varied acting career in New York and in regional theaters throughout the United States and Canada. On Broadway, he was Judd Hirsch's standby in Lanford Wilson's Pulitzer Prize winning play, Talley's Folly. Off- Broadway, at the Cherry Lane Theater, he played Clov in Samuel Beckett's Endgame. From 1978 until 1990 he was Co-Artistic Director alongside Jean Sullivan of South Street Theatre Company, on Theatre Row at 424 W 42nd St. They produced 50 plays of note he created original adaptations of Spoon River Anthology and Moby Dick, in which he played Captain Ahab. Mr. Fischetti's regional appearances include a 6-month tour of Studio Arena Theatre, Syracuse Stage, GeVa, and Capital Rep playing the lead role of Eddie Carbone in Arthur Miller's A View From the Bridge. He has also played Richard Roma in David Mamet's Glengarry Glen Ross at the Syracuse Stage, Capital Rep, and The Philadelphia Theatre Company and Harry Bales in The Sea Horse at Capital Rep.

Mr Fischetti's film credits are Prizzi's Honor, Frank Gilroy's The Gig, F/X. Internal Affairs, and Sea Of Love.
