= Palazzo Buono =

Building in Naples, Italy

Coordinates: 40.84295°N 14.24868°E

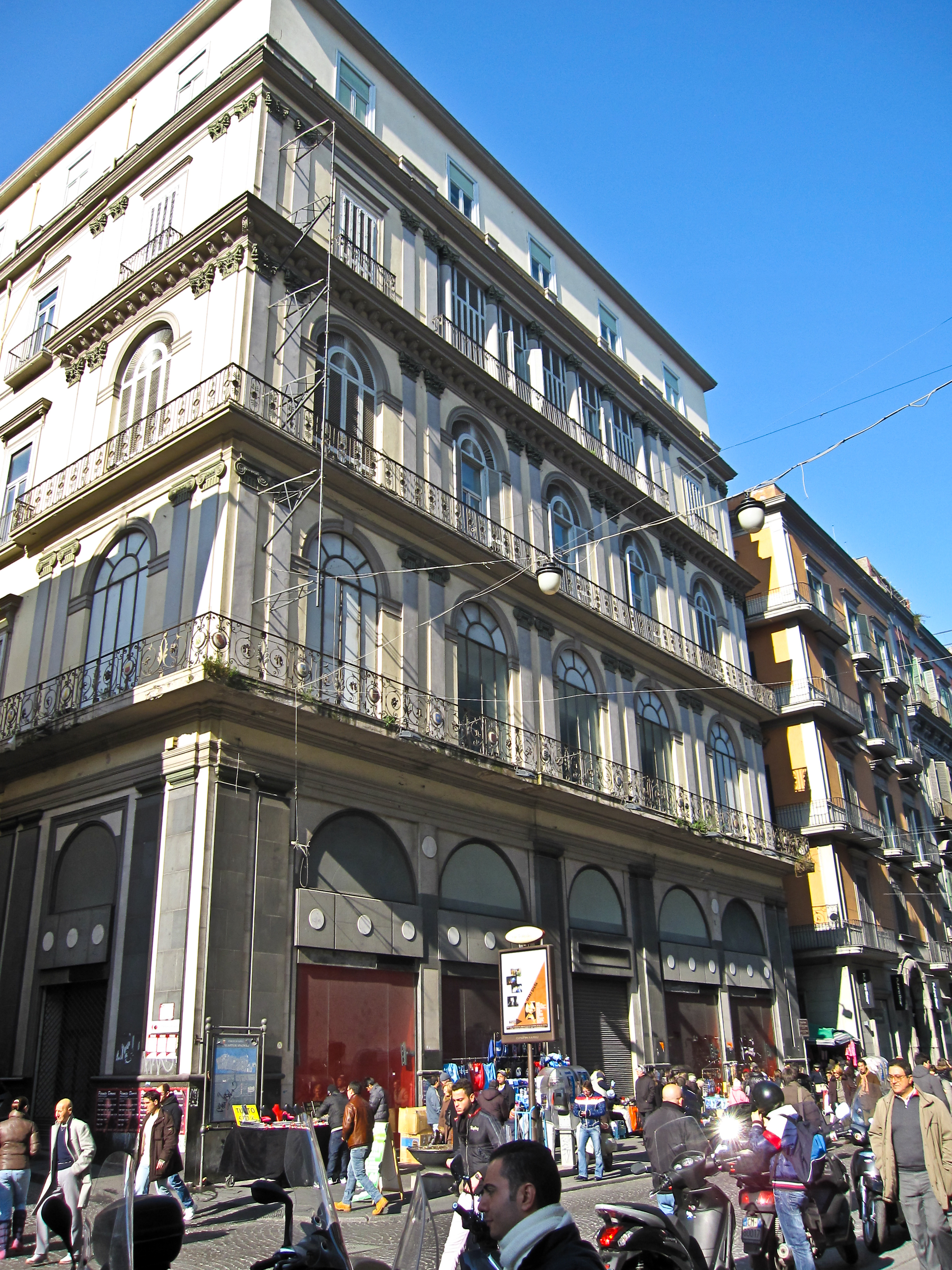
Exterior

The Palazzo Buono is a palace in Naples, located on via Toledo in the Montecalvario district. It was first commissioned in the 17th century by the De Curtis family and designed by Bartolomeo Picchiatti. It later housed the Monte dei Poveri Vergognosi bank and during the ten years of French occupation it became the tribunal of commerce.

After the French departed, it was bought by the Buono family, who in 1826 took on Gaetano Genovese to rebuild it in the neoclassical style. It was later acquired by the Bocconi brothers, who turned it into a department store before selling it in 1921 to the Società Magazzini Milanesi, which became La Rinascente. In 2008 La Rinascente shut down and the palace remained closed until 2011, when it became an H&M store.

== Bibliography ==
- (in Italian) Italo Ferraro, Napoli: atlante della città storica, Volume 3, CLEAN, 2008
