= Odoardo Fischetti =

Italian painter

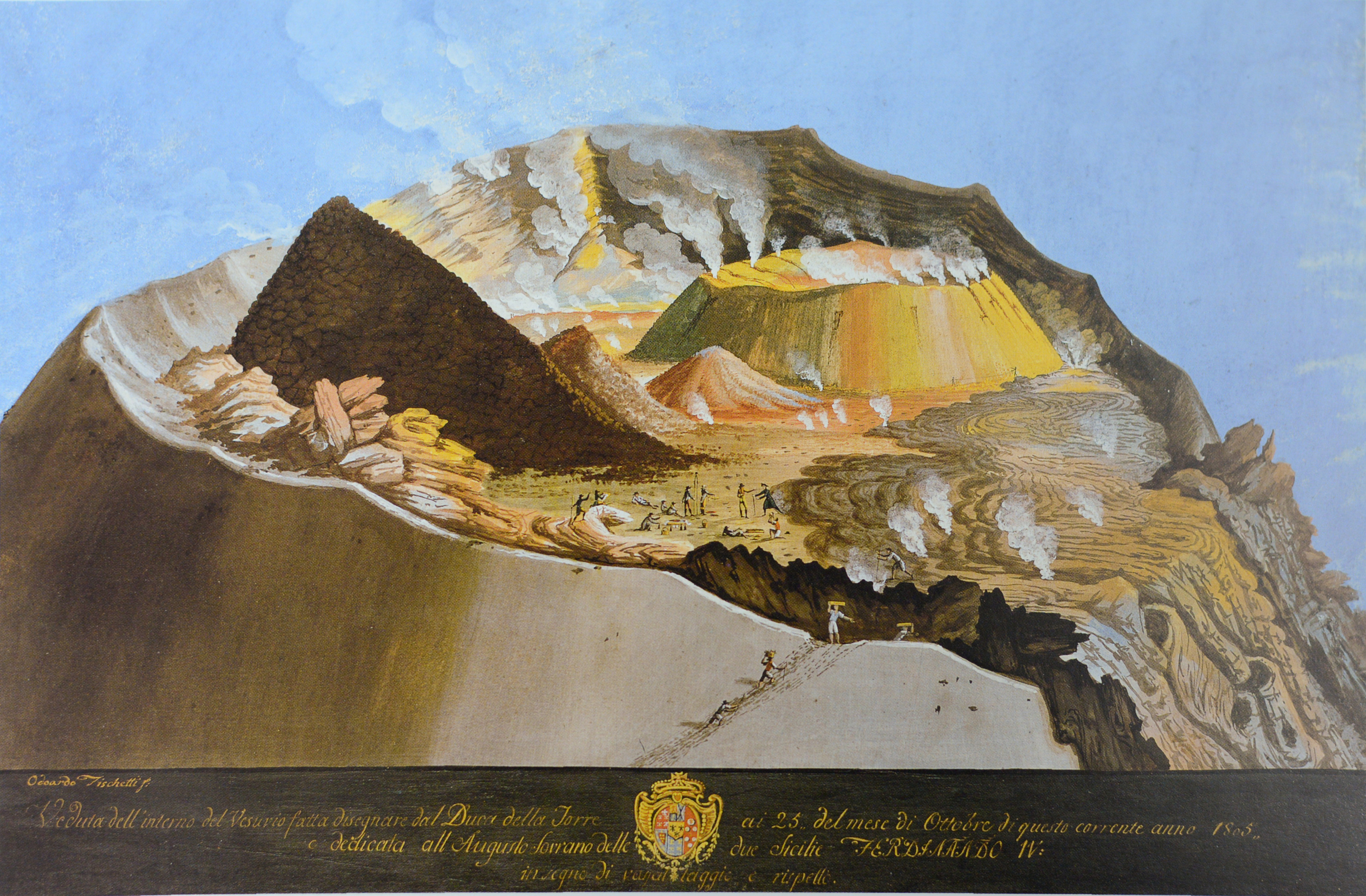
The Interior of Vesuvius

Odoardo Maria Saverio Fischetti (30 April 1770 – 15 November 1827) was an Italian painter of landscapes and historical scenes in a Neoclassical style.

== Life and work ==
Odoardo Fischetti was born in Naples to the fresco painter Fedele Fischetti and his wife Marianna, née Borrelli. His father provided his first lessons in art. His younger brother, Alessandro, also became a painter.

From 1803 to 1804, he made additions to his father's frescoes at the Palace of Portici. In 1805, he created some vedute in gouache, depicting the interior of Vesuvius. They were commissioned by Duke Ascanio Della Torre, the author of various scientific reports on the volcano's eruptions.

With the arrival of the French Napoleonic administration of Joachim Murat in 1808, he painted a series of historical canvases, including Murat Directs the Capture of Capri from Massa Lubrense and its companion piece, Capture of Capri by the French. He became a master of design at the Royal College of the Navy in 1809. During the following years, he would work at the Royal Palace of Caserta and in San Leucio.

After the fall of Murat in 1815, he devoted himself almost entirely to religious paintings. These include a Virgin, Saint Blaise, Andrea, Erasmo and Alfonso Maria de Liguori (1821), for the Ccollegiata di San Giovanni Battista in Avella; a Madonna and Child between Saints Simon and Jude; for the church of Santa Maria della Mercede a Montecalvario; a Transport of the Holy Ark (1823), for the church of San Biagio in Cardito; and a Saint Francis receiving the Stigmata, for the Oratorio della Confraternita dei Bianchi dei Santi Francesco e Matteo in Naples.

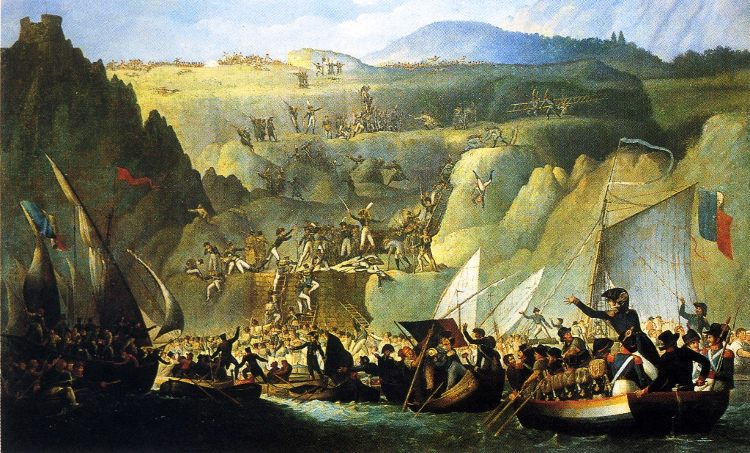
The French Capture of Capri

He was married twice: first to Emilia Catozzi, with whom he had four children, and then to Maria Giuseppa Milzi, with whom he had another five. He died in Naples.
