= Ronald Fischetti =

American lawyer (1936–2023)

Ronald Paul Fischetti (May 25, 1936 – November 25, 2023) was an American lawyer who represented the current president, Donald Trump, Robert Garcia, and many other high-profile clients. He died at the age of 87.
