= Ferdinando Manlio =

Italian sculptor

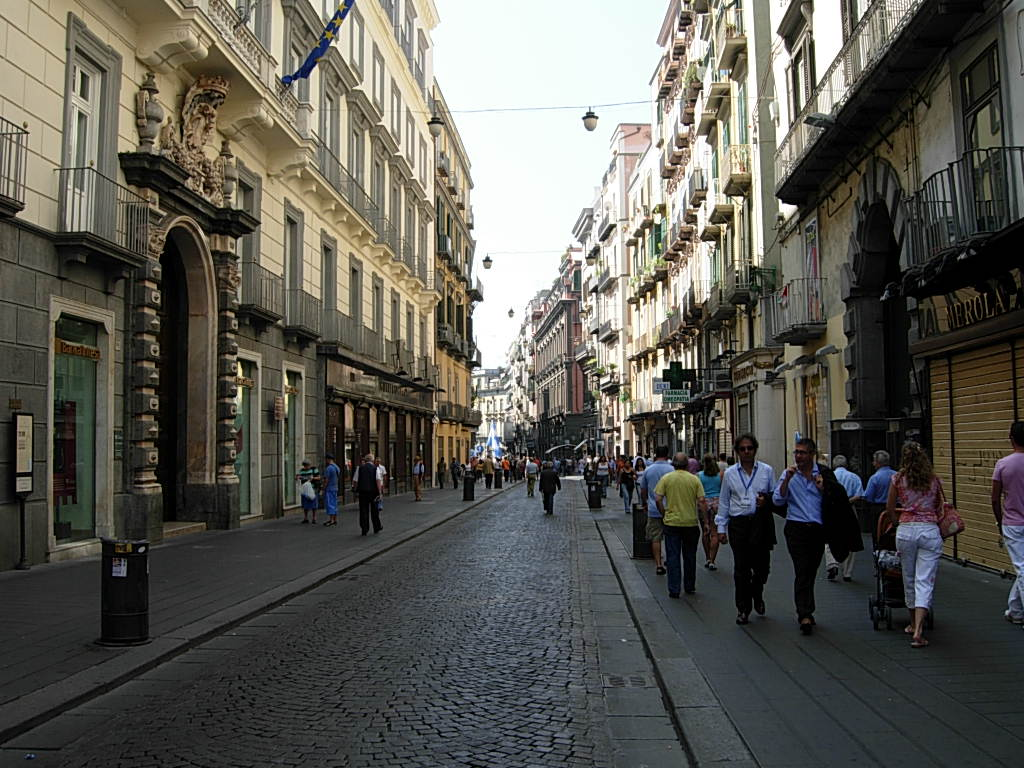
via Toledo today

Ferdinando Manlio (died in 1570) was an Italian sculptor, architect and urban planner of the Renaissance, active in Naples. He trained under the sculptor Giovanni da Nola.

From 1540, he led the rebuilding of the Basilica of the Santissima Annunziata Maggiore, along with Giovanni Benincasa. The present church however was rebuilt after a fire destroyed Manlio's building in the 18th century. As a result of this, the viceroy of Naples, Pedro Álvarez de Toledo asked Manlio and Benincasa to design a long road connecting the Royal Palace of Naples to one of the city gates. This is now the via Toledo. The pair also redesigned the Castel Capuano, transforming it from a military building into the new Palace of Justice.
