= Paolo Girgenti =

Italian painter

Paolo Girgenti (1767/69 – 1819) was an Italian painter of the late 18th and early 19th-centuries, active in Naples.

He was born in Agrigento, Sicily, known in the Sicilian language as Girgenti. He studied, along with a Giuseppe Camerata from Sciacca, under Fedele Fischetti. He became the president of the Neapolitan Academy of Fine Arts at the beginning of the 19th century. He made a copy of Raphael's Repose in Egypt. He painted a Sleeping Cupid, of which a copy is found in the Museo Pepoli in Trapani.
