= Palazzo Doria d'Angri =

Coordinates: 40°50′49″N 14°14′59″E

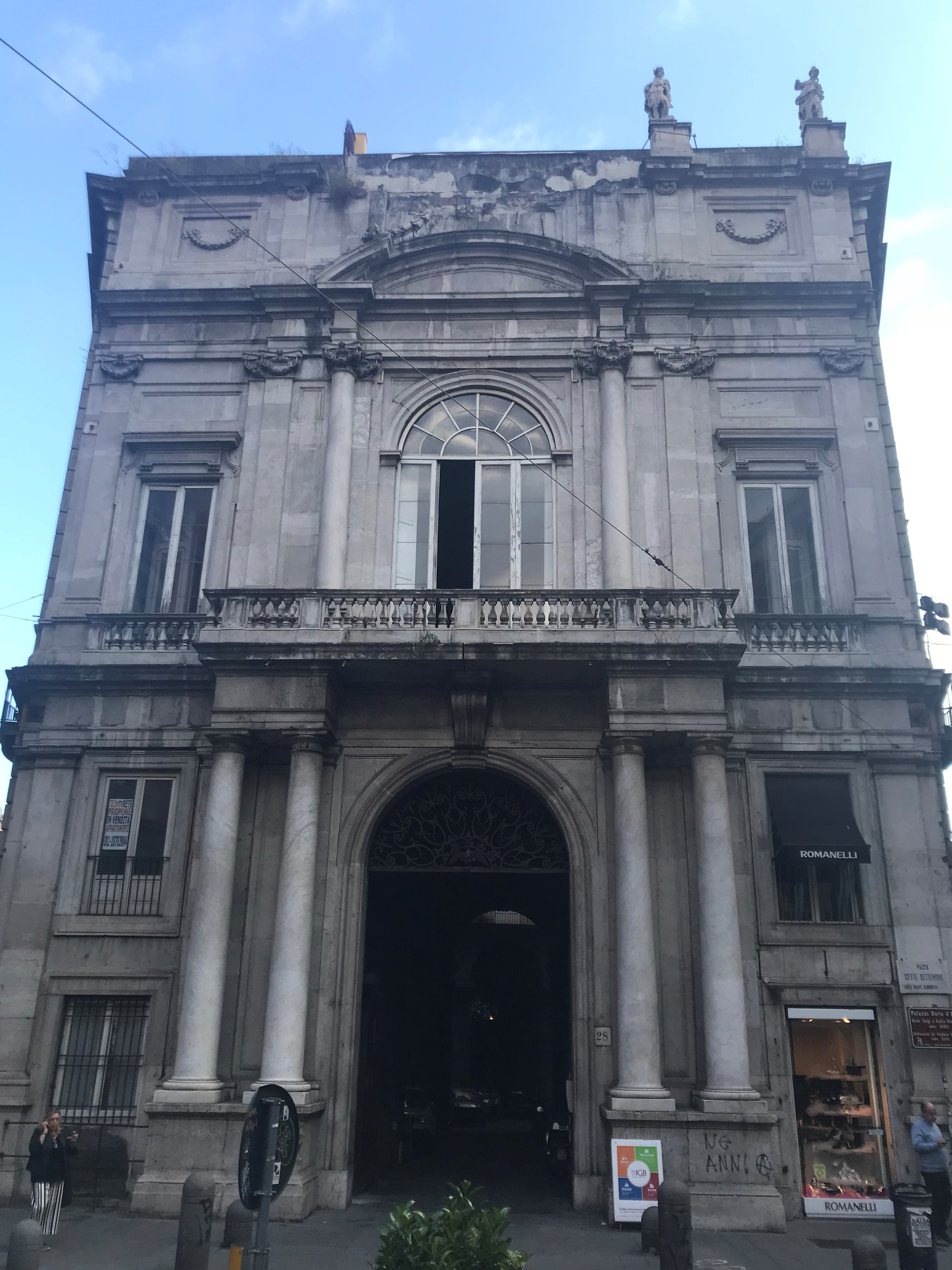
- The main façade on Piazza 7 Settembre
- Interactive map of the Palazzo Doria d'Angri area

General information
- Status: Residential
- Architectural style: Neoclassical
- Location: Naples, Italy, Piazza 7 Settembre, 28
- Construction started: 1760
- Completed: 1778
- Client: Family Doria D'Angri

Design and construction
- Architects: Luigi Vanvitelli; Ferdinando Fuga; Mario Gioffredo; Carlo Vanvitelli

The Palazzo Doria d’Angri is an historic palace and monument in Naples in southern Italy located in Piazza 7 Settembre in the corner with the busy Via Toledo and Via Monteoliveto.

== History ==
The building was commissioned by Prince Marcantonio Doria on the site of two previous houses of the 1500s. In 1760 the prince died, and the implementation of the Family Palace passed to his son Giovanni Carlo who entrusted the architect and engineer Luigi Vanvitelli. After the death of Vanvitelli, in 1773, the plans passed first to Ferdinando Fuga, then to Mario Gioffredo, and lastly to Carlo Vanvitelli, son of Luigi.

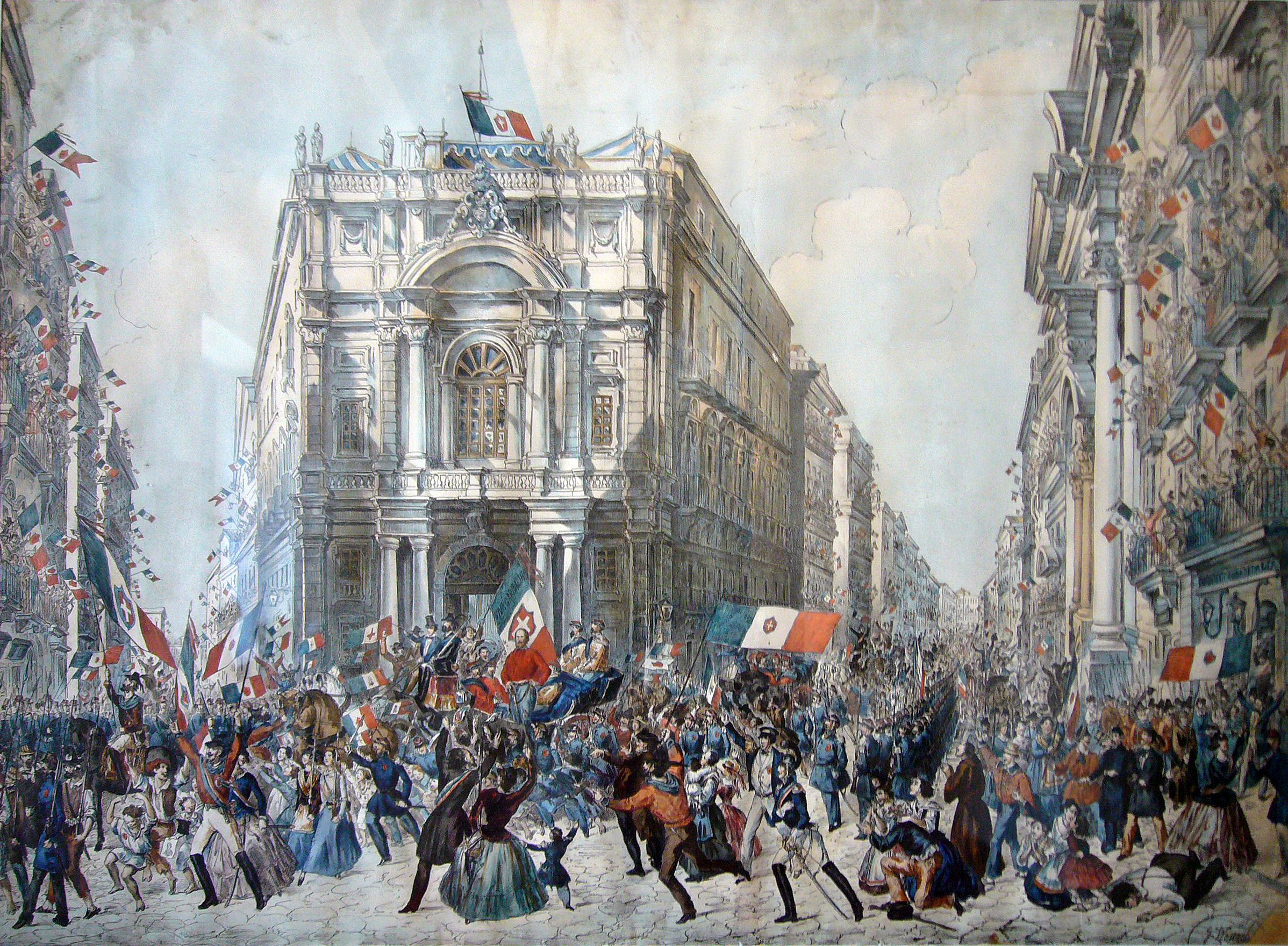
The annexation of Naples on 7 September 1860 with in foreground the façade of the palace

In 1860 the palace became famous because on 7 September from the main balcony Giuseppe Garibaldi announced the annexation of the Kingdom of the Two Sicilies into the Kingdom of Italy.

In 1940 the collection of Marcantonio Doria kept in the palace, which included also a Rubens' painting and Caravaggio's "Martirio di Sant'Orsola" (thought to be his last painting), was sold at auction. During World War II the building suffered some damage, especially on the top side of the façade, losing six of the eight sculptures which beautified the upper edge and the noble crest of the Doria's Family located above the main window of the façade.

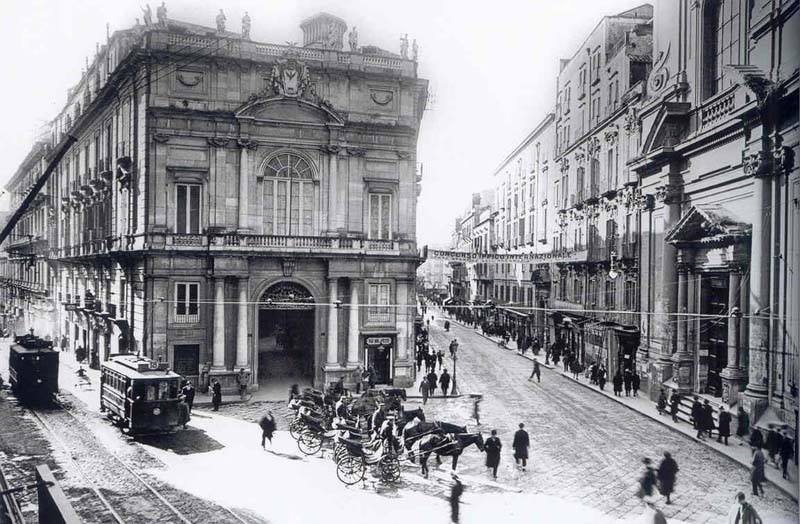
Palazzo Doria d'Angri before World War II
