= Giuseppe D'Amato =

Italian historian

Giuseppe D'Amato (born 1965) is an Italian historian, specializing in Russia and the former USSR, and a columnist of international politics.

== Biography ==
After getting a degree in Italy in the 1980s, D'Amato became a scholar of the Russian academician Sigurd Ottovich Schmidt (in Russian Шмидт, Сигурд Оттович) at Moscow's Historical-Archive Institute (Russian State University for the Humanities) in the 1990s. He got a Ph.D. in history.

== Writing ==
D'Amato wrote a book about Italian travellers to Russia in the 15th -16th centuries and studied Russian-Italian relationships. Some of his articles have been published in languages other than Italian. He wrote three books respectively on the subjects of the break-up of the USSR, the EU enlargement to the East, and euro-integration.

== Selected bibliography ==
- Сочинения итальянцев о России XV – XVI конца веков, Москва 1995. (Italian reports on Russia 15th -16th centuries) Book in Russian.
- Review Foreign descriptions of Muscovy. An Analytic Bibliography of Primary and Secondary Sources by Marshall Poe in «Slavic Review» Vol. 56, No. 3, Autumn 1997, pp. 566 – 567.
- Il Diario del Cambiamento. Urss 1990 – Russia 1993. Greco&Greco editori, Milano, 1998. (The Diary of the Change. USSR 1990 – Russia 1993) Book in Italian.
- Viaggio nell'Hansa baltica. L'Unione europea e l'allargamento ad Est. Greco&Greco editori, Milano, 2004. (Travel to the Baltic Hansa. The European Union and its enlargement to the East) Book in Italian.
- L'EuroSogno e i nuovi Muri ad Est. L'Unione europea e la dimensione orientale. Greco&Greco editori, Milano, 2008. (The EuroDream and the new Walls at East. The European Union and the Eastern dimension) Book in Italian.
- The new Europe in the midst of separations, reconciliations, and new unions, in «2015 Scientific Economic Magazine», No.1 issue 1, edizioni Palager, Bergamo, 2009.
