= Pietro Bardellino =

Italian painter (1728–1806)

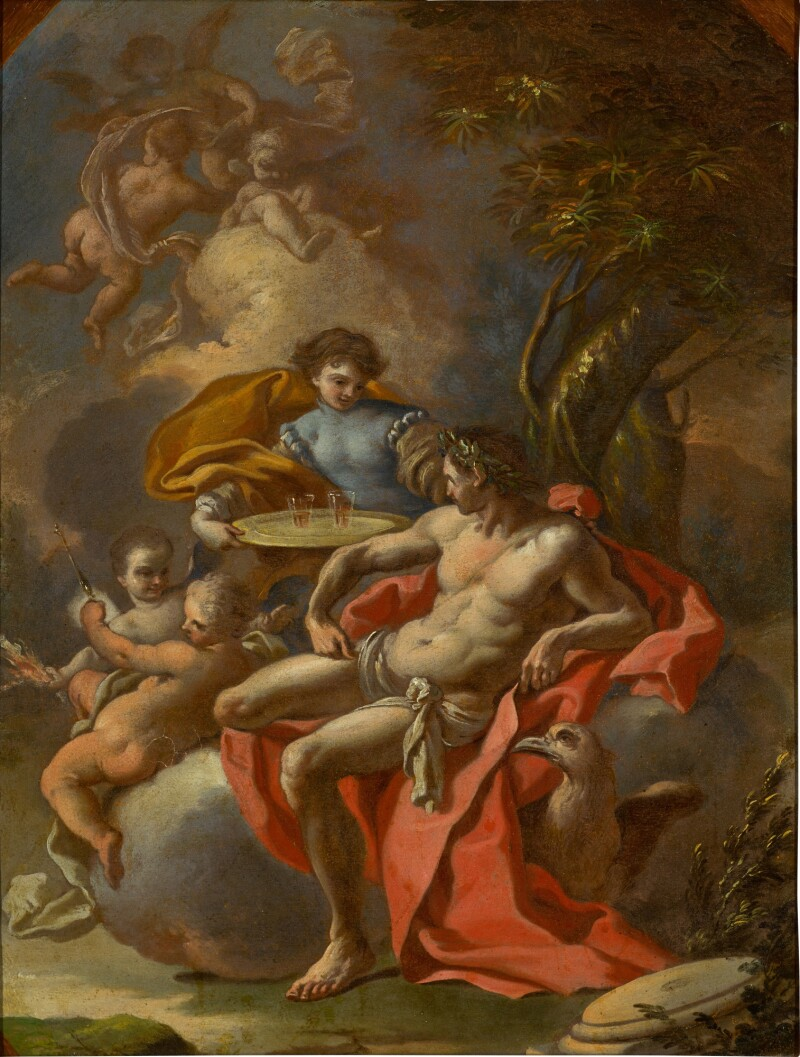
Zeus and Ganymede

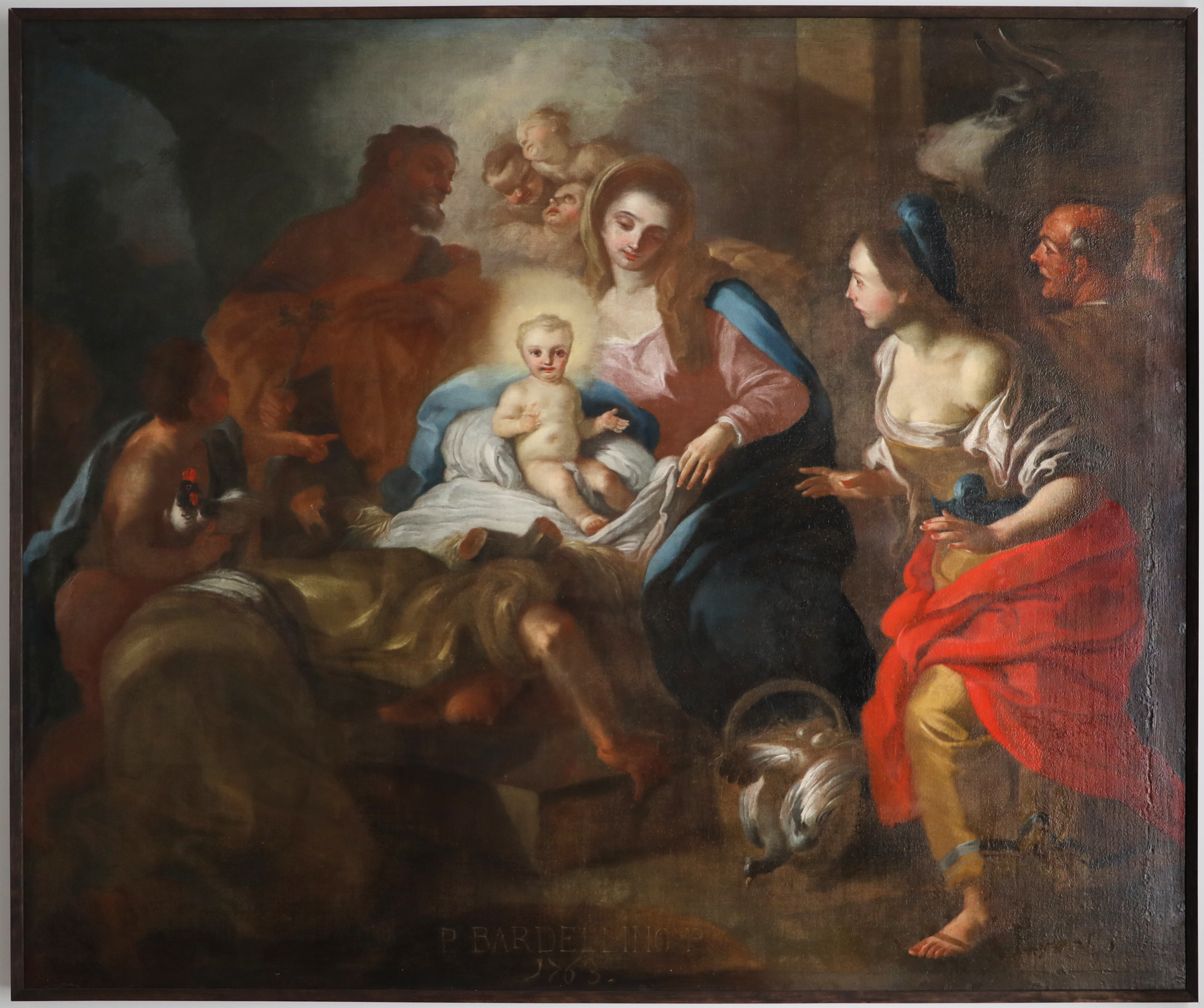
Adoration of the Shepherds

Pietro Bardellino (17 February 1728, Naples – 1806, Naples) was an Italian painter in the Rococo style.

== Life and works ==
His personal style derives from that of his teacher, Francesco De Mura. As early as 1750, he was commissioned to paint the ceiling in the large room of the Ospedale degli Incurabili, depicting Machaon curing Menelaus.

He created other notable, decorative works at the Oratorio della Confraternita dei Bianchi dello Spirito Santo (1753), the Cattedrale di Bitonto (1764), and the basilica of San Giacomo degli Spagnoli (1778); all of a religious nature. He also decorated the homes of several noble families.

In 1773, he was appointed a member of the Accademia Napoletana del Disegno (now the Accademia di Belle Arti di Napoli), to succeed the recently deceased Luigi Vanvitelli. In 1779, he was named a master of the Accademia. In 1789, the protested the change in emphasis from Rococo to Neoclassical styles, in a letter to the King, and his influence there waned.

His largest, most challenging project came in 1781: the ceiling of the Grand Hall at the Palazzo degli Studi, which later became part of the Real Museo Borbonico. It depicts the apotheosis of King Ferdinand IV and Queen Maria Carolina.

During his later years, his notable works include a portrait of the architect Gaetano Barba (1790), and the frescoes for the Biblioteca dei Girolamini (1792). Several of his works at the Basilica di Santa Chiara have been lost.

In 1803, he and Desiderio De Angelis (1743-1811) were chosen to operate the nude drawing school at the Accademia, but his appointment was not confirmed until the year he died.
