= List of canonically crowned Marian images in Italy =

The following list shows a selection of Marian images in the Catholic Church venerated in Italy that were granted a pontifical decree of canonical coronation. Since April 2026, there have been 640 Marian images (including the six which are in the Vatican) in Italy that have been honored a coronation by the Holy See, since the first in 1631. (Note: More Marian images have recently been crowned personally by the pope, but most of these cases do not possess a decree from the Dicastery for Divine Worship and the Discipline of the Sacraments. Hence, those are not counted and included in this list.) (Note: Counting also Italy’s Santo Bambino of Aracoeli (1897), Bambino Gesù di Praga of Arenzano (1924), Bambino Gesù di Praga of Pagani (1999), and Saint Joseph of Arcevia (1904) brings the total count of canonically crowned images in Italy to 644.)

== 17th century ==
Official title of the image	Date of coronation	Place of devotion	Authorization by	Marian image	Shrine of devotion
La Madonna della Febbre	27 May 1631	Sacristy of Saint Peter's Basilica	Pope Urban VIII		
La Madonna dei Monti	3 September 1632	Santa Maria ai Monti, Rome	Pope Urban VIII		
Madonna di Strada Cupa	5 April 1634	Santa Maria in Trastevere, Rome	Pope Urban VIII		
Madonna della Pace	29 July 1634	Santa Maria della Pace, Rome	Pope Urban VIII		
Madonna del Popolo	14 August 1634	Santa Maria del Popolo, Rome	Pope Urban VIII		
Madonna della Consolazione	7 December 1634	Santa Maria della Consolazione, Rome	Pope Urban VIII		
Madonna della Vittoria (Icon of the Nativity in the apse)	6 July 1635	Santa Maria della Vittoria, Rome	Pope Urban VIII		
La Madonna di Grottapinta	22 August 1635	San Lorenzo in Damaso, Rome	Pope Urban VIII		
Our Lady of the Annunciation	30 December 1635	Santa Maria Annunziata a Tor de' Specchi, Rome	Pope Urban VIII		
Madonna Aracoeli	29 March 1636	Santa Maria in Ara Coeli on the Capitoline Hill, Rome	Pope Urban VIII		
Nostra Signora della Fortuna	17 January 1637	Chiesa dei Santi Vittore e Carlo, Genoa	Pope Urban VIII		
Our Lady of Piety	31 August 1637	Chapel of the Pieta, Saint Peter's Basilica	Pope Urban VIII (Note: Pontifical decree of coronation Domina Coronatum Est signed and notarized on 14 August 1637 by Pope Urban VIII and granted to the patronal donor, Lord Ascanio Pallavicini y Sforza and Canon priest of the Vatican Chapter, Monsignor Ugo Ubaldini. The crown was manufactured by Italian artisan, Fantino Taglietti, who charged 564 Italian scudo coins at the time. The cherubic angels were added in 1713 by his descendant, later relocated to the Chapel of the Holy Choir in 1749. Vatican Secret Archives.)		
Madonna della Strada	15 August 1638	Church of the Gesù, Rome	Pope Urban VIII		
Madonna di Santa Teresa (Note: Icon of Saint Teresa of Ávila with the Virgin Mary and Saint Joseph, now in the Carmelite Monastery of Antignano, Livorno.)	16 September 1638	Santa Teresa alle Quattro Fontane, Rome (extinct former shrine) Carmelite Monastery of Antignano, Livorno (current)	Pope Urban VIII		
Madonna di Mantua	28 November 1640	Mantua Cathedral	Pope Urban VIII		
Madonna del Rosario	6 December 1640	Santa Maria sopra Minerva, Rome	Pope Urban VIII		
Virgo Virginum et Mater Omnium	4 March 1641	Sant'Agostino, Rome	Pope Urban VIII		
Madonna Advocata	14 March 1641	Santi Domenico e Sisto, Rome (former) Santa Maria del Rosario, Rome (current shrine since 1931)	Pope Urban VIII		
Madonna del Carmine	15 July 1641	Santa Maria in Traspontina, Rome	Pope Urban VIII		
Madonna di San Cosimato	11 August 1641	San Cosimato, Rome	Pope Urban VIII		
Madonna Advocata Sanctae Mariae Matris Ecclesiae in Via Lata (Note: Marian title granted to the image through a decree signed and dated on 25 March 1976 to the Diocese of Rome. Prot. CD 766/75. Vatican Secret Archives.)	1 February 1643	Santa Maria in Via Lata, Rome	Pope Urban VIII		
Madonna del Pianto	20 May 1643	Santa Maria del Pianto, Rome	Pope Urban VIII		
Madonna del Soccorso	17 November 1643	Chapel of Pope Gregory XIII within Saint Peter's Basilica	Pope Urban VIII		
Madonna delle Grazie	9 June 1644 22 June 1924	Santa Maria delle Grazie a Porta Angelica, Rome (former) Santa Maria delle Grazie a Via Trionfale, Rome	Pope Urban VIII Pope Pius XI		
Our Lady of Loreto	12 December 1644	San Salvatore in Lauro, Rome	Pope Innocent X		
Madonna della Colonna Mater Ecclesiae	1 January 1645	Private Chapel of Pope Leo the Great in Saint Peter's Basilica	Pope Innocent X		
Madonna di Sant'Alessio	15 June 1645	Santi Bonifacio ed Alessio on the Aventine Hill, Rome	Pope Innocent X		
Madonna di Santa Marta (Note: Icon of Mary and the Child Jesus sitting on Saint Anne's lap.)	20 November 1645	Santa Marta al Collegio Romano, Rome ("deconsecrated") (Note: This icon is now in Milan)	Pope Innocent X		
La Madonna dei Miracoli	2 January 1646	Santa Maria dei Miracoli, Rome	Pope Innocent X		
La Madonna del Pozzo	17 January 1646	Santa Maria in Via, Rome	Pope Innocent X		
La Madonna della Purità	16 April 1646	Santa Maria della Purità, Rome (extinct former shrine) Santa Maria in Traspontina (current)	Pope Innocent X		
La Madonna della Scala	10 October 1646	Santa Maria della Scala, Rome	Pope Innocent X		
La Madonna delle Grotte	c. 1647	Santi Domenico e Sisto, Rome	Pope Innocent X		
Madonna del Fonte	8 June 1647	Baptistry of the Archbasilica of Saint John Lateran, Rome	Pope Innocent X		
La Madonna delle Grazie	14 August 1647	Santa Maria della Consolazione, Rome	Pope Innocent X		
Madonna della Misericordia	22 March 1648	San Giovanni dei Fiorentini, Rome	Pope Innocent X		
Madonna della Sanità	26 July 1648	San Lorenzo in Lucina, Rome	Pope Innocent X		
Madonna della Vallicella	9 July 1649	Santa Maria in Vallicella, Rome	Pope Innocent X		
Madonna della Catena	31 January 1650	San Silvestro al Quirinale, Rome	Pope Innocent X		
Madonna di San Giovannino (Note: Icon of the Virgin Mary depicted raising her both hands.)	3 June 1650	Rome	Pope Innocent X		
Madonna di Costantinopoli	26 January 1651	Santa Maria Odigitria al Tritone, Rome	Pope Innocent X		
Madonna della Salute	4 March 1651	Santi Cosma e Damiano, Rome	Pope Innocent X		
Madonna del Portico Virgo lactans	2 July 1651	Santa Maria in Campitelli, Rome	Pope Innocent X		
Madonna di Campitelli	2 July 1651	Oratorio di Campitelli, Rome	Pope Innocent X		
Madonna delle Grazie	2 July 1651	San Paolo alla Regola, Rome	Pope Innocent X		
Madonna di Sant'Anna	7 January 1652	Sant'Anna a Funari, Rome (extinct former shrine) Lateran Baptistery, Rome (current)	Pope Innocent X		
Our Lady of the Annunciation	14 April 1652 30 April 1752	Avigliana	Pope Innocent X Pope Benedict XIV		
Santa Maria ad Martyres	20 July 1652	Pantheon, Rome	Pope Innocent X		
Santa Maria Liberatrice	9 January 1653	Santa Maria Liberatrice al Foro Romano, Rome (former) Santa Maria Liberatrice a Monte Testaccio, Rome	Pope Innocent X		
Madonna delle Grazie	20 July 1653	Santa Maria in Posterula, Rome (extinct former shrine) San Patrizio, Rome (current)	Pope Innocent X		
Maria, Regina degli Apostoli	15 August 1653	Sant'Apollinare, Rome	Pope Innocent X		
Madonna delle Grazie	21 July 1654	Santissima Trinità dei Pellegrini, Rome	Pope Innocent X		
La Madonna delle Grazie	15 December 1654	San Salvatore in Lauro, Rome	Pope Innocent X		
Madonna Salus Infirmorum	5 April 1655	Santo Spirito in Sassia, Rome	Pope Innocent X		
Madonna Advocata	2 July 1655	Santa Maria della Concezione in Campo Marzio, Rome	Pope Alexander VII		
Madonna di Santa Prassede	16 August 1655	Santa Prassede, Rome	Pope Alexander VII		
Madonna and Child (Generic Title)	8 April 1656	Santa Maria in Monserrato degli Spagnoli, Rome	Pope Alexander VII		
Madonna dell'Orto	19 August 1657	Santa Maria dell'Orto, Rome	Pope Alexander VII		
Madonna delle Grazie	21 January 1658	San Rocco, Rome	Pope Alexander VII		
Madonna di San Gregorio	14 September 1658	San Gregorio Magno al Celio, Rome	Pope Alexander VII		
Madonna del Carmine	20 January 1659	San Martino ai Monti, Rome	Pope Alexander VII		
Madonna della Clemenza	2 November 1659	Santa Maria in Trastevere, Rome	Pope Alexander VII		
Madonna di Montesanto	3 December 1659	Santa Maria in Montesanto, Rome	Pope Alexander VII		
Madonna dei Miracoli	5 December 1659	San Giacomo in Augusta, Rome	Pope Alexander VII		
Beata Vergine del Santo Rosario di Fontanellato	18 August 1660 24 May 1925	Sanctuary of the Blessed Virgin of the Holy Rosary of Fontanellato, Parma	Pope Alexander VII Pope Pius XI		
Madonna di Loreto di Fornari	7 September 1660	Santa Maria di Loreto, Rome	Pope Alexander VII		
Madonna della Misericordia	6 November 1661	San Giovanni Battista Decollato, Rome	Pope Alexander VII		
Madonna dell'Orazione	6 November 1661	Santa Maria dell'Orazione e Morte, Rome	Pope Alexander VII		
Madonna delle Grazie	29 May 1662	Sanctuary of Valsorda, Garessio	Pope Alexander VII		
Santa Maria Nova	12 September 1662	Santa Francesca Romana, Rome	Pope Alexander VII		
Madonna del Carmine	7 October 1662	San Crisogono, Rome	Pope Alexander VII		
Madonna di Scossacavalli Mater Peregrinorum	19 March 1664	San Giacomo Scossacavalli, Rome (extinct former shrine) Saint Peter's Basilica (current)	Pope Alexander VII		
Madonna della Lampada	19 March 1664	San Giovanni Calibita, Rome	Pope Alexander VII		
Madonna delle Grazie	17 May 1665	Santi Celso e Giuliano, Rome	Pope Alexander VII		
Madonna del Sole	18 May 1665	Santa Maria del Sole, Rome (extinct former shrine) Oratory of Santissimo Crocifisso, Rome (current)	Pope Alexander VII		
Madonna del Suffragio	25 January 1666	Santa Maria del Suffragio, Rome	Pope Alexander VII		
Madonna del Gonfalone	30 April 1666	Santa Lucia del Gonfalone, Rome	Pope Alexander VII		
Madonna degli Angeli	23 May 1667	Santa Lucia della Tinta, Rome	Pope Alexander VII		
Madonna del Rimedio (Note: Icon of the Madonna and Child now at the church of San Crisogono, Rome.)	7 September 1667	San Dionisio alle quattro Fontane, Rome (extinct former shrine) San Crisogono, Rome (current)	Pope Alexander VII		
Madonna Salus Infirmorum	6 July 1668 30 August 1868	Santa Maria Maddalena, Rome	Pope Clement IX Pope Pius IX		
Madonna del Rosario	6 July 1668	San Michele a Ripa, Rome	Pope Clement IX		
Madonna della Quercia	6 September 1670	Santa Maria della Quercia, Rome	Pope Clement X		
La Madonna delle Grazie	31 January 1671	San Biagio della Pagnotta, Rome	Pope Clement X		
Madonna di Cosmedin	23 November 1672 20 June 1920	Santa Maria in Cosmedin, Rome	Pope Clement X Pope Benedict XV		
Beata Vergine Ausiliatrice del Popolo Modenese	4 April 1673	Chiesa di San Giorgio, Modena	Pope Clement X		
Madonna di Sant'Aniceto	15 April 1673	Chiesa di Sant'Aniceto, Palazzo Altemps, Rome	Pope Clement X		
Madonna delle Grazie	c. 1674	Santa Susanna, Rome	Pope Clement X		
La Madonna della Ghiara	13 May 1674	Basilica della Ghiara, Reggio Emilia	Pope Clement X		
La Madonna di San Salvatore (Note: Icon of Saint Joachim carrying the infant Mary.)	7 February 1675	San Salvatore alle Coppelle, Rome	Pope Clement X		
Madonna di Sant'Ignazio	3 March 1676	Sant'Ignazio, Rome	Pope Clement X		
Madonna di Monterone	6 May 1676	Santa Maria in Monterone, Rome	Pope Clement X		
Madonna di Porto Paradisi	29 July 1676	Santa Maria Portae Paradisi, Rome	Pope Clement X		
Madonna della Pieta Mater Pietatis	6 February 1677	Oratory of San Francesco Saverio del Caravita, Rome	Pope Innocent XI		
Madonna dei Crociferi	29 May 1677	Santa Maria in Trivio, Rome	Pope Innocent XI		
Madonna delle Grazie	1 December 1677	Sant'Adriano al Foro, Rome	Pope Innocent XI		
Madonna del Rifugio	28 July 1678	Cappella del Purgatorio, San Lorenzo in Lucina, Rome	Pope Innocent XI		
Madonna della Purità	7 December 1678	Sant'Andrea della Valle, Rome	Pope Innocent XI		
Madonna delle Grazie o del Suffragio	13 March 1679	Santi Vincenzo e Anastasio a Trevi, Rome	Pope Innocent XI		
Madonna delle Gioie	8 July 1679	Oratorio del Santissimo Sacramento al Laterano, Scala Santa, Rome	Pope Innocent XI		
Madonna di San Biagio	12 October 1681	San Biagio, Montepulciano	Pope Innocent XI		
Madonna di Provenzano	1 November 1681	Santa Maria in Provenzano, Siena	Pope Innocent XI		
Madonna delle Grazie	2 May 1682	Velletri Cathedral	Pope Innocent XI		
Madonna di San Giovanni	10 May 1682	Ripatransone Cathedral	Pope Innocent XI		
Madonna del Buon Consiglio	17 November 1682	Genazzano	Pope Innocent XI		
Madonna del Soccorso	28 November 1683	Genoa Cathedral	Pope Innocent XI		
Madonna del Ruscello	30 January 1684	Sanctuary of the Madonna del Ruscello, Vallerano	Pope Innocent XI		
Madonna del Transito	15 August 1684	Archbasilica of Saint John Lateran, Rome	Pope Innocent XI		
Madonna di Mongiovino	30 January 1685	Tavernelle, Panicale	Pope Innocent XI		
Madonna della Ferita	5 February 1686	Chapel of the Most Blessed Sacrament, Forlì Cathedral	Pope Innocent XI		
Madonna della Misericordia	28 November 1686	Rome	Pope Innocent XI		
Madonna dell'Ellera	30 May 1687	Cortona	Pope Innocent XI		
Madonna di Tor de Specchi	17 June 1687	Monastery of Tor de' Specchi, Rome	Pope Innocent XI		
La Madonna delle Grazie di Pesaro	19 October 1687	Santa Maria delle Grazie, Pesaro	Pope Innocent XI		
Madonna Advocata	12 September 1688	Monastero di Santa Maria in Campo Marzio, San Gregorio Nazianzeno, Rome	Pope Innocent XI		
Madonna di Grottaferrata	16 November 1688	Territorial Abbacy of Saint Mary of Grottaferrata	Pope Innocent XI		
Madonna del Sasso	30 April 1690	Sant'Agostino, Lucca	Pope Alexander VIII		
Madonna delle Grazie di Montenero	4 May 1690	Sanctuary of Montenero, Livorno	Pope Alexander VIII		
Madonna di Tirano	29 September 1690	Basilica of Tirano	Pope Innocent XI (Note: Pope Innocent XI granted the petition for the coronation, but the coronation took place during the pontificate of Pope Alexander VIII. Vatican Secret Archives.)		
Madonna delle Scuole Pie	25 March 1694	San Pantaleo, Rome	Pope Innocent XII		
La Madonna delle Neve	31 May 1694	Frosinone	Pope Innocent XI (Note: Pope Innocent XI granted the coronation, but the coronation took place during the pontificate of Pope Innocent XII. Vatican Secret Archives.)		
Maria Santissima Addolorata	17 April 1695	San Marcello al Corso, Rome	Pope Innocent XII		
Madonna del Popolo	2 July 1695	Pontremoli Cathedral	Pope Innocent XII		
Santa Maria delle Vergini	21 October 1696	Santa Maria delle Vergini, Macerata	Pope Innocent XII		
Madonna della Salute	6 December 1696	San Lorenzo in Piscibus, Rome	Pope Innocent XII		

== 18th century ==
Official title of the image	Date of coronation	Place of devotion	Authorization by	Marian image	Shrine of devotion
Madonna di Santissimo Nome di Maria	8 September 1703	San Bernardo della Compagnia, Rome (demolished since 1748) Santissimo Nome di Maria al Foro Traiano, Rome (current shrine since 1741)	Pope Clement XI		
Madonna di Cibona	1 June 1704	Tolfa	Pope Clement XI		
Madonna di San Brizio	18 June 1704	Orvieto Cathedral	Pope Clement XI		
Madonna del Carmine	10 August 1704	Basilica di San Martino	Pope Clement XI		
La Madonna delle Grazie	8 September 1704	San Giovanni Valdarno	Pope Clement XI		
Madonna delle Grazie	7 March 1705	Otranto Cathedral	Pope Clement XI		
Madonna del Lago	9 August 1705	Bertinoro	Pope Clement XI		
Madonna di Belvedere	11 November 1705	Sanctuary of the Madonna di Belvedere, Città di Castello	Pope Clement XI		
Madonna di San Martino	6 November 1707	Montepulciano Cathedral	Pope Clement XI		
Madonna delle Grazie	17 March 1708	Chiesa di San Cristoforo, Pennabilli	Pope Clement XI		
Madonna dei Ronchi	21 September 1709	Carrù	Pope Clement XI		
Madonna del Fonte di Caravaggio	30 September 1710	Caravaggio, Lombardy	Pope Clement XI		
Madonna di Montevergine di Avellino	14 May 1712	Avellino	Pope Clement XI		
Madonna di Capocroce	26 October 1713	Frascati	Pope Clement XI		
Beata Vergine del Piratello	15 August 1714	Imola	Pope Clement XI		
Maria Santissima Liberatrice	12 September 1715	Chiesa della Trinita, Viterbo	Pope Innocent XII (Note: The coronation is formally decreed, through the Vatican Chapter in 1696, due to preparations were unable to carry out the coronation until 1715. Vatican Secret Archives.)		
Madonna dell'Umiltà	20 September 1716	Basilica of the Madonna of Humility in Pistoia	Pope Clement XI		
Madonna della Lettera	2 May 1717	San Pietro in Montorio, Rome	Pope Clement XI		
Madonna dei Lumi	8 June 1717	Pieve Santo Stefano	Pope Clement XI		
Refugium Peccatorum	4 July 1717	Church of the Gesù, Frascati, Lazio	Pope Clement XI		
Madonna del Soccorso	24 March 1718	Madonna del Soccorso, Montalcino	Pope Clement XI		
Madonna della Misericordia	8 September 1720	Osimo	Pope Clement XI		
Madonna della Misericordia	25 August 1721	Santa Maria della Misericordia, Macerata	Pope Innocent XIII		
Madonna della Consolazione	15 September 1722	Reggio Calabria	Pope Innocent XIII		
Madonna de Finibus Terrae	21 November 1722	Santa Maria di Leuca	Pope Innocent XIII	framless	
Madonna delle Grazie	3 April 1723	Benevento	Pope Innocent XIII		
Madonna della Purità	7 September 1724	San Paolo Maggiore, Naples	Pope Benedict XIII		
Madonna dei Bisognosi	5 November 1724	Sanctuary of Santa Maria dei Bisognosi	Pope Benedict XIII		
La Madonna di Galloro	10 June 1726	Sanctuary of Santa Maria di Galloro, Ariccia	Pope Benedict XIII		
La Madonna della Rosa	1 September 1726	Ostra, Marche	Pope Benedict XIII		
Madonna del Suffragio	23 May 1728	Grotte di Castro	Pope Benedict XIII		
La Madonna delle Grazie o dell'Incoronata	29 August 1728	Arcidosso	Pope Benedict XIII		framless
Madonna degli Angeli	31 July 1729	Santa Maria in Macello Martyrum, Rome (Demolished around 1930's)	Pope Benedict XIII		
Madonna della Rotonda	22 August 1729	Sanctuary of Santa Maria della Rotonda	Pope Benedict XIII		
Maria Santissima Addolorata	1 November 1729	Palazzo dei Priori	Pope Benedict XIII		
Madonna di Loreto	17 August 1732	Church of Sant'Abbondio, Cremona	Pope Clement XII		
Madonna di Trapani	14 March 1734	Trapani	Pope Clement XII		
Madonna della Provvidenza	19 July 1734	Church of San Giuseppe dei Teatini, Palermo	Pope Clement XII		
Madonna delle Grazie	24 September 1741	Montepulciano	Pope Benedict XIV		
Madonna delle Grazie	20 May 1742	Chiesa di Sant'Agostino, Acquapendente	Pope Benedict XIV		
Madonna di Gallivaggio	24 June 1742	San Giacomo Filippo	Pope Benedict XIV		
Madonna dell'Oriente	5 September 1743	Tagliacozzo	Pope Benedict XIV		
Maria Santissima Assunta	9 May 1745	Amelia Cathedral	Pope Benedict XIV		
Madonna dei Lumi	15 May 1747	Madonna dei Lumi, San Severino Marche	Pope Benedict XIV		
Madonna della Consolazione	4 June 1747	Monticello Amiata	Pope Benedict XIV		
Madonna del Lauro	2 June 1748	Meta, Campania	Pope Benedict XIV		
Madonna della Salute	11 May 1749	San Giorgio, Macerata	Pope Benedict XIV		
Madonna della Pace	25 May 1749	Giugliano in Campania	Pope Benedict XIV		
Santa Maria Mater Domini	10 June 1749	Nocera dei Pagani	Pope Benedict XIV		
Madonna di Soviore	10 August 1749	Monterosso al Mare	Pope Benedict XIV		
Madonna delle Vertighe	14 September 1749	Monte San Savino	Pope Benedict XIV		
Madonna di San Pietro	26 September 1751	Piancastagnaio	Pope Benedict XIV		
Madonna di Custonaci	28 August 1752	Santuario di Maria Santissima di Custonaci	Pope Benedict XIV		
La Madonna Nera di Pescasseroli	8 September 1752	Pescasseroli	Pope Benedict XIV		
La Madonna del Ponte	5 May 1754	Narni	Pope Benedict XIV		
Madonna di Quintiliolo	8 June 1755	Tivoli, Lazio	Pope Benedict XIV		
Madonna della Vittoria	25 September 1757	Santa Maria della Vittoria, Scurcola Marsicana	Pope Benedict XIV		
Madonna delle Grazie	6 May 1759	Grosseto Cathedral	Pope Clement XIII		
Madonna di Gibilmanna	15 August 1760	Cefalù	Pope Clement XIII		
Maria Santissima Addolorata del Buoncammino	15 August 1761	Vasto, Naples	Pope Clement XIII		
Madonna del Popolo	8 September 1762	Monreale Cathedral	Pope Clement XIII		
Madonna del Diluvio delle Grazie	2 June 1765	Monterotondo	Pope Clement XIII		
Madonna della Prima Primaria	26 July 1765	Cappella della Prima Primaria, Collegio Romano, Rome	Pope Clement XIII		
Madonna delle Grazie di Primolo	11 August 1765	Chiesa in Valmalenco	Pope Clement XIII		
Madonna dell'Olmo	15 June 1766	Cava de' Tirreni	Pope Clement XIII		
Nostra Signora di Montallegro	7 July 1767	Rapallo	Pope Clement XIII		
Santa Maria a Mare	13 August 1769	Maiori	Pope Clement XIII (Note: Coronation formally approved through the Vatican Chapter, donating two crowns for the image on 2 August 1768 in Rome, later arriving in Maiori on August 14 of the same year. Vatican Secret Archives.)		
Madonna dell'Orto	8 September 1769	Chiavari	Pope Clement XIV		
Madonna della Madia	8 July 1770	Monopoli Cathedral	Pope Clement XIII (Note: Pontifical decree of coronation granted by the Vatican Chapter on 15 January 1769 to the descendants of Count Alessandro Sforza. Vatican Secret Archives.)		
Madonna del Popolo	8 September 1770	Verona Cathedral	Pope Clement XIV		
Madonna di Portosalvo	30 June 1771	Santa Maria di Portosalvo, Naples	Pope Clement XIV		
La Madonna delle Grazie	7 July 1771	Castel del Piano	Pope Clement XIV		
Madonna di Costantinopoli	19 September 1772	Bari Cathedral	Pope Clement XIV		
Madonna del Principio	8 January 1773	Santa Restituta, Naples	Pope Clement XIV		
Madonna del Rosario	15 August 1773	Monchiero	Pope Clement XIV		
Madonna del Rosario	26 September 1773	Basilica of the Holy Trinity, Piano di Sorrento	Pope Clement XIV		
Madonna della Rosa	25 July 1776	Santa Margherita Ligure	Pope Pius VI		
Madonna della Civita	20 July 1777 20 July 1877	Itri	Pope Pius VI Pope Pius IX		
Madonna dell'Abbondanza	29 July 1778	Marzano di Nola	Pope Pius VI		
La Madonna del Soccorso	20 September 1778	Cori, Lazio	Pope Pius VI		
Madonna di Col de' Venti	8 October 1778	Muccia	Pope Pius VI		
Madonna delle Grazie	c. 1779	Santa Maria delle Grazie, Scandriglia	Pope Pius VI		
Madonna del Giubino	5 Maggio 1779	Calatafimi-Segesta	Pope Pius VI		
La Madonna delle Grazie	24 May 1779	Ferrara Cathedral	Pope Pius VI		
Maria Santissima Assunta	7 September 1779	Caccamo	Pope Pius VI		
Maria Santissima Incoronata di Costantinopoli	10 October 1779	Gragnano	Pope Pius VI		
Immacolata Concezione	28 May 1780	Acquapendente Cathedral	Pope Pius VI		
La Madonna dei Cappuccini	3 September 1780	Santuario della Madonna dei Cappuccini, Casalpusterlengo	Pope Pius VI		
Madonna di Costantinopoli	4 September 1781	Acquaviva delle Fonti Cathedral	Pope Pius VI		
La Madonna dei Sette Veli "Madonna Iconavetere"	24 May 1782 22 May 1982	Foggia Cathedral	Pope Pius VI Pope John Paul II		
La Madonna del Popolo	3 June 1782	Cesena Cathedral	Pope Pius VI		
Madonna della Fontenuova	25 August 1782	Santuario di Maria Santissima della Fontenuova	Pope Pius VI		
Madonna di Positano	15 August 1783	Positano	Pope Pius VI		
Madonna dei Miracoli	21 June 1784	Sanctuary of Madonna dei Miracoli, Alcamo	Pope Pius VI		
Madonna del Presepio	29 October 1784	Oratorio del Convento di Sant'Antonio di Padova, Palermo	Pope Pius VI		
Madonna di Portosalvo	c. 1785	Scoglitti	Pope Pius VI		
La Madonna della Misericordia	8 September 1785	Church of Saint Peter the Apostle, Iesi	Pope Pius VI		
La Madonna di Loreto	29 July 1787	Forio	Pope Pius VI		
La Madonna delle Galline	15 August 1787	Santuario della Madonna delle Galline	Pope Pius VI		
La Madonna delle Grazie	8 June 1788	Vallo della Lucania	Pope Pius VI		
Madonna di Belmonte	17 August 1788	Sacro Monte di Belmonte, Turin	Pope Pius VI		
Madonna dei Miracoli	14 September 1790	Santuario di Nostra Signora dei Miracoli, Cicagna	Pope Pius VI		
Madonna del Rifugio	6 September 1793	Sinalunga	Pope Pius VI		
La Madonna della Misericordia	16 September 1793	San Benedetto in Piscinula, Rome	Pope Pius VI		
Madonna di Costantinopoli	25 August 1794	Ischia	Pope Pius VI		
Madonna della Visitazione	c. 1795	Enna	Pope Pius VI		
La Madonna delle Grazie	20 May 1795	Capriglia	Pope Pius VI		
Madonna di Mezzogiorno	c. 1797	Catanzaro	Pope Pius VI		
Madonna dei Miracoli	24 September 1797	San Tommaso, Lucca	Pope Pius VI		
Madonna del Soccorso	16 September 1798	Castellammare del Golfo	Pope Pius VI		
Madonna di Spoleto	30 June 1800	Spoleto Cathedral	Pope Pius VII		

== 19th century ==
Official title of the image	Date of coronation	Place of devotion	Authorization by	Marian image	Shrine of devotion
Madonna di Casaluce	13 September 1801	Casaluce	Pope Pius VII		
Madonna di Piedigrotta	5 September 1802	Santa Maria di Piedigrotta	Pope Pius VII		
Madonna delle Grazie	26 September 1802	San Pietro Martire, Naples	Pope Pius VII		
Madonna del Paradiso	10 July 1803	Mazara del Vallo	Pope Pius VII		
Madonna della Lobra	12 August 1804	Massa Lubrense	Pope Pius VII		
La Madonna della Purita	1 September 1804	The Pontifical Basilica of Saint Alphonse de Ligouri, Pagani	Pope Pius VII		
Madonna di Lucera	15 August 1806	Lucera Cathedral	Pope Pius VII		
Madonna del Monte	1 May 1814	Abbey of St Maria del Monte	Pope Pius VII		
Maria, Regina di Tutti i Santi	13 May 1814	Ancona Cathedral	Pope Pius VII		
Madonna della Misericordia	17 May 1814	Treia Cathedral	Pope Pius VII		
Madonna della Tempesta	17 May 1814	Santa Maria della Tempesta, Tolentino	Pope Pius VII		
Madonna del Conforto	15 August 1814	Arezzo Cathedral	Pope Pius VII		
Madonna della Misericordia	10 May 1815 19 April 1915	Savona	Pope Pius VII (Note: On the occasion of imprisonment of the Pontiff by Lord Napoleon Bonaparte.) Pope Benedict XV (Note: Pontifical decree of coronation titled Decesorem Nostrum granted to Archbishop of Savona Giuseppe Salvatore Scatti on the occasion of improving a new crown to be imposed to the image for its 100th year anniversary. Furthermore, the decree states that the authorizing act of coronation as a Papal legate was specially assigned to the Archbishop of Milan, Andrea Carlo Ferrari. Vatican Secret Archives.)		
Madonna della Salute	c. 1818	Castelvetrano	Pope Pius VII		
Maria Santissima delle Vittorie	c. 1818	Piazza Armerina Cathedral	Pope Pius VII		
Madonna del Boschetto	30 August 1818	Camogli	Pope Pius VII		
Madonna della Rovere	8 September 1821	San Bartolomeo al Mare	Pope Pius VII		
La Madonna delle Rocche	10 August 1823	Molare	Pope Pius VII		
Madonna del Sangue	5 August 1824	Santuario della Madonna del Sangue	Pope Pius VII		
Madonna del Suffragio	8 September 1824	Recco	Pope Pius VII (Note: Pope Pius VII authorized the coronation through the Vatican Chapter on 24 March 1823, later donating two crowns with which the Archbishop of Genoa, Luigi Lambruschini, crowned the statue of the Madonna and Child. Vatican Secret Archives.)		
Madonna del Soccorso	27 August 1826	Castelfranci	Pope Leo XII		
Immacolata di Don Placido	30 December 1826	Basilica of Gesù Vecchio, Naples	Pope Leo XII		
La Madonna delle Grazie di Artena	17 May 1828	Artena	Pope Leo XII (Note: Papal bull signed and granted to the Bishop of Segni, Pietro Antonio Luciani on 10 April 1828. Vatican Secret Archives.)		
Madonna delle Vedute	20 May 1830	Fucecchio	Pope Pius VIII		
Madonna del Ponte di Lanciano	15 September 1833	Lanciano Cathedral	Pope Gregory XVI		
La Madonna del Pilerio	12 June 1836	Cathedral of Cosenza	Pope Gregory XVI		
Madonna delle Carceri	14 August 1836	Santa Maria delle Carceri, Prato	Pope Gregory XVI		
Madonna della Croce	18 September 1837	Santa Maria della Croce, Crema	Pope Gregory XVI		
Salus Populi Romani	15 August 1838 1 November 1954	Santa Maria Maggiore, Rome	Pope Gregory XVI Pope Pius XII (Note: Pontifical decree of coronation titled Ad Cæli Reginam with the personal imposition of two golden diadems and the formal institution of the 'Feast of Queenship of Mary' signed and dated on 11 October 1954. Vatican Secret Archives.)		
Madonna di Pietraquaria	16 September 1838	Santuario della Madonna di Pietraquaria	Pope Gregory XVI		
Madonna della Fiducia	14 October 1838	Archbasilica of Saint John Lateran, Rome	Pope Gregory XVI		
Madonna di Farfa	8 September 1840	Farfa Abbey	Pope Gregory XVI		
Madonna della Salve	28 May 1843	Alessandria Cathedral	Pope Gregory XVI (Note: Coronation petitioned on the year 1837, formally authorized by decree of 1842 issued by the vatican.)		
La Madonna della Bruna	2 July 1843	Matera	Pope Gregory XVI (Note: Petition for the coronation formally decreed and granted on 14 August 1842 in which the ceremony later took place a year later in 1843, with which the Madonna and Child are adorned with two silver crowns. Vatican Secret Archives.)		
Madonna del Pianto	10 September 1843	Fermo	Pope Gregory XVI		
Madonna di Lampedusa	8 September 1845	Castellaro	Pope Gregory XVI		
Madonna dell'Oliveto	8 September 1846	Chiusavecchia	Pope Gregory XVI		
Madonna di Sotto gli Organi	14 August 1847	Pisa Cathedral	Pope Pius IX		
Madonna della Misericordia	15 August 1850	Santa Chiara, Rimini	Pope Pius IX		
Madonna del Parto	2 July 1851	Sant'Agostino, Rome	Pope Pius IX		
La Madonna delle Grazie	17 August 1851	Santa Maria Maggiore, Tivoli, Lazio	Pope Pius IX		
Madonna della Speranza	8 September 1851	Santa Maria Nova, Toffia	Pope Pius IX		
Madonna della Pace	1 May 1852	Albisola Superiore	Pope Pius IX		
Madonna del Pozzo	20 May 1852	Capurso	Pope Pius IX		
Maria Santisima Anunziata di Firenze	8 September 1852	Santissima Annunziata, Florence	Pope Pius IX		
Immacolata Concezione	8 December 1854 (First Crown) 8 December 1904 (Second stellar crown)	Chapel of the Holy Choir, Saint Peter's Basilica	Pope Pius IX Pope Pius X (Note: Pontifical decree signed and granted on 8 September 1903 by Pope Pius X, signed and notarized by Cardinal Mariano Rampolla and Cardinal Giuseppe Calasanzio. Vatican Secret Archives.)		
Madonna delle Grazie di Perugia	8 September 1855	Perugia Cathedral	Pope Pius IX		
Madonna Miracolosa di Taggia	1 June 1856	Basilica dei Santi Giacomo e Filippo, Taggia	Pope Pius IX		
Madonna del Molino	8 September 1856	Basilica of Lugo, Ravenna	Pope Pius IX		
Madonna dei Miracoli	26 April 1857	Andria	Pope Pius IX		
Madonna della Salute	6 May 1857	Sant'Eufemia, Verona	Pope Pius IX		
Beata Vergine di San Luca	10 June 1857	Madonna di San Luca, Bologna	Pope Pius IX		
Madonna di Sacro Monte di Varallo La Madonna Dormiente	20 August 1857	Sacro Monte di Varallo	Pope Pius IX		
La Madonna delle Grazie	13 June 1859	Santa Maria delle Grazie, Foce di Amelia	Pope Pius IX		
Madonna della Navicella	27 September 1859	Basilica minore di San Giacomo Apostolo, Chioggia	Pope Pius IX		
Madonna del Ponte	15 August 1861	Santuario della Madonna del Ponte, Partinico	Pope Pius IX		
Madonna della Rosa	18 September 1862	Santa Maria della Rosa, Lucca	Pope Pius IX		
Madonna di Barbana	15 August 1863	Barbana, Italy	Pope Pius IX		
Madonna del Rosario di Piansano	4 October 1863	Piansano	Pope Pius IX		
Madonna della Apparizione	11 October 1863	Pellestrina	Pope Pius IX		
Maria Santissima Consolatrice degli Afflitti	8 March 1865	Santa Maria del Suffragio, Rome	Pope Pius IX		
Madre del Perpetuo Soccorso	23 June 1867	Sant'Alfonso di Liguori, Rome	Pope Pius IX (Note: Pontifical decree of coronation granted 5 May 1866 to the Latin Patriarch of Constantinople, Cardinal Ruggero Luigi Emidio Antici Mattei. Vatican Secret Archives.)		
Madonna del Sole	24 May 1868	San Martino, Pietrasanta	Pope Pius IX		
Madonna del Boden	8 September 1868	Ornavasso	Pope Pius IX		
Madonna di Mondovi	15 August 1869	Sanctuary of Vicoforte	Pope Pius IX		
Nostra Signora di Bonaria	24 April 1870	Cagliari	Pope Pius IX		
Madonna di Tufo	11 September 1870	Rocca di Papa	Pope Pius IX		
Madonna delle Grazie	6 November 1870	Udine	Pope Pius IX		
Madonna del Rosario	22 October 1871 23 October 1921	Strambino	Pope Pius IX (Note: The 3rd coronation for the Marian image was granted through the Vatican Chapter. It was first ceremoniously crowned in 1621.) Pope Benedict XV (Note: Pope Benedict XV issued the pontifical decree titled "Dilecte Fili Noster" for the 4th coronation of the Marian image, dated on 28 September 1921 to the Most Reverend Matteo Angelo Filipello, Bishop of Ivrea. Vatican Secret Archives.)		
Madonna dell'Ospedale	19 April 1872	Luco dei Marsi	Pope Pius IX		
La Madonna delle Grazie di Ardesio	24 June 1872	Ardesio	Pope Pius IX		
Madonna di Pozzano	2 July 1874	Basilica of Pozzano, Castellammare di Stabia	Pope Pius IX		
Madonna dell'Arco	8 September 1874	Santuario della Madonna dell'Arco, Sant'Anastasia	Pope Pius IX		
Madonna del Carmine	11 July 1875	Santa Maria del Carmine, Naples	Pope Pius IX		
Madonna di Pugliano	13 August 1875	Basilica of Santa Maria a Pugliano	Pope Pius IX		
Madonna della Vittoria	15 August 1875	Santissimo Salvatore, Bologna	Pope Pius IX (Note: Pontifical decree of coronation granted on 16 July 1875 by Pope Pius IX as a "special mandate" (De Speciali Mandatum Sanctissimi) or Motu Proprio, both signed and notarized by the Prefect of the Sacred Congregation of Indulgences, Cardinal Fabio Maria Asquini. Vatican Secret Archives.)		
Madonna di Valleverde	29 August 1876	Bovino	Pope Pius IX		
La Madonna della Misericordia	8 September 1876	Santuario di Santa Maria dell'Eremita, Mallare	Pope Pius IX		
Madonna di Romania	9 September 1877	Cathedral of Tropea	Pope Pius IX		
Madonna della Salute di Solarolo	18 May 1879	Solarolo	Pope Leo XIII		
Madonna del Carmine	11 July 1880	Sorrento	Pope Leo XIII		
Madonna delle Grazie di Boccadirio	15 August 1880	Castiglione dei Pepoli	Pope Leo XIII		
Madonna della Creta	12 September 1880	Castellazzo Bormida	Pope Leo XIII		
Madonna delle Grazie	28 May 1881	Nettuno	Pope Leo XIII		
Maria Santissima Addolorata di Santa Brigida	1 June 1881	Santa Brigida, Naples	Pope Leo XIII		
Madonna di Polsi	30 August 1881	Territorial Abbey and Sanctuary of Santa Maria di Polsi	Pope Leo XIII		
Madonna del Tindari	7 September 1881	Patti, Sicily	Pope Leo XIII		
Madonna di Rosa	8 September 1881	San Vito al Tagliamento	Pope Leo XIII		
Madonna di Galatea	25 September 1881	Piano di Sorrento	Pope Leo XIII		
Madonna del Divino Amore	13 May 1883	Santuario della Madonna del Divino Amore, Rome	Pope Leo XIII		
La Madonna del Carmine	16 July 1883	Santuario della Madonna del Carmine, Catania	Pope Leo XIII		
Madonna della Stella	7 December 1884	Santa Maria della Stella, Naples	Pope Leo XIII		
Maria Santissima della Libera	15 November 1885	Santa Maria Donnaregina Nuova, Naples	Pope Leo XIII		
Madonna della Carità	14 June 1886	Moschiano	Pope Leo XIII		
Madonna delle Grazie	15 August 1886	Strongoli	Pope Leo XIII		
Madonna del Carpinello	22 August 1886	Visciano	Pope Leo XIII		
Madonna delle Grazie	1 September 1886	Santa Maria delle Grazie, Brescia	Pope Leo XIII		
Madonna della Misericordia	12 September 1886	Castelleone	Pope Leo XIII		
Madonna della Divina Provvidenza	13 November 1887	Santa Maria di Caravaggio, Naples	Pope Leo XIII		
Maria Santissima Addolorata, Liberatrice dal Colera	29 April 1888	Chiesa di San Giovanni Battista, Foggia	Pope Leo XIII		
Madonna di Materdomini	20 August 1888	Laterza	Pope Leo XIII		
Madonna delle Grazie detta di Rosella	10 June 1888	Piano di Sorrento	Pope Leo XIII		
Madonna della Pazienza	8 September 1888	Naples	Pope Leo XIII		
Madonna del Transito di Canoscio	16 September 1888	Canoscio	Pope Leo XIII		
Maria, Madre della Divina Provvidenza	11 November 1888	San Carlo ai Catinari, Rome	Pope Leo XIII		
Madonna di San Marco	17 July 1889	Bedonia	Pope Leo XIII		
Madonna del Sacro Monte di Novi Velia	15 August 1889	Novi Velia	Pope Leo XIII		
Madonna della Misericordia	29 June 1890	Poggio Mirteto	Pope Leo XIII		
Nostra Signora dell'Acquasanta	27 July 1890	Santuario di Nostra Signora dell'Acquasanta, Genova	Pope Leo XIII		
Madonna delle Querce	15 August 1890	Montepulciano	Pope Leo XIII		
Madonna di Parete	19 April 1891	Liveri	Pope Leo XIII		
Madonna del Carmine	16 July 1891	Bagnara Calabra	Pope Leo XIII		
Madonna del Miracolo	17 January 1892	Sant'Andrea delle Fratte, Rome	Pope Leo XIII		
Madonna dell'Orto	21 August 1892	Castellammare di Stabia	Pope Leo XIII		
Madonna del Sacro Monte di Viggiano	4 September 1892	Viggiano	Pope Leo XIII		
Madonna delle Grazie	8 September 1892	Crema, Lombardy	Pope Leo XIII		
Madonna di Capocolonna	7 May 1893	Sanctuary of Capo Colonna	Pope Leo XIII		
Madonna del Deserto	14 May 1893	Millesimo	Pope Leo XIII		
Madonna della Neve	5 August 1893	Cuglieri	Pope Leo XIII		
Madonna della Guardia	23 June 1894	Shrine of Nostra Signora della Guardia	Pope Leo XIII		
Madonna di Piné	11 August 1895	Montagnaga	Pope Leo XIII		
Madonna dell'Aiuto	23 June 1895	Santa Maria di Piazza, Busto Arsizio	Pope Leo XIII		
Madonna della Pietà	29 September 1895	Badia di Camaiore	Pope Leo XIII		
Cuore Immacolata di Maria	c. 1896	Santa Maria della Luce, Rome	Pope Leo XIII		
Madonna della Quercia di Viterbo	17 May 1896	Basilica di Santa Maria della Quercia, Viterbo	Pope Leo XIII		
Santa Maria ad Rupes	17 May 1896	Santa Maria in Castello, Tarquinia, Lazio	Pope Leo XIII		
Madonna del Giglio	15 August 1896	Santuario di Santa Maria del Giglio, Sambuca Pistoiese	Pope Leo XIII		
Maria Santissima Addolorata	29 August 1896	Chiesa dell'Addolorata, Offida	Pope Leo XIII		
Madonna dei Campi	5 September 1896	Stezzano	Pope Leo XIII		
Madonna del Carmine di Palmi	16 November 1896	Palmi, Calabria	Pope Leo XIII		
Madonna di Porto Salvo	8 August 1897	Castellammare di Stabia	Pope Leo XIII		
La Madonna Granda	15 August 1897	Treviso	Pope Leo XIII		
Madonna dei Miracoli	30 September 1897	Chiesa di Santa Maria dei Miracoli di Pianetto, Galeata	Pope Leo XIII		
Madonna del Buon Gesù	8 September 1898	Fabriano	Pope Leo XIII		
Maria Santissima Addolorata	9 October 1898	Cathedral of Caserta	Pope Leo XIII		
Madonna di Valverde	23 April 1899	Rezzato	Pope Leo XIII		
Madonna dei Miracoli	11 June 1899	Casalbordino	Pope Leo XIII		
Madonna della Salute	20 August 1899	Valentano	Pope Leo XIII		
La Madonna delle Grazie	3 September 1899	Pinerolo	Pope Leo XIII		
Madonna dell'Altomare	3 September 1899	Andria	Pope Leo XIII		
Madonna della Corona	17 September 1899	Spiazzi, Verona	Pope Leo XIII		
La Madonna Greca	21 April 1900	Santa Maria in Porto Basilica, Ravenna	Pope Leo XIII		
Madonna del Pasco	15 August 1900	Villanova Mondovì	Pope Leo XIII		
Madonna di Monte Berico	25 August 1900	Vicenza	Pope Leo XIII		
Maria Santissima della Neve del Monte Sirino	16 September 1900 20 September 2000	Lagonegro	Pope Leo XIII Pope John Paul II		

== 20th century ==
Official title of the image	Date of coronation	Place of devotion	Authorization by	Marian image	Shrine of devotion
La Madonna di Anglona	19 May 1901	Anglona	Pope Leo XIII		
Madonna di Belvedere	1 September 1901	Sampierdarena, Genoa	Pope Leo XIII		
Madonna della Libera	8 September 1901	Alatri	Pope Leo XIII		
Madonna di Roverano	8 September 1901	Santuario Madonna di Roverano, L'Ago, Borghetto di Vara	Pope Leo XIII		
Madonna delle Grazie della Mentorella	29 September 1901	Capranica, Lazio	Pope Leo XIII		
Madonna del Sacro Cuore	24 November 1901	Santa Maria Maggiore, Bologna	Pope Leo XIII		
Madonna delle Grazie	8 June 1902	Megli, Recco	Pope Leo XIII		
Madonna di Loreto	8 September 1902	Arpino	Pope Leo XIII		
Madonna del Colle	15 September 1902	Lenola, Lazio	Pope Leo XIII		
Mary Help of Christians	17 May 1903	Basilica of Our Lady Help of Christians, Turin	Pope Leo XIII (Note: Pontifical decree granted on 13 February 1903, signed and notarized by Cardinal Luigi Macchi and was executed publicly by Cardinal Agostino Richelmy on May 17 of the same year. Vatican Secret Archives.)		
Madonna dell'Udienza	17 May 1903	Sambuca di Sicilia	Pope Leo XIII		
Maria Santissima Addolorata	15 August 1903	Sanctuary of Our Lady of Sorrows, Postua	Pope Leo XIII		
Maria Santissima Addolorata	17 August 1903	Bergamo	Pope Leo XIII		
Madonna di Pettoruto	6 September 1903	San Sosti	Pope Leo XIII		
Maria Bambina	31 May 1904	Milan	Pope Pius X		
Madonna del Monte	5 June 1904	Chiesa di Santa Maria Maggiore, Campobasso	Pope Leo XIII		
Madonna Consolata	18 June 1904	Santuario della Consolata, Turin	Pope Pius X (Note: Pontifical decree granted to the Prefect of the Sacred Congregation of the Index, Cardinal Vincenzo Vannutelli and golden crowns donated by former Queen of Italy, Margherita of Savoy. Sacred Congregation of Rites.)		
Madonna dell'Albero	24 June 1904	Milan Cathedral	Pope Pius X		
Madonna della Sassola	14 August 1904	Campogalliano	Pope Pius X		
Madonna Avvocata del Popolo	1 September 1904	Cathedral Basilica of Saints Peter and Paul, Sessa Aurunca	Pope Pius X		
Madonna delle Grazie di Valle	8 September 1904	Gavi, Piedmont	Pope Pius X		
Madonna di Montecastello	8 September 1904	Tignale	Pope Leo XIII (Note: Coronation formally decreed and authorized through the Vatican Chapter on 25 April 1903.)		
Immaculate Conception	15 September 1904	Chiesa di San Gennaro Vescovo e Martire, Ottaviano	Pope Pius X		
The Blessed Virgin Mary of Immaculate Conception	8 December 1904	Cloister of Oblates of the Holy Spirit, Lucca, Tuscany	Pope Pius X (Note: Pontifical decree granted to Reverend Mother Superior Elena Guerra to impose a diadem of stars towards their venerated image of "Blessed Virgin of the Immaculate Conception" for the "50th Anniversary of Marian Jubilee of 1904" enshrined within their cloister. — Signed and executed by Cardinal Casimiro Gennari, notarized by the Secretary of the Sacred Congregation of Rites, Monsigneur Archbishop Diomede Panici. — Vatican Secret Archives.)		
Immaculate Conception of the Capuchins	1 June 1905	Santa Maria della Concezione dei Cappuccini, Rome	Pope Pius X		
La Madonna di Loreto di Oregina	1 June 1905	Oregina, Genoa	Pope Pius X		
Madonna dei Poveri	15 August 1905	Seminara	Pope Pius X		
Madonna delle Grazie	10 September 1905	Chiesa di Sant'Andrea Apostolo, Gallicano nel Lazio	Pope Pius X		
Madonna Lacrimosa (Pieta)	15 September 1905	Novi Ligure	Pope Pius X		
Madonna di Gerusalemme	17 April 1906	Bellona, Campania	Pope Pius X		
Madonna della Strada	2 June 1906	San Lorenzo Maggiore	Pope Pius X		
La Madonna delle Vergini	3 July 1906	Scafati	Pope Pius X		
Madonna delle Grazie (Pieta)	2 September 1906	Orta San Giulio	Pope Pius X		
Madonna delle Grazie	3 September 1906	Chieri Cathedral	Pope Pius X		
Madonna del Pilastrello	19 September 1906	Sanctuary of the Madonna del Pilastrello, Lendinara	Pope Pius X		
Madonna della Consolazione	1 October 1906	San Valentino Torio	Pope Pius X		
La Madonna del Castello	4 August 1907	Formicola	Pope Pius X		
La Madonna del Soccorso	15 August 1907	Sciacca	Pope Pius X		
Madonna del Suffragio	13 September 1907	Monte San Giovanni Campano	Pope Pius X		
Madonna dei Bagni	5 July 1908	Scafati	Pope Pius X		
Maria Santissima Preziosa	8 September 1908	Casal di Principe	Pope Pius X		
Madonna della Cornabusa (Pieta)	4 October 1908	Costa Valle Imagna	Pope Leo XIII (Note: Coronation formally petitioned and requested on 24 June 1900 by the Bishop of Bergamo, Giacomo Maria Radini Tedeschi which would later get a positive response by a decree dated 29 March 1901, formally authorizing the coronation of the Sorrowful Madonna. Vatican Secret Archives.)		
Immaculate Conception	24 January 1909	Church of Saint Francis of Assisi, Albaro	Pope Pius X		
Madonna delle Grazie	9 May 1909	Sassari	Pope Pius X		
Madonna della Porta	22 May 1909	Sanctuary of the Blessed Virgin of the Gate, Guastalla	Pope Pius X		
Madonna of Constantinople	23 May 1909	Abbey of Santa Giustina, Padua	Pope Pius X		
Madonna dell'Orto	22 August 1909	San Pietro di Cremeno, Genoa	Pope Pius X		
Our Lady of the Angels	16 May 1910	Arcola, Liguria	Pope Pius X		
Madonna del Castello	22 May 1910	Caraglio	Pope Pius X		
Maria Santissima Addolorata al Fiumicello	4 September 1910	The Little Pontifical Sanctuary of Maria Santissima Addolorata al Fiumicello, Naples (destroyed during World War II) Church of Sant'Anna alle Paludi, Naples (present shrine)	Pope Pius X (Note: On 4 September 1910, the statue of Our Lady of Sorrows was canonically crowned by Giuseppe Cardinal Prisco, Archbishop of Naples. This event was formally recognized in the papal bull "Romani Pontifices", issued by Pope Benedict XV on 16 January 1916, which also granted the original chapel the title of "Pontifical.")		
Maria Santissima Mamma Nostra	11 September 1910	Parish of Saint John the Baptist the Beheaded, Bivongi	Pope Pius X		
Madonna della Sanità	21 April 1911	Castellammare di Stabia	Pope Pius X		
Madonna della Stella	8 September 1911	Sanctuary of Madonna della Stella, Montefalco	Pope Pius X		
Madonna del Buon Consiglio	6 January 1912	Basilica dell'Incoronata Madre del Buon Consiglio, Naples	Pope Pius X		
Madonna del Granato (Original statue destroyed due to fire in 1918.)	2 May 1912	Capaccio Vecchio	Pope Pius X		
Maria Santissima Addolorata	4 August 1912	Chiesa di San Paolo Eremita e Santissima Epifania, San Paolo Bel Sito	Pope Pius X (Note: The pontifical decree of coronation was granted by Pope Pius X on 6 June 1912. Vatican Apostolic Archive.)		
Madonna del Taburno	23 March 1913	Sanctuary of the Virgin of Taburnus, Bucciano	Pope Pius X		
Madonna di Conadomini	31 May 1913	Caltagirone	Pope Pius X		
Mother of God (Generic Title)	14 August 1913	Santa Maria a Vico	Pope Pius X		
Our Lady of Sorrows	31 August 1913	Church of Saint Peter, Poli, Lazio	Pope Pius X		
Madonna Avvocata Nostra	13 October 1913	Church of San Giacomo Maggiore, Vicovaro	Pope Pius X		
Madonna delle Neve	c. 1914	Zungri	Pope Pius X		
Madonna di Materdomini	17 March 1914	Mesagne	Pope Pius X		
La Madonna del Mirteto (Icon of the Descent of Jesus from the Cross)	21 May 1914	Ortonovo	Pope Pius X		
Madonna della Neve	2 August 1914	Ponticelli	Pope Pius X		
Madonna della Libera	8 September 1914	Moiano	Pope Pius X		
Madonna degli Angeli	12 April 1915	Cicciano	Pope Benedict XV		
Santissima Annuziata	18 April 1915	Chiesa dell'Ave Gratia Plena, Naples	Pope Benedict XV		
Santa Maria Apparve	15 August 1915	Santa Maria Apparve, Ostra, Marche	Pope Benedict XV		
Nostra Signora di Guadalupe di Albino	3 October 1915	Albino, Lombardy	Pope Benedict XV		
La Madonna del Pianto (Pieta)	12 October 1916	Albino, Lombardy	Pope Benedict XV		
Madonna del Buon Consiglio	27 April 1919	Villa di Serio	Pope Benedict XV		
Madonna di Altino	23 July 1919	Albino, Lombardy	Pope Benedict XV		
Madonna della Fonte	3 August 1919	Canosa di Puglia	Pope Benedict XV		
Maria Santissima Annunziata	17 August 1919	Rione Angri in Sant'Agnello	Pope Benedict XV		
Madonna della Pallavicina	25 August 1919	Izano	Pope Benedict XV		
Madonna del Castello	8 September 1919	Fiorano Modenese	Pope Benedict XV		
Madonna della Rotonda	5 April 1920	Parete	Pope Benedict XV		
Madonna Ausiliatrice	18 April 1920	San Giacomo degli Spagnoli, Naples	Pope Benedict XV		
Madonna della Pietà	30 April 1920	Eboli	Pope Benedict XV		
Maria Santissima Addolorata	9 May 1920	Viareggio	Pope Benedict XV		
Madonna degli Angeli e dei Martiri	27 June 1920	Santa Maria degli Angeli e dei Martiri, Rome	Pope Benedict XV		
La Madonnetta	27 June 1920	Genoa	Pope Benedict XV		
Madonna dello Zuccarello	8 August 1920	Nembro	Pope Benedict XV		
Madonna della Rupe	20 August 1920	San Martino d'Agri	Pope Benedict XV		
Madonna della Vitaleta	1 September 1920	San Quirico d'Orcia	Pope Benedict XV		
Madonna della Quercia	5 September 1920	Bettola	Pope Benedict XV		
Madonna di Finalpia	8 September 1920	Final Pia	Pope Benedict XV		
Madonna del Ponte	12 September 1920	Lavagna	Pope Benedict XV		
Madonna della Vittoria	19 September 1920	Nepi	Pope Benedict XV		
Madonna delle Vigne	21 November 1920	Basilica of Santa Maria delle Vigne, Genoa	Pope Benedict XV (Note: The image was first ceremoniously crowned without pontifical recognition on 5 April 1616 by Cardinal Orazio Spinola. The pontifical decree of coronation titled Quae Civitatis Istius was personally granted to the Archbishop of Genoa, Cardinal Tommaso Pio Boggiani as a high form of honor for the Pope's native birthplace. Vatican Secret Archives.)		
Madonna della Comuna	23 November 1920	Ostiglia	Pope Benedict XV		
Madonna del Soccorso	5 May 1921	Prato	Pope Benedict XV		
Madonna delle Grazie	31 August 1921	Minturno	Pope Benedict XV		
Madonna della Basella	8 September 1921	Urgnano	Pope Benedict XV		
Maria Santissima della Catena	11 September 1921	Dipignano	Pope Benedict XV		
Maria Santissima Addolorata	18 September 1921	Senigallia	Pope Benedict XV		
Madonna di Follina	25 September 1921	Cistercian Abbey of Santa Maria de Follina	Pope Benedict XV (Note: Pontifical decree of coronation requested by Father Anacletus Milani, granted to the Patriarch of Venice, Cardinal Pietro La Fontaine on 10 August 1921. Notarized by Cardinal Pietro Gasparri at the Vatican. Vatican Secret Archives.)		
Madonna della Salute	23 April 1922	Santa Maria della Salute, Venice	Pope Pius XI		
Madonna di Costantinopoli	6 August 1922	Salerno	Pope Leo XIII (Note: Pope Leo XIII through the Vatican Chapter, issued the decree authorizing the coronation on 15 December 1901.)		
Madonna della Colonna	20 August 1922	Cupramontana	Pope Pius XI		
Maria Santissima Addolorata del Romitello	27 August 1922	Borgetto	Pope Pius XI		
Madonna delle Neve	2 September 1922	Sorbo Serpico	Pope Pius XI (Note: Papal decree authorizing the coronation granted on 18 July 1922 to Bishop of Avelino, Giuseppe Padula. Vatican Secret Archives.)		
Madonna del Castelmonte	3 September 1922	Sanctuary of Castelmonte, Porpetto	Pope Pius XI		
Madonna Nera di Loreto (Reconstruction)	5 September 1922	Basilica della Santa Casa	Pope Pius XI		
Madonna della Libera	7 September 1922	Maiella	Pope Pius XI		
Madonna della Sanità	22 October 1922	Vallecorsa	Pope Leo XIII (Note: Pope Leo XIII authorized the coronation by papal Bull of 26 December 1891 granted to Archbishop of Gaeta, Nicola Contieri.)		
Madonna della Neve	22 October 1922	Torre Annunziata	Pope Pius XI		
Madonna del Lazzaretto	22 October 1922	Sanctuary of Masciaga, Bedizzole	Pope Pius XI		
Madonna dei Miracoli	17 May 1923	Tramutola	Pope Pius XI		
Madonna delle Grazie	27 May 1923	Santuario della Madonna delle Grazie, Voghera	Pope Pius XI		
Maria Santissima Addolorata	16 September 1923	Appignano	Pope Benedict XV (Note: Coronation authorized in 1916, and would only be carried out a few years later in 1923.)		
La Vergine Addolorata	16 September 1923	Tuscania	Pope Pius XI		
La Madonna della Consolazione detta di Ghisalba	26 April 1924	Ghisalba	Pope Pius XI		
La Madonna delle Grazie	10 August 1924	Procida	Pope Pius XI		
Madonna della Ceriola	30 August 1924	Sanctuary of Madonna della Ceriola, Monte Isola	Pope Pius XI		
Madonna delle Grazie	7 September 1924	Shrine Parish of Our Lady of Grace, Pettorazza Grimani	Pope Pius XI		
Maria Santissima Addolorata	24 September 1924	Ceva	Pope Pius XI		
Madonna delle Grazie di Este	17 May 1925	Santa Maria delle Grazie, Este	Pope Pius XI		
Madonna dell'Ambro	9 August 1925	Santuario della Madonna dell'Ambro, Montefortino	Pope Pius XI		
Nostra Signora di Guadalupe	25 October 1925	San Nicola in Carcere, Rome	Pope Pius XI (Note: Coronation formally authorized by the Vatican Chapter on 11 January 1925 and the icon was crowned on 25 October of the same year with a mass presided by Cardinal Merry del Val. Vatican Secret Archives.)		
Madonna di Canepanova	30 May 1926	Santa Maria di Canepanova, Pavia	Pope Pius XI		
Maria Santissima del Carmelo	15 July 1926	Parish Church of Our Lady of Mount Carmel, Atripalda	Pope Pius XI		
Madonna delle Cese	8 August 1926	Collepardo	Pope Pius XI		
Maria Santissima Addolorata	21 September 1926	Pignataro Interamna	Pope Pius XI		
Madonna di San Luca	21 September 1926	Bagolino	Pope Pius XI		
Madonna delle Grazie	21 October 1926	Cathedral of Rovigo	Pope Pius XI		
La Madonna del Latte Refugium Peccatorum	8 December 1926	Santa Maria Annunziata in Borgo, Rome	Pope Pius XI		
Immacolata Concezione	8 December 1926	Cittanova	Pope Pius XI		
Madonna del Carmine	21 August 1927	Accadia	Pope Pius XI		
Madonna della Provvidenza	24 August 1927 23 August 1983	Montalbano Elicona	Pope Pius XI Pope John Paul II		
Madonna dei Lumini	16 October 1927	Basilica del Carmine, Padua	Pope Pius XI (Note: The pontifical decree of coronation was granted by Pope Pius XI on 12 December 1926. Vatican Apostolic Archive.)		
Immacolata Concezione	12 August 1928	Diamante, Calabria	Pope Pius XI		
Madonna della Carbonara	8 September 1928	Giffoni Valle Piana	Pope Pius XI		
Madonna dei Miracoli di Cantù	23 September 1928	Cantù	Pope Pius XI		
La Madonna del Pozzo	26 May 1929	Church of Saint Francis of Assisi, Albaro	Pope Pius XI		
Madonna Madre dei Bambini	13 July 1929	Cigoli, San Miniato	Pope Pius XI		
Madonna d'Erbia	5 August 1929	Casnigo	Pope Pius XI		
Maria Santissima Adolorata	c. October 1929	Chiesa di San Bartolomeo, Como	Pope Pius XI (Note: The pontifical decree of coronation was granted on 11 August 1929. Vatican Apostolic Archive.)		
Madonna della Misericordia	29 May 1930	Ascoli Satriano	Pope Pius XI		
Madonna del Carmine	16 July 1930	Laurenzana	Pope Pius XI		
Madonna del Frassino	24 September 1930	Santuario della Madonna del Frassino, Peschiera del Garda	Pope Pius XI		
Madonna delle Grazie di Faenza "Madonna delle Frecce"	25 March 1931	Faenza Cathedral	Pope Pius XI (Note: The icon was first ceremoniously crowned without pontifical recognition on 18 May 1631 by Cardinal Francesco Cennini de' Salamandri. The pontifical decree of coronation was granted to the Prefect for the Congregation for Divine Worship and the Discipline of the Sacraments, Cardinal Michele Lega on 11 March 1931. Sacred Congregation of Rites.)		
Immacolata Concezione	31 May 1931	San Francesco d'Assisi, Palermo	Pope Pius XI (Note: Papal bull signed and granted on 13 June 1929 to Archbishop of Palermo, Cardinal Luigi Lavitrano. Vatican Secret Archives.)		
Madonna di Materdomini	10 August 1931	Sanctuary of San Gerardo Maiella, Materdomini, Caposele	Pope Pius XI		
Madonna di Rosa Mistica	20 September 1931	Cormons	Pope Pius XI		
Nostra Signora, Virgo Potens	19 June 1932	Genoa	Pope Pius XI		
Beata Vergine Addolorata di Campocavallo	25 September 1932	Santuario della Beata Vergine Addolorata, Osimo	Pope Pius XI		
Madonna del Carmelo	16 July 1933	Castellammare di Stabia	Pope Pius XI		
Madonna di Valverde	26 May 1935	Alghero	Pope Pius XI		
Madonna del Carmine	26 May 1935	Avigliano	Pope Pius XI		
Maria Santissima Addolorata	4 August 1935	Secondigliano	Pope Pius XI		
Madonna dei Cordici	8 September 1935	Santuario Maria SS. dei Cordici, Torraca	Pope Pius XI		
Madonna delle Grazie di Montevago	14 November 1935	Montevago	Pope Pius XI		
Madonna della Speranza	5 July 1936	Marigliano	Pope Pius XI		
Madonna della Misericordia	1 May 1937	Terni Cathedral	Pope Pius XI		
Madonna del Soccorso	8 May 1937	Apulia	Pope Pius XI		
Madonna delle Grazie	23 May 1937	Monza	Pope Pius XI		
Madonna Assunta	14 August 1937	Basilica of Santa Maria Maggiore, Santa Maria Capua Vetere	Pope Pius XI (Note: Coronation authorized through the Vatican Chapter, issuing the coronation decree on 27 April 1937. Vatican Secret Archives.)		
Madonna del Monte di Racalmuto	12 June 1938	Racalmuto	Pope Pius XI		
Madonna del Buon Consiglio	15 January 1939	Santa Maria della Sanità, Naples	Pope Pius XI		
La Madonna della Salute	10 September 1944	Parrocchia Santa Maria del Carmine e San Giuseppe, Rome	Pope Pius XII		
Madonna di Valverde	26 August 1945	Catania	Pope Pius XII		
Madonna delle Grazie	3 October 1945	Gavignano	Pope Pius XII		
Maria Santissima Immacolata	8 December 1945	Salemi	Pope Pius XII		
Madonna della Salute	12 April 1946	Basilica of Saint Peter in Goito	Pope Pius XII (Note: Pontifical decree of coronation granted by Pope Pius XII on 4 November 1945 for the Archbishop of Mantua, Domenico Menna. Vatican Secret Archives.)		
La Madonna della Pace	10 June 1946	Santi Giovanni e Paolo, Venice	Pope Pius XII		
Madonna di Santa Valeria	15 September 1946	Seregno	Pope Pius XII		
Madonna del Rosario	7 October 1946	Basilica of Saint Siro, Sanremo	Pope Pius XII (Note: Pontifical decree of coronation signed and granted on same day to the Apostolic Dataria, Cardinal Federico Tedeschini, who also executed the rite of coronation. Vatican Secret Archives.)		
Madonna dell'Archetto	1 November 1946	Madonna dell'Archetto, Rome	Pope Pius XII		
Madonna del Latte	1 November 1946	Passetto del Biscione, Rome	Pope Pius XII		
Madonna del Carmine (icon)	1 June 1947	Andria	Pope Pius XII		
Madonna delle Grazie	1 June 1947	Sanctuary of Our Lady of Grace, Piove di Sacco	Pope Pius XII		
Immacolata Concezione	16 June 1947	Bagnoli Irpino	Pope Pius XII		
Madonna del Carmine	13 July 1947	Chiesa del Carmine, Forli	Pope Pius XII		
Madonna del Popolo	26 July 1947	Gardone Val Trompia	Pope Pius XII		
Madonna del Campo	17 August 1947	Alvito, Lazio	Pope Pius XII		
Madonna del Monte Saraceno	9 September 1947	Calvello	Pope Pius XII		
Madonna del Buon Consiglio	21 September 1947	Torre del Greco	Pope Pius XII		
Maria Santissima Addolorata	20 June 1948	Trani	Pope Pius XII (Note: Papal decree granted to Archbishop of Trani, Francesco Petronelli on 16 August 1942. Vatican Secret Archives.)		
Madonna della Misericordia	15 August 1948	Bovegno	Pope Pius XII		
Madonna di Compigliano	22 August 1948	San Vito Romano	Pope Pius XII		
Madonna del Corte	4 September 1948	Nuoro	Pope Pius XII		
Madonna del Rifugio di Norma	8 September 1948	Norma, Lazio	Pope Pius XII		
Madonna della Delibera	8 September 1948	Terracina	Pope Pius XII		
Madonna di Santo Stefano	19 September 1948	Rovato	Pope Pius XII		
Maria Santissima dell'Elemosina — Madre della Misericordia	3 October 1948	Biancavilla	Pope Pius XII		
Madonna della Coltura	15 May 1949 (original icon) 15 May 2010 (statue)	Parabita	Pope Pius XII Pope Benedict XVI (Note: Pope Benedict XVI, Congregation for Divine Worship and the Discipline of the Sacraments — Protocol Number: 30/10/L, Diocese of Nardò-Gallipoli, 2 February 2010. Vatican Apostolic Archive.)		
Madonna di Ripalta	8 September 1949	Cerignola	Pope Pius XII		
Madonna di Noli Me Tollere	26 May 1950	Sorso	Pope Pius XII		
Maria Santissima Immacolata	14 June 1950	Fiumefreddo di Sicilia	Pope Pius XII		
Maria Santissima Acheropita	18 June 1950	Rossano Cathedral	Pope Pius XII		
Madonna dei Lattani, Regina Mundi	6 August 1950	Roccamonfina	Pope Pius XII (Note: Pontifical decree granted by Pope Pius XII as a "special mandate" ("De Speciali Mandatum Sanctissimi") or Motu Proprio, both signed and notarized by the Prefect of the Sacred Congregation of Rites, Cardinal Clemente Micara and redeclared on 12 May 1953 via decree titled Vitae Huius Iactati by the Grand Chancellor of Apostolic Briefs, Monsigneur Gildo Brugnola. Vatican Secret Archives.)		
Madonna della Pietà d'Appari	27 March 1951	Santuario della Madonna d'Appari, Paganica	Pope Pius XII		
Madonna dei Martiri (icon)	1 July 1951	Molfetta	Pope Pius XII		
Madonna del Carmine	16 July 1951	Curinga	Pope Pius XII		
Immacolata Concezione	19 August 1951	Bitonto Cathedral	Pope Pius XII		
Madonna della Stella	17 August 1952	Fosciandora	Pope Pius XII		
Madonna del Rimedio	7 September 1952	Oristano	Pope Pius XII		
Immacolata Concezione	12 August 1953	Basilica dell'Immacolata Concezione, Catanzaro	Pope Pius XII		
Madonna di Marciano	16 October 1953	Piana di Monte Verna	Pope Pius XII		
Beata Vergine Marcelliana	4 April 1954	Monfalcone	Pope Pius XII		
Madonna di Gulfi	6 May 1954	Chiaramonte Gulfi	Pope Pius XII		
Immacolata Concezione	23 June 1954	Torre del Greco	Pope Pius XII		
Madonna del Castello	27 June 1954	Castrovillari	Pope Pius XII		
Madonna di Montespineto	25 July 1954	Stazzano	Pope Pius XII (Note: The pontifical decree of coronation was granted by Pope Pius XII on 25 March 1954.)		
Madonna del Bosco	29 August 1954	Sanctuary of Madonna del Bosco, Imbersago	Pope Pius XII		
Nostra Signora di Luogosanto	8 September 1954	Basilica of Our Lady of Luogosanto	Pope Pius XII		
Madonna della Stella	8 September 1954	Santa Maria della Stella, Militello in Val di Catania	Pope Pius XII (Note: Decree signed and granted on 24 June 1954 to the bishop of Caltagirone, Pietro Capizzi. Vatican Secret Archives.)		
Madonna del Buoncammino	15 September 1954	Altamura	Pope Pius XII		
Madonna di Canneto	19 September 1954	Basilica Shrine of Our Lady of Canneto, Settefrati	Pope Pius XII		
Maria Santissima d'Alemanna	19 September 1954	Gela	Pope Pius XII (Note: Coronation formally decreed on 30 July 1954, via decree issued by the Vatican Chapter. The icon was crowned by Cardinal Clemente Micara. Vatican Secret Archives.)		
Immacolata Concezione	31 October 1954	Church of Saint Francis of Assisi, Mussomeli	Pope Pius XII		
Maria Santissima Immacolata	17 November 1954	Luzzi, Cosenza	Pope Pius XII (Note: The pontifical decree of coronation was granted by Pope Pius XII on 15 March 1950.)		
Beata Vergine Addolorata di Rovigo	21 November 1954	Rovigo	Pope Pius XII		
Madonna dei Miracoli	17 April 1955	Sanctuary of the Madonna of Miracles (Corbetta)	Pope Pius XII		
Madonna della Pietà	21 May 1955	Bassano Romano	Pope Pius XII		
Mary Help of Christians	2 June 1955	Rovereto	Pope Pius XII		
Madonna di Siponto	28 August 1955	Basilica of Santa Maria Maggiore di Siponto (former shrine) Manfredonia Cathedral (current shrine)	Pope Pius XII		
Madonna dell’Assunta	29 September 1956	Bonito, Campania	Pope Pius XII		
Madonna delle Grazie delle Fornaci	10 October 1956	Santa Maria delle Grazie alle Fornaci fuori Porta Cavalleggeri	Pope Pius XII		
Madonna Addolorata	21 October 1956	Alvignano	Pope Pius XII		
Madonna della Catena	14 August 1957	Santa Maria della Catena, Aci Catena	Pope Pius XII		
Madonna di Lourdes	11 February 1958	Santa Maria in Aquiro	Pope Pius XII		
Madonna delle Grazie	1 July 1958	Gela	Pope Pius XII		
Madonna delle Laste	16 July 1958	Trento	Pope Pius XII		
Maria Santissima Addolorata	15 September 1959	Miano	Pope John XXIII		
Madonna del Carmine	27 March 1960	Taurianova	Pope John XXIII		
Madonna dello Sterpeto	28 May 1961	Barletta	Pope John XXIII		
Immacolata Concezione	13 May 1962	San Francesco, Bologna	Pope John XXIII		
Madonna dell'Aiuto	1 July 1962	Santa Maria dell'Aiuto, Catania	Pope John XXIII		
Maria Santissima Incoronata di Vasto	12 May 1964	Vasto	Pope Paul VI		
Madonna del Schiavo	15 November 1964	Carloforte	Pope Paul VI		
La Madonna delle Grazie di Varoni	c. 1965	Varoni	Pope Paul VI		
Madonna di Sovereto	17 January 1965	Terlizzi	Pope Paul VI		
Madonna del Rosario di Pompei	23 April 1965	Shrine of the Virgin of the Rosary of Pompei	Pope Paul VI		
Madonna della Libera	27 June 1965	Castellammare di Stabia	Pope Paul VI		
Madonna della Neve	19 May 1966	Senigallia	Pope Paul VI		
Madonna della Libera	6 August 1966	Pietrelcina	Pope Paul VI		
Madonna Assunta	14 August 1966	Avellino Cathedral	Pope Paul VI		
Madonna di Picciano	9 October 1966	Matera	Pope Paul VI		
La Vergine Addolorata	21 November 1967	Airola	Pope Paul VI		
Nostra Signora di Gonare	28 May 1972	Shrine of Our Lady of Gonare, Sarule	Pope Pius XII (Note: The pontifical decree of coronation was granted by Pope Pius XII on 10 October 1954. The rites were scheduled for 24 August 1958, but due to some circumstances, the coronation wasn't held until 1972, during Pope Paul VI's pontificate.)		
Madonna di Bonacatu	22 May 1977	Bonarcado	Pope Paul VI		
Maria SS. del Rosario di Flocco	16 October 1977	Flocco	Pope Paul VI		
Madonna della Purita	7 May 1983	Pagani, Campania	Pope John Paul II		
Our Lady of the Rosary	31 August 1985	Soriano Calabro	Pope John Paul II		
Madonna delle Grazie	25 September 1991	Gravina in Puglia	Pope John Paul II (Note: Pope John Paul II personally crowned the image in St. Peter's Square in 1991, though only being decreed 10 years later in 2001: Congregation for Divine Worship and the Discipline of the Sacraments — Protocol Number: 2258/00/L, Diocese of Altamura-Gravina-Acquaviva delle Fonti, 7 August 2001. Vatican Apostolic Archive.)		
Santa Maria, Regina dei Popoli	14 May 1995	Santuario della Madonna del Preval, Mossa, Friuli-Venezia Giulia	Pope John Paul II		
Madonna Nicopeia	26 October 1996	Basilica Santa Maria della Vittoria, San Vito dei Normanni	Pope John Paul II		
Madonna della Libera	Decreed on 5 September 2000	Carano di Sessa Aurunca	Pope John Paul II (Note: Pope John Paul II, Congregation for Divine Worship and the Discipline of the Sacraments — Protocol Number: 1586/00/L, Diocese of Sessa Aurunca, 5 September 2000. Vatican Apostolic Archive.)		

== 21st century ==
Official title of the image	Date of coronation	Place of devotion	Authorization by	Marian image	Shrine of devotion
Madonna Avvocata	3 April 2002	Sanctuary of Monte Falerzio	Pope John Paul II (Note: Pope John Paul II, Congregation for Divine Worship and the Discipline of the Sacraments — Protocol Number: 1391/02/L, Diocese of Cava de' Tirreni, 14 October 2002. Vatican Apostolic Archive.)		
Madonna di Guadalupe	12 December 2002	Casa Generalizia delle Clarisse Missionarie del Santissimo Sacramento, Salita di Castel Giubileo, Rome	Pope John Paul II (Note: Pope John Paul II, Congregation for Divine Worship and the Discipline of the Sacraments — Protocol Number: 2040/02/L, Diocese of Rome, 27 November 2002. Vatican Apostolic Archive.)		
Madonna di Lourdes	Decreed on 20 May 2003	Guidonia Montecelio	Pope John Paul II (Note: Pope John Paul II, Congregation for Divine Worship and the Discipline of the Sacraments — Protocol Number: 973/03/L, Diocese of Tivoli, 20 May 2003. Vatican Apostolic Archive.)		
Madonna di Constantinopoli	23 May 2010	Cellole	Pope Benedict XVI (Note: Pope Benedict XVI, Congregation for Divine Worship and the Discipline of the Sacraments — Protocol Number: 135/10/L, Diocese of Sessa Aurunca, 23 March 2010. Vatican Apostolic Archive.)		
Madonna della Consolazione	11 September 2010	Casalbuono	Pope Benedict XVI (Note: Pope Benedict XVI, Congregation for Divine Worship and the Discipline of the Sacraments — Protocol Number: 658/10/L, Diocese of Teggiano-Policastro, 28 August 2010. Vatican Apostolic Archive.)		
Maria Santissima Addolorata	15 September 2015	Montella	Pope Francis (Note: Pope Francis, Congregation for Divine Worship and the Discipline of the Sacraments — Protocol Number: 182/15, Archdiocese of Sant'Angelo dei Lombardi–Conza–Nusco–Bisaccia, 18 May 2015. Vatican Apostolic Archive.)		
La Madonna, Regina di Bancali	11 June 2016	Bancali, Sassari	Pope Francis (Note: Pope Francis, Congregation for Divine Worship and the Discipline of the Sacraments — Protocol Number: 260/16, Archdiocese of Sassari, 4 June 2016. Vatican Apostolic Archive.)		
La Madonna Nera di Oropa	29 August 2021	Sanctuary of Oropa, Biella	Pope Francis (Note: The statue was first ceremoniously crowned without pontifical recognition on 30 August 1620 by Bishop Giacomo Goria and Reverend Francesco Sforza Pallavicino. The pontifical decree of coronation titled "Major Aurora Resplendet" was granted to Dean of the College of Cardinals, Giovanni Battista Re on 5 August 2021. Vatican Apostolic Archive.)		
La Madonna del Soccorso dei Miracoli	24 April 2026	Church of Saint Augustine, Caltabellotta	Pope Leo XIV (Note: Pope Leo XIV, Dicastery for Divine Worship and the Discipline of the Sacraments — Protocol Number: 131/26, Archdiocese of Agrigento, 19 March 2026. Vatican Apostolic Archive.)		
