= Santa Maria della Catena =

Santa Maria della Catena may refer to:

- Santa Maria della Catena, Aci Catena
- Santa Maria della Catena, Naples
- Santa Maria della Catena, Palermo
