= Sanctuary of Madonna del Ponte =

Sanctuary in Partinico, Sicily

Santuario della Madonna del Ponte
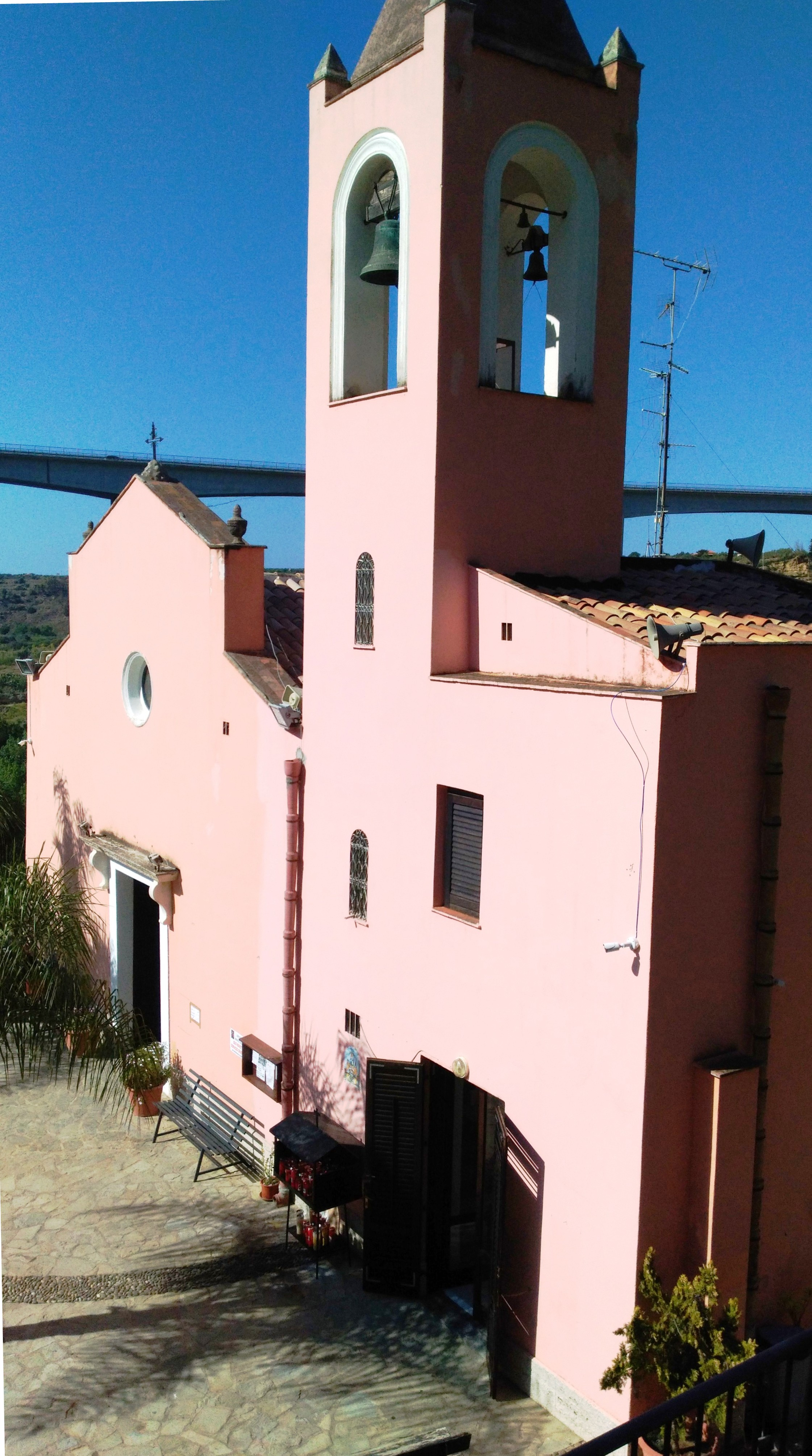
- The façade

Religion
- Affiliation: Roman Catholic
- Province: province of Palermo
- Region: Sicily
- Patron: the Most Holy Mary of the Bridge

Location
- Location: Partinico, province of Palermo, Italy
- Municipality: Partinico
- State: Italy
- Interactive map of Santuario della Madonna del Ponte
- Territory: Partinico
- Coordinates: 38°02′22″N 13°02′05″E

Architecture
- Groundbreaking: 15th century

The sanctuary of Madonna del Ponte is located on the SP 63 (provinciale road 63), in the territory of Partinico (Palermo), 3 or 4 km from the junction of Balestrate of the A29 motorway.

== History ==
In 1306, king Frederick III of Sicily, devoted to Maria Santissima Annunziata and in order to thank her for the graces he had received, donated the lands near Altofonte to the Cistercian Order, because he wanted an abbey to be built in order to enhance the cult for the Virgin Mary. Three years later, the king saw the merits of these friars and gave also the lands in the park of Partinico (that in the previous years had been devastated by Saracens. So it was up to these abbots to provide for the rebuilding of this small town, but they started works only at about 1430 A.D.

They gave Partinico the coat of arms and tried to repopulate it; a group of friars settled in the wood in order to administer the assets they had received and give a civil and religious education to the new settlers.

The abbot Pietro Guzio started the restoration works of a small church in order to let Federico II to attend mass when he was hunting in that area. In 1774, Frederick III of Sicily gave his financial support to the restoration of the sanctuary: it was enlarged with three naves, and the vaults supported by four stucco columns.

In order to satisfy the wish of all the community of Partinico, grateful towards the Virgin who had saved the town from cholera in 1854, they made the request for the coronation of the holy Image: it took place in 1861, and there were five days of celebrations on that occasion.

In 2000, with the Great Jubilee, the sanctuary was chosen as a place of pilgrimage to get indulgences, and in 2010 it was associated to the Basilica of Santa Maria Maggiore in Rome.

== The painting ==
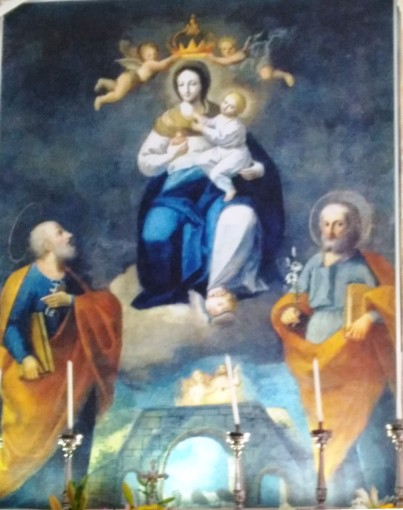
The painting of the Virgin Mary, realized by Vincenzo Manno in 1819

The first image was a copy (painted or sculpted) of that one venerated at Altofonte and still existing there; later it got ruined as time passed by. In 1669, the bishop of Mazara del Vallo gave the permit to build an altar in the Mother Church of Partinico with the image of Maria Santissima del Ponte.

In 1795, as humidity had ruined the painting, they had another copy made by the painter Domenico Ferrandina: it was used the old canvas already consumed. The present painting was realized by Vincenzo Manno in 1819, and has been restored several times.

Our Lady is represented on the throne: with an arm she is holding the Christ Child, who is stretching out his hands towards her, while her right hand is holding a heart; on the two sides there are Saint Peter, with a book and keys in his hands, and Paul the Apostle (or saint John the Apostle) with a book and a lily. Below them we can see a bridge, which recalls the old one on the river Jato that is near this place.

== The feast ==
It takes place in the week following Easter from Thursday to Saturday; thousands of devotees go on a pilgrimage to the sanctuary with torches lit. At the same time, some folkloristic events take place.

On the day of the feast (Sunday) at 12 o’clock sharp, the painting is put on a vara and starts towards Partinico: in the evening, when it arrives, is received by the civil authorities, the clergy and the townspeople; then it goes round the streets of the small town. At about midnight the procession arrives at the Mother Church, where the painting will remain and people go there to pray the Holy Virgin; in August there will be three days’ celebrations, with folkloristic events, and in November it will be taken back to the sanctuary.

People from Partinico, Balestrate, Trappeto and Alcamo take part in this feast; according to tradition, if the painting goes out from the small Church at 12 o’clock, i twill belong to the people of Partinico, if it is late (until 12,30), it will belong to the people of Alcamo, and if it goes out from 12,30 to 13,00 it will belong to Balestrate, and finally to Trappeto.

In fact, according to Giuseppe Pitrè, the legend says that there were four people from the neighbour towns to competing for the property of The Madonna, miraculously found in a grotto; as the chart carrying the statue was not moving towards any of the four towns, they decided to build a small Church there in order to venerate it all together.

== See also ==
- Sanctuary of Most Holy Mary of the Height
- Santuario di Maria Santissima di Custonaci
- Partinico
- Alcamo
- Balestrate
- Trappeto
