= Santa Maria dell'Aiuto, Catania =

Church in Catania, Sicily, Italy

Santa Maria dell'Aiuto
- Chiesa di Santa Maria dell'Aiuto
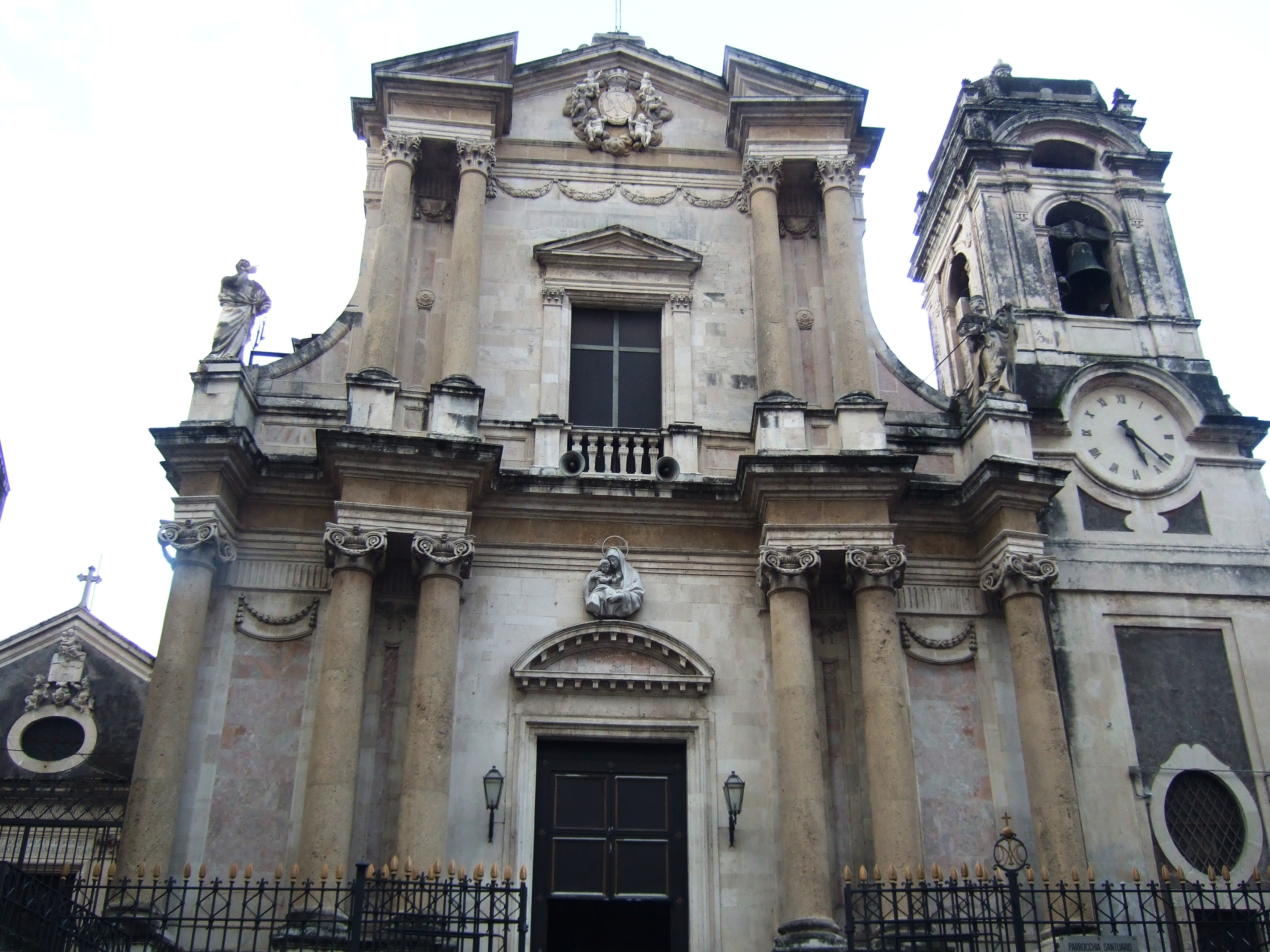
- Facade and bell-tower
- Santa Maria dell'Aiuto
- 37°30′02.7″N 15°04′54.1″E
- Location: Via Santa Maria dell’Aiuto 80, Catania, Sicily
- Country: Italy
- Denomination: Roman Catholic

History
- Status: Parish church

Architecture
- Functional status: Active
- Architectural type: Church

Santa Maria dell’Aiuto is a Roman Catholic parish church and located on Via Santa Maria dell’Aiuto #80, where it encounters Via San Giovanni and Via Consolato della Seta, in Catania, Sicily, southern Italy.

== History and description ==
A church at the site named Santissimi Pietro e Paolo, was renamed Santa Maria dell’Aiuto when a venerated icon of the Virgin was moved inside. Razed by the 1693 Sicily earthquake, it was rebuilt with a facade designed by Antonino Battaglia and decorated by Michele Orlando. The facade, approached through a wide staircase of about a dozen steps, has a broken pediment with columns with modified ionic capitals superimposed with two equally tall solid stone columns with corinthian capitals. The lateral volutes are framed by two statues depicting Saints Peter and Paul. Flanking the left of the facade is a bell-tower with a clock. The interior houses an elaborate reliquary in the altar of the Crucifix. The venerated icon of the Virgin is housed above the polychrome marble altar. Statues of St Peter and Paul and a depiction of God the father frame the icon.

The interior contains a chapel hosting a scale replica of the Holy House of Loreto and its marble screen. The second altar on the left contains a Crucifix with a wall of relics. The first altar on the right has a copy of the painting by Filippo Paladini depicting the Martyrdom of Saint Agatha; the original is housed in the cathedral.
