= Santa Maria della Misericordia, Macerata =

Basilica church and Marian shrine in Macerata, Italy

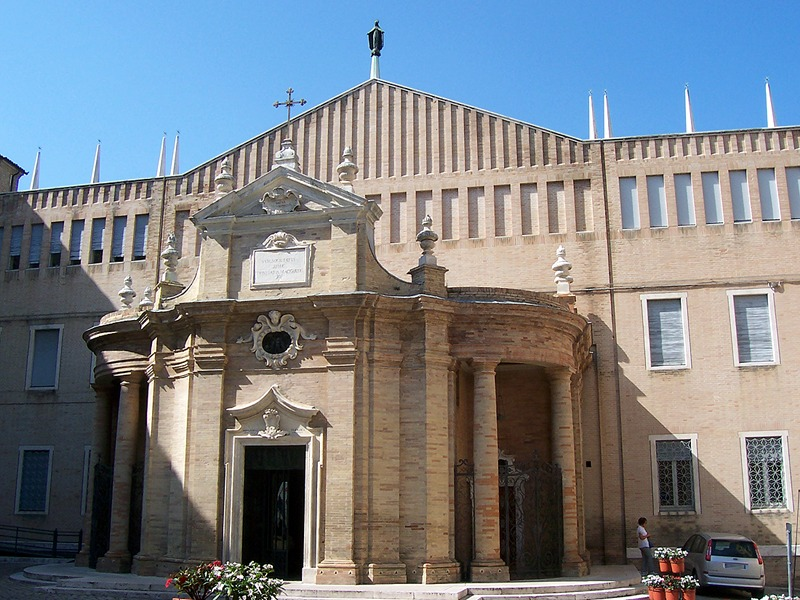
Macerata – Sanctuary of the Madonna della Misericordia

Santa Maria della Misericordia is a Renaissance-style, Roman Catholic basilica church and Marian shrine located on Piazza San Vincenzo Maria Strambi, next to the Cathedral, in the center of Macerata, region of Marche, Italy.

== History ==
A votive chapel has existed at the site since 1447, erected in a single day, after the waning of a plague epidemic. It arose around a venerated icon of the Madonna della Misericordia (Our Lady of the Mercies). In 1497, the chapel was refurbished, and soon thereafter the main altarpiece became a canvas depicting the Madonna della Misericordia Surrounded by Saints Julian, Andrew, Roch and Sebastian, which was painted on the wall surrounding the bishop's orchard. The painting has been attributed to Lorenzo Costa. In 1734, the present church was erected using designs by Luigi Vanvitelli.

The interior space is richly decorated with frescoes, marble, and stucco. In the central Vanvitellian nave, the frescoes, painted by Francesco Mancini depict the Life of Mary, including a ceiling fresco depicting an Assumption of Mary and walls with four ovals depicting Mary at the Temple, Annunciation, Visitation, and Presentation of Jesus at the Temple. The church has two large canvases depicting an Immaculate Conception and a Birth of Mary by Sebastiano Conca. The main altarpiece is the Mater Misericordia work described above now framed by a modern iconostasis.

An ambulatory was added around the nave of Vanvitelli between 1860-1893. In 1921, the painter Biagio Biagetti frescoed in the ambulatory a depiction of the Life of Jesus, in a style influenced by the Italian stile liberty. These frescoes depict a Birth of Jesus, Flight to Egypt, Marriage at Cana, Crucifixion, Deposition, Pentecost, Dormitio Virginia, and a Holy Family. Biagetti also provided the designs for the stained glass windows completed by Cesare Picchiarini. The structure was provided with an external portico and elegant iron gates. The bronze doors (1952) were completed by C. Cantalamessa.
