= San Giorgio, Macerata =

Church building in Macerata, Italy

Coordinates: 43°18′04″N 13°27′01″E

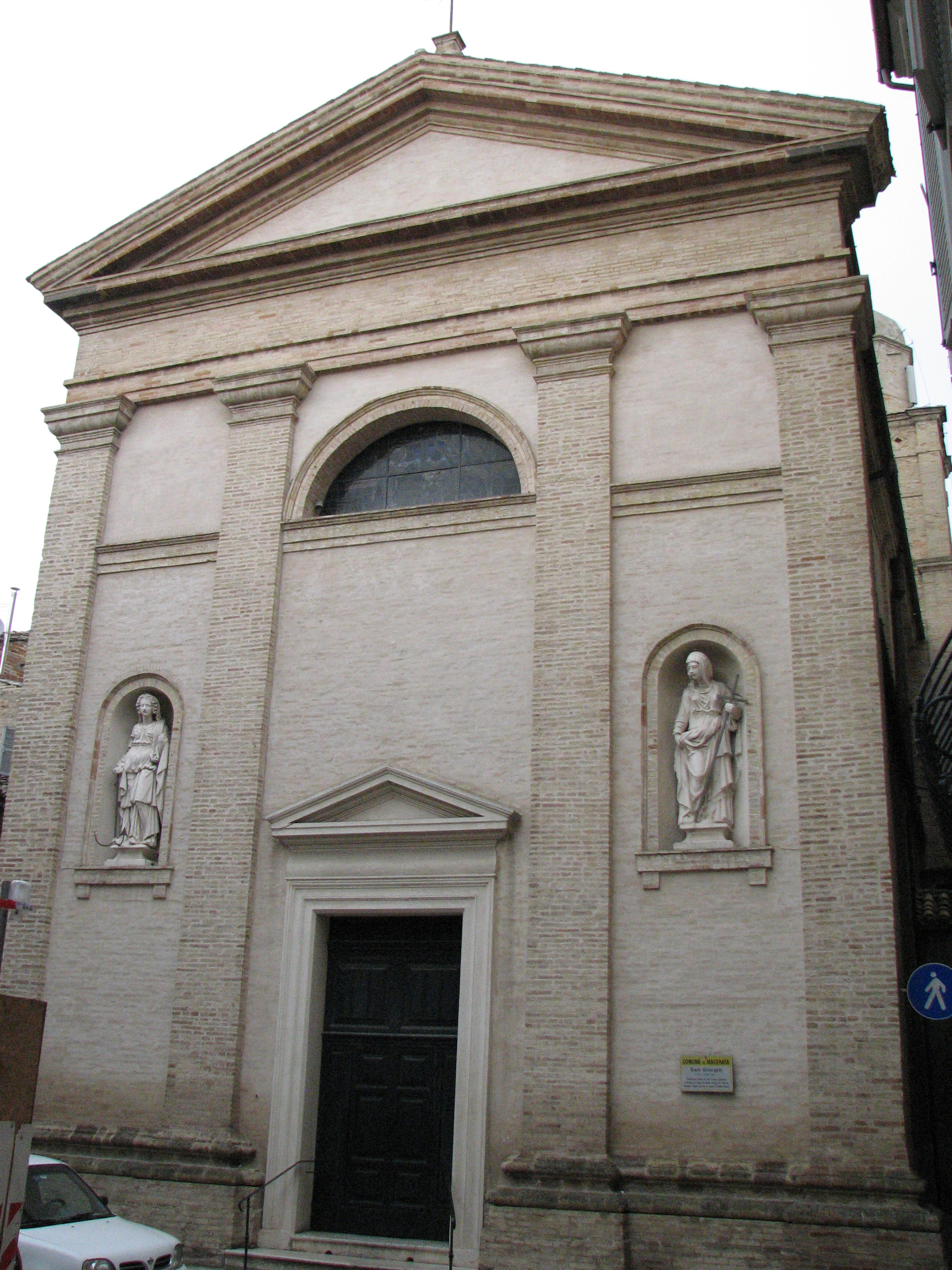
Facade of the Church.

Santo Giorgio is a Neoclassical-style, Roman Catholic church located on Piazza XXX Aprile, in the town Macerata, region of Marche, Italy.

== History ==
A church at the site was present since the 13th century, but the present structure was erected in 1792-1798 by Cosimo Morelli. The classic façade (1842) with giant order pilasters and a triangular tympanum was designed by Agostino Benedettelli. The church is dedicated to Saints George, Stefano, and Martin of Tours. The interior houses a 16th-century wooden crucifix and a venerated icon of a Madonna della Salute attributed to Giovanni Battista Salvi, known as Sassoferrato, donated to the church in 1666.

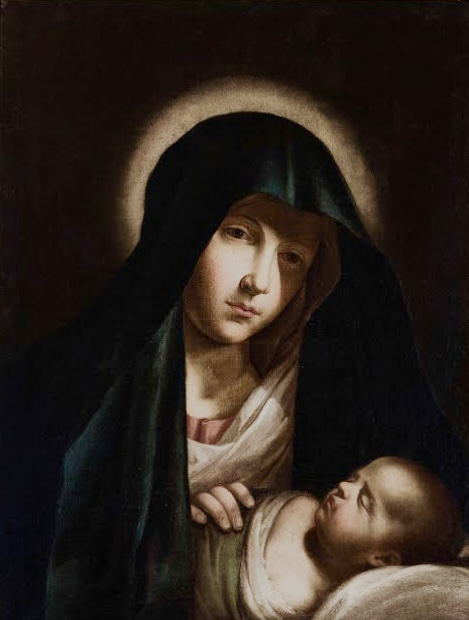
The icon of the Madonna della Salute, crowned in 1749.
