= Santa Maria delle Grazie, Foce di Amelia =

Church building in Amelia, Italy

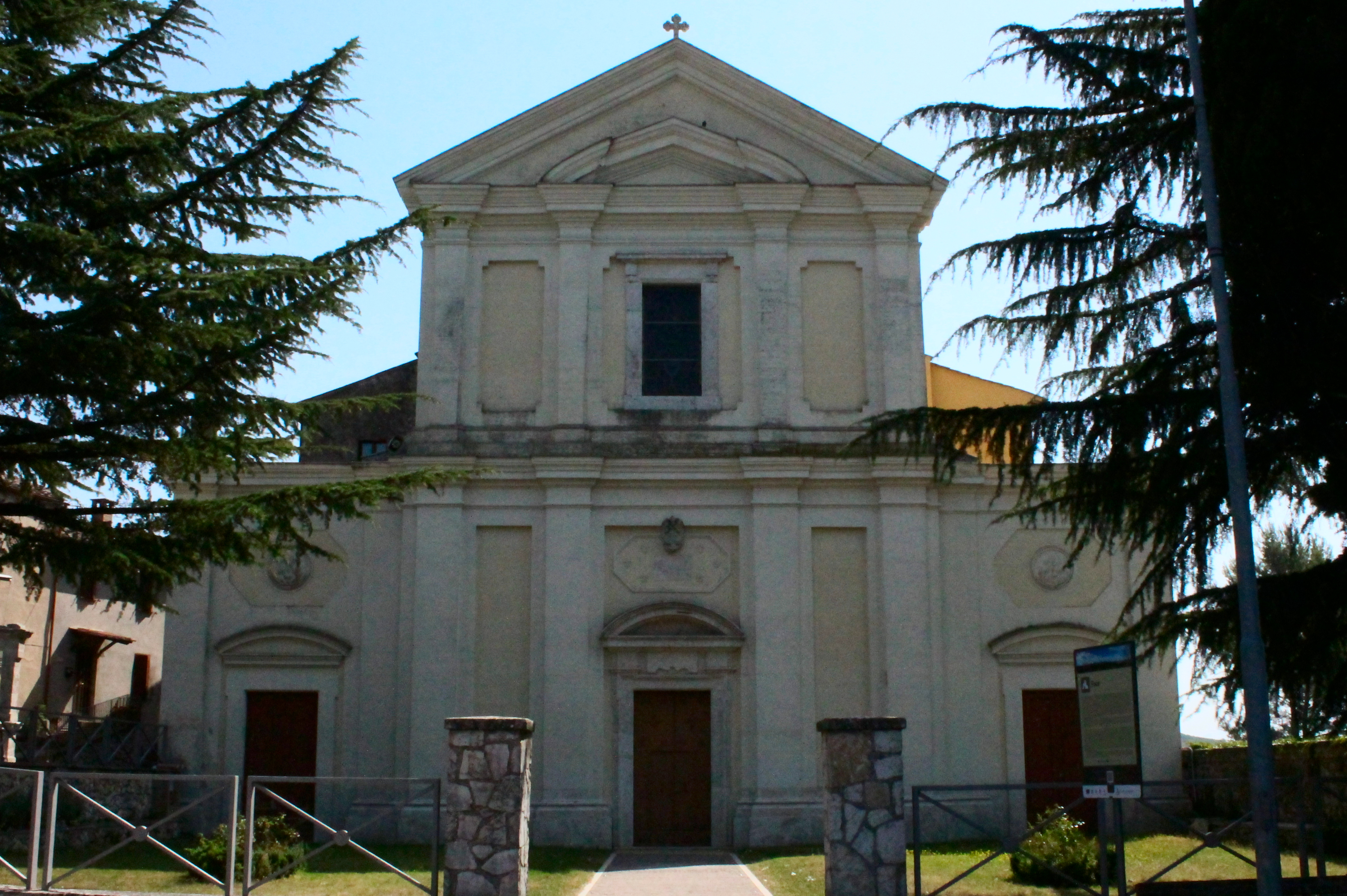
Facade of the church

Santa Maria delle Grazie is a Roman Catholic church located in the hamlet of Foce, near the town of Amelia, in the Province of Terni, region of Umbria, Italy. It presently houses monks from the cistercian congregation of St Bernard.

The church is a Marian sanctuary, completed in 1648, erected to house a more ancient icon of the Virgin and Child that was previously located alongside the Beccio stream which is at the foot of the surrounding hills. On 13 May 1629, the image was translated, supposedly by a miracle, to the present site, prompting the erection of the sanctuary. An elaborate baroque frame behind the main altar frames the icon. The image of the Virgin was crowned by Pope Pius IX on 13 June 1859. On every 8 September, celebrating the day of Mary's birth, a ceremony is held in the church.
