= Sanctuary of Santa Maria dei Bisognosi =

Sanctuary in Pereto, Italy

The Sanctuary of Madonna dei Bisognosi (translation: Madonna of the Needy), also known as the Santuario Madonna del Monte for it location atop monte Serra Secca, is a Roman Catholic church outside of Pereto, Province of L'Aquila (Abruzzo).

There are a series of legends about the founding of the sanctuary, centered around a venerated wooden icon of the Virgin kept in the church. The first documents citing the Sanctuary appear to be from the 12th-century, and cite its existence in 1065. the documents also narrate the story that putatively, in the year 610, a converted Jew spirited the icon from Seville Spain to protect it from destruction by the invading Saracens. While it was being transported my a mule, the animal stopped here and died, prompting the nearby residents to erect the sanctuary. Putatively it was visited by and ill Pope Boniface IV in June of 613. The church has numerous frescoes from the second half of the 15th century by Jacopo di Arsoli, Desiderio da Subiaco, and Petrus. In 1902 it was named a national monument.
