= Sant'Agostino, Lucca =

Gothic Roman Catholic Church

Coordinates: 43.8455°N 10.5021°E

Sant'Agostino is a Gothic-style, Roman Catholic church located in the piazza of the same name in central Lucca, Tuscany, Italy.

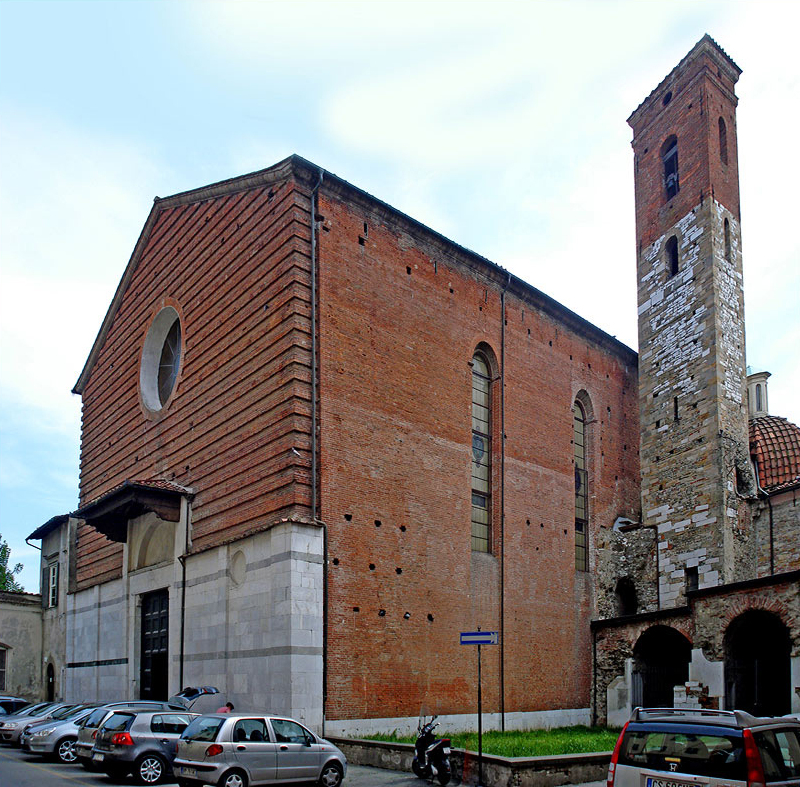
Facade

== History ==
The church was rebuilt in the 14th-century adjacent to an Augustinian monastery, on the site of a prior church called San Salvatore in Mura. Remains of the former church, and an ancient Roman theater are visible in the base of the bell-tower.

A legend attached to the church is that a man once tossed a stone against the icon of the Madonna and fell through a trapdoor into a tunnel that led to the infernos of Hell. The trapdoor is now sealed.

The interior was refurbished in 1664, with a single nave and three apse chapels. On the lateral walls, are frescoes of the Risen Christ pointing to an image of the Madonna with Saints Peter, Augustine, Andrew, Francis, and Nicola da Tolentino by Giacinto Gemignani. In the chapel on right, is an icon of the Madonna del Sasso.
