= Santa Maria della Rosa, Lucca =

Church building in Lucca, Italy

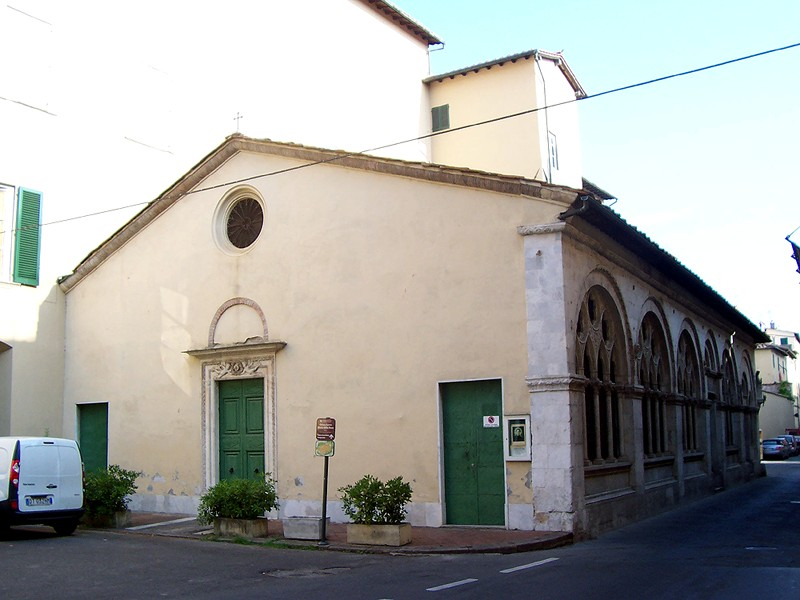
Lucca - Church of S. Maria della Rosa

Santa Maria della Rosa is a Gothic- style, Roman Catholic church located on Via della Rosa in central Lucca, region of Tuscany, Italy.

== History ==
The church as we see it dates from a 1309-1333 construction at the site of an older oratory devoted to an icon of the Madonna, holding a Rose, and with St Peter and St Paul. The church was adjacent to the Roman walls of Lucca. One of the portals has sculpted ornaments of a Dragon breathing roses. The facade remained incomplete till the end of the 15th century.

The main altarpiece is the famous icon of the Madonna of the Rose. The church was visited frequently during 1900 to 1903, by Saint Gemma Galgani. Every April 11, the anniversary of her death is celebrated. The church also has tombs of Francesco Geminiani and Luigi Boccherini.

Among the paintings is a Noli me Tangere by Domenico Passignano and a Nativity by Federico Zuccari.
