= San Tommaso, Lucca =

Church building in Lucca, Italy

Coordinates: 43°50′42″N 10°29′53″E

San Tommaso or San Tommaso in Pelleria is a Romanesque- style, Roman Catholic church located on Piazza of the same name in central Lucca, region of Tuscany, Italy.

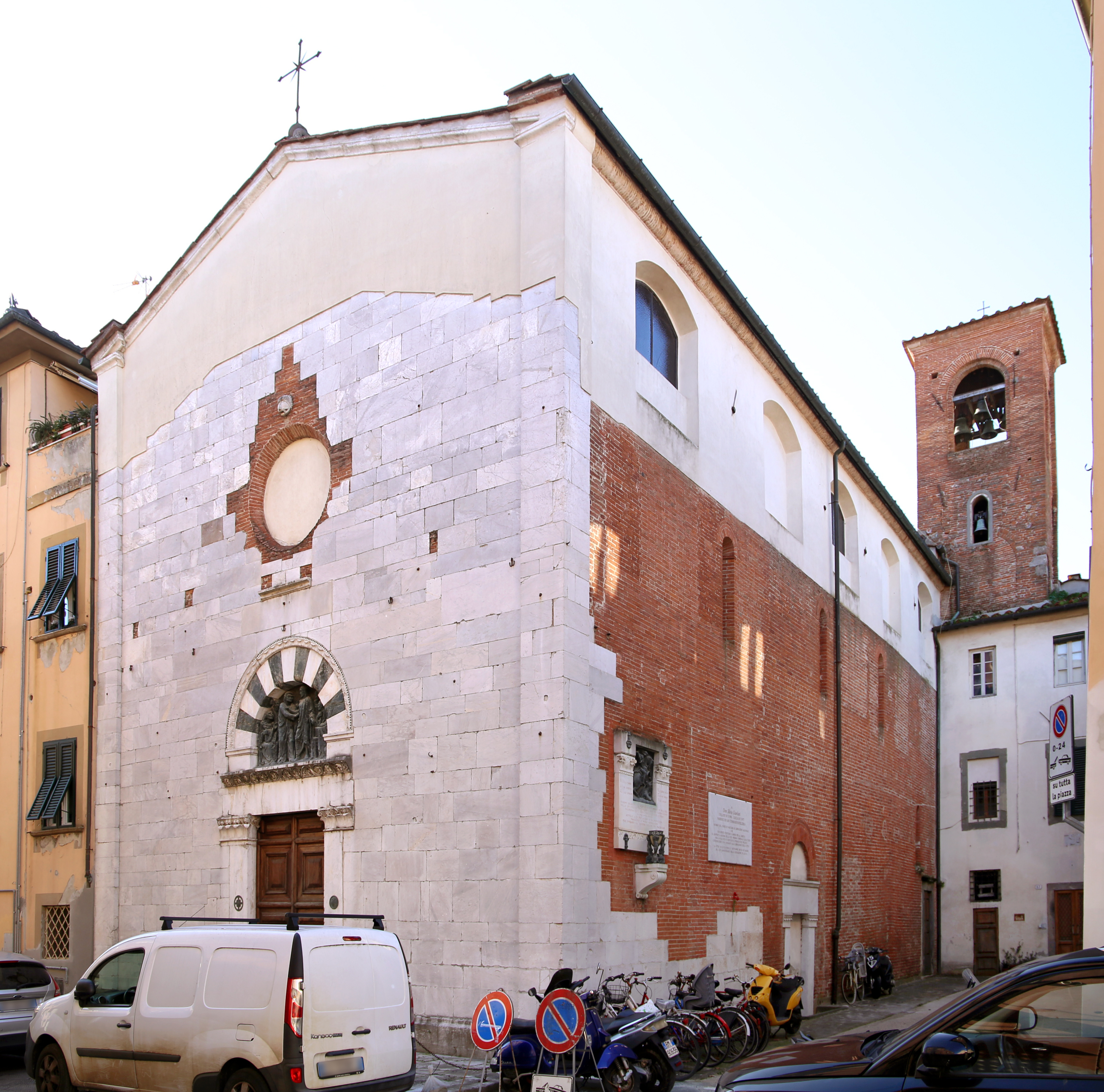
Facade

== History ==
The main design of the church dates from a reconstruction pursued during the 12th and 13th centuries. A church had been present at the site with the 8th century. The 13th-century facade has a sober white stone surface with a single oculus and a decorated central marble and dark stone portal.

The interior was refurbished in later centuries. Among the works displayed inside are a St Anthony of Padua by Giovanni Domenico Ferrucci, a Sermon of Francis Xavier by Antonio Franchi. The church also has three large canvases depicting the Immaculate Conception, the Incredulity of St Thomas Apostle, and Martyrdom of St Thomas Apostle by Giovanni Coli and Filippo Gherardi. The main altarpiece is an icon of the madonna transferred here from the Monastery of Santa Giustina. The belltower is located near the apse.
