= Santuario di Maria Santissima della Fontenuova =

Sanctuary in Tuscany, Italy

Coordinates: 43°52′11″N 10°48′51″E

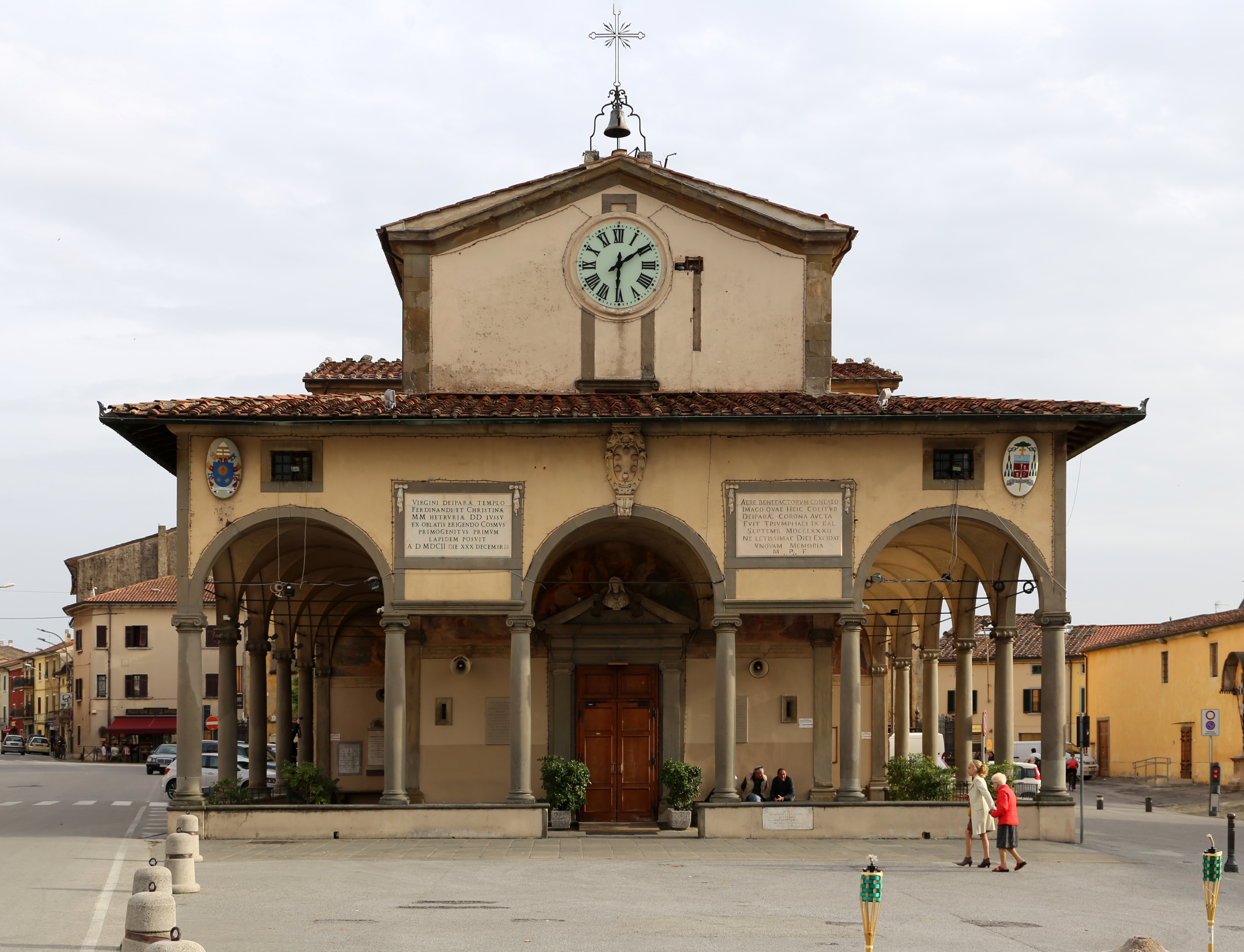

The Santuario di Maria Santissima della Fontenuova, or Sanctuary of the Holiest Mary of the New Fountain/Spring, is a Marian shrine (church) in piazza Giusti #305 in Monsummano Terme, Tuscany, Italy.

== History ==
Until the 16th century, the region where the church stands was fallow swampy land, only frequented by shepherds. In 9 June 1573, a simple shepherdess, Jacopina Mariotti, lost he flock near here, and prayed to a series of images painted on a small wall at this spot. Putatively a Marian apparition or vision informed the girl of where her flock was found.

This prompted the locals to erect this Marian shrine dedicated to the Madonna of the Planes (Madonna del Piano). Initially this was a small chapel, but putatively increasing miracles, including during a 10 June 1602 service by the town rector Simone Casciani, after a long drought, a spring burst at the spot, this prompted the enlargement of the sanctuary under the patronage of the Grand Duke Ferdinand I de’ Medici in a building designed by Gherardo Mechini.

Construction began on 30 December 1602, in a ceremony attended the court including the prince Cosimo and the wife of Ferdinand, Maria Cristina di Lorena. In 1607, the Grand Duke commissioned erection of a Hostel for pilgrims, adjacent to the Sanctuary. In 1607, Ferdinand donated a bejeweled crown by Cosimo Latini to the sanctuary. A number of artists helped decorate the sanctuary including Bronzino, Cosimo Rosselli, and Domenico Passignano. The ceiling paintings in the nave are a Virgin of the Assumption by Matteo Rosselli; an Annunciation by Gregorio Pagani and a Coronation of the Virgin by Donato Mascagni. The ceiling frieze contains a Veduta di Monsummano Alto (1607) and Prophets, attributed to Vanni da Vellano (1607), while the Sibyls were painted by Giovanni Valeriani. The next register has Saints Sebastian, Jerome, Francis, and Carlo Borrromeo painted by Matteo Rosselli. He also painted an altarpiece depicting the Adoration by the Magi. An altarpiece depicting the Presentation of Mary at the Temple is attributed to Cristofano Allori and the Mary, St Anne and John the Baptist by Pier Dandini. A Crucifix in the sacristy is attributed to Giambologna. Giovanni Mannozzi, also called Giovanni da San Giovanni, frescoed starting in 1630 the 14 lunettes under the loggia. The central lunette has a bust of Maria Cristina flanked by moderately damaged frescoes by Ventura Salimbeni.

The sanctuary is still the goal of pilgrimages (Peregrinatio Mariae) and processions. They crypt, built in 1962 still has the spring coursing through it, feeding an immersion pool meant to heal the sick. In 1962, the Madonna of Fontenova was proclaimed the patron of the diocese of Pescia. In 1974, cardinal Paolo Bertoli, Camarlengo of the Vatican, announced that Pope Paul VI had elevated the sanctuary to a minor basilica.

In the space in front of the church is a Monument to the poet Giuseppe Giusti, sculpted by Cesare Fantacchiotti.
