= Santuario della Beata Vergine Addolorata, Osimo =

Building in Campocavallo, Italy

Coordinates: 43.4604°N 13.4964°E

The Santuario della Beata Vergine Addolorata (Sanctuary of the Blessed Virgin in Grief) is a Roman Catholic church located on Via Cagiata 101 in the frazione of Campocavallo, a few kilometers from the town of Osimo, region of Marche, Italy.

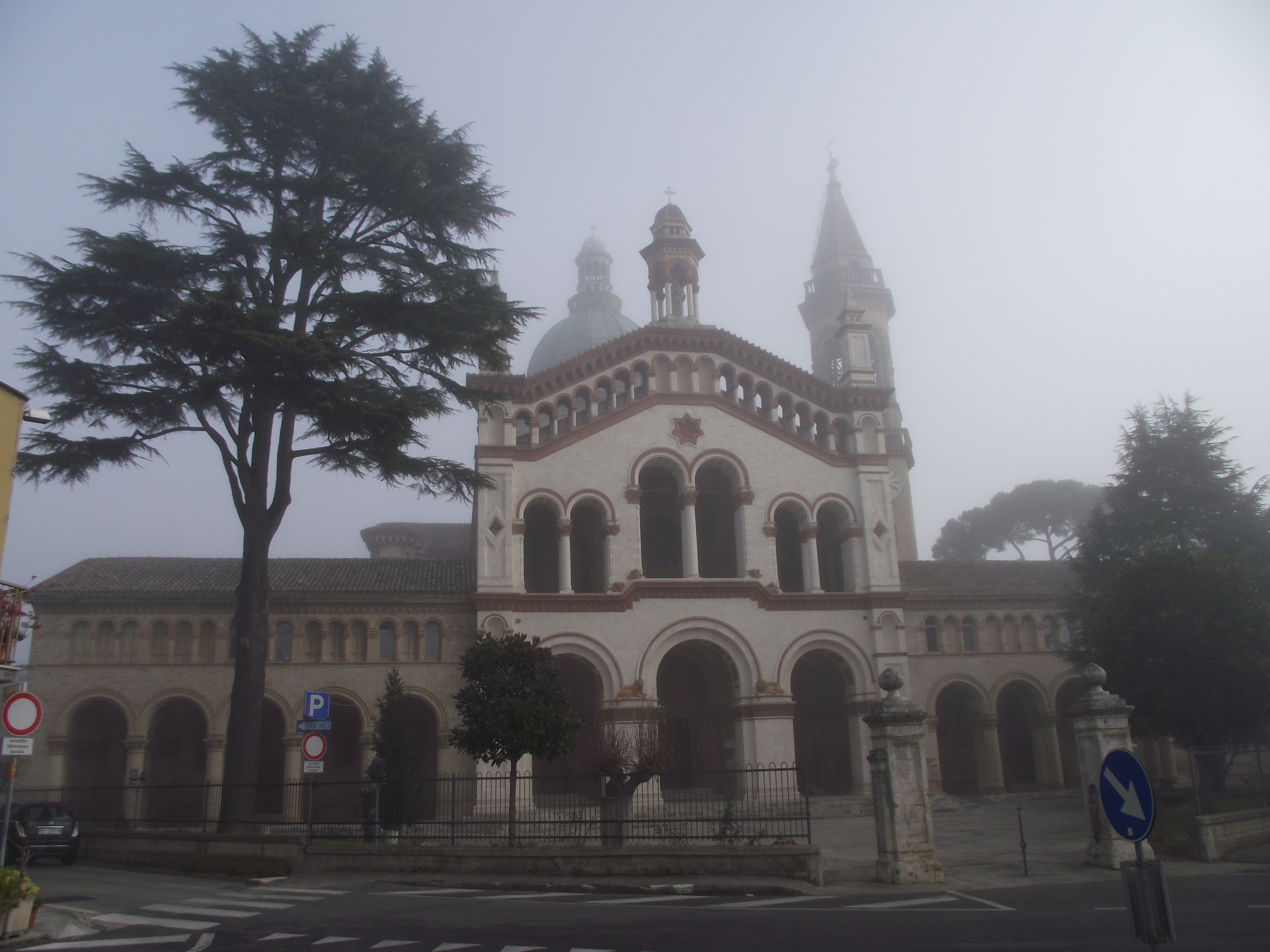
Facade of sanctuary

== History ==
Construction of the Sanctuary began in 1892 using designs of local architect Costantino Costantini, and the church was consecrated in 1905. Previously the site had an icons of the Madonna in a small chapel. In June 1892, a miraculous observation occurred when the icon was seen to weep tears, leading to an outpouring of venerations and erection of the present church. The church was built in a Neo-Romanesque-style
