= Santa Maria della Catena, Aci Catena =

Church in Sicily, Italy

Coordinates: 37.6°N 15.1°E

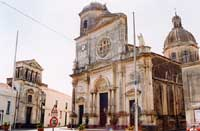
Facade of church

Santa Maria della Catena is a Roman Catholic parish church located in Aci Catena in the region of Sicily, Italy.

== History and description ==
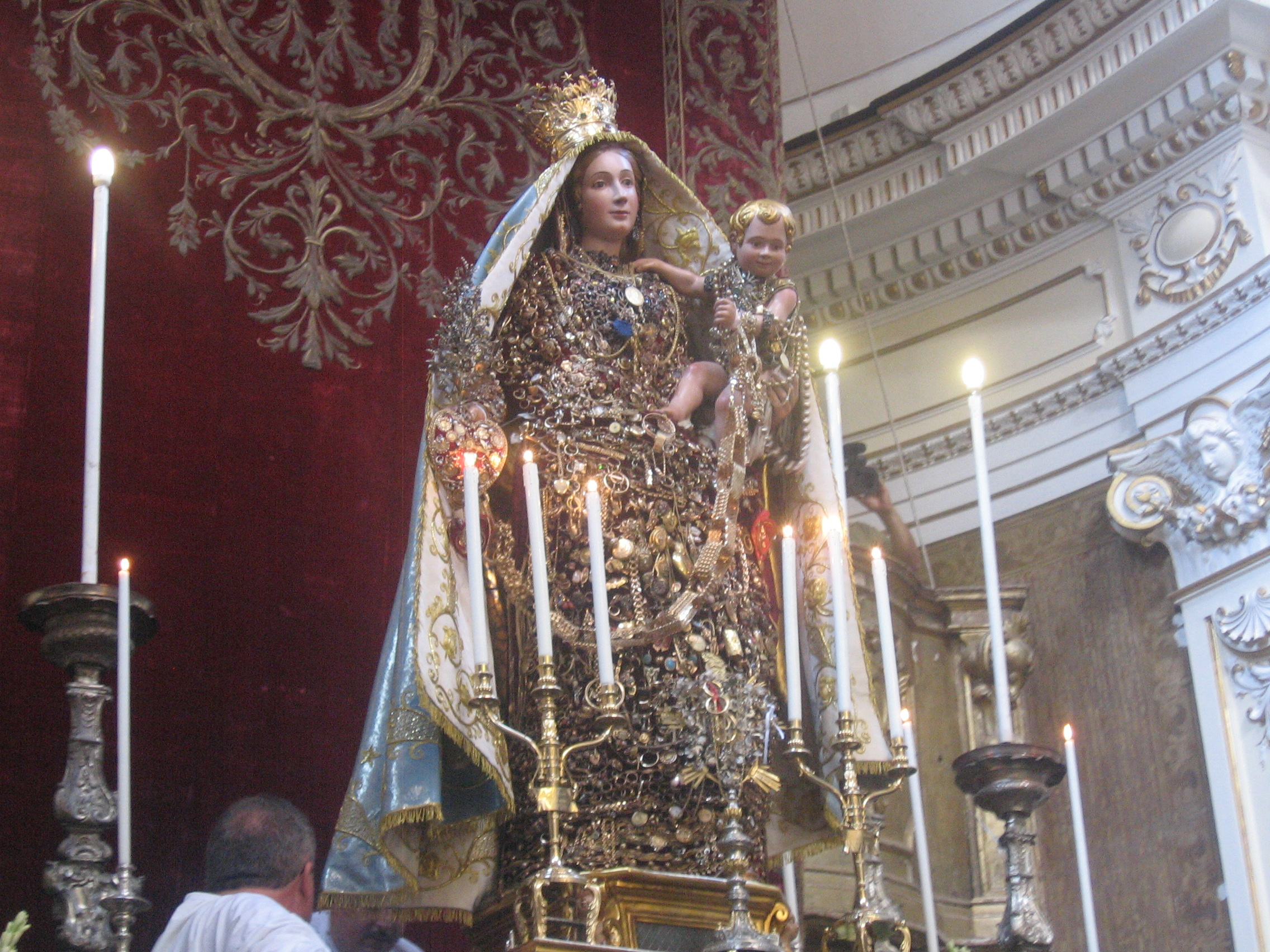
Madonna della Catena icon

A chapel or oratory at the site was built in the early 15th-century, starting with an icon painted on a wall. A first enclosed capel was built in 1576, and in 1586, a church was begun. By 1686, it was named the Mother Church (Chiesa Matrice) for the region. The church was nearly destroyed the 1693 Sicily earthquake, but the survival of chapel sheltering the icon was viewed as a miracle, leading to a swift new reconstruction, promoted by the prince Riggio di Campofiorito. The cupola was completed in 1695. In 1710, the church was also dedicated to the martyr San Candido, whole body was putatively pilfered from the Catacombs of San Callisto in Rome, donated to the church by Riggio, and placed on a crystal urn on the main altar.

In 1953, the city government voted to claim the icon of the Madonna of Catena as representing their patron. The church was named a Marian Sanctuary in 1954. A bejeweled icon of Madonna and Child held here in the church is paraded through town in August.

The interior has a fresco depicting Rebecca at the Well by Pietro Paolo Vasta. The apse also has a fresco of the liberation of the three condemened Palermitan Christians, a miracle that gained the dedication of to Maria della Catena (Chains).
