= Santuario di Maria Santissima di Custonaci =

Sanctuary of Maria Santissima di Custonaci
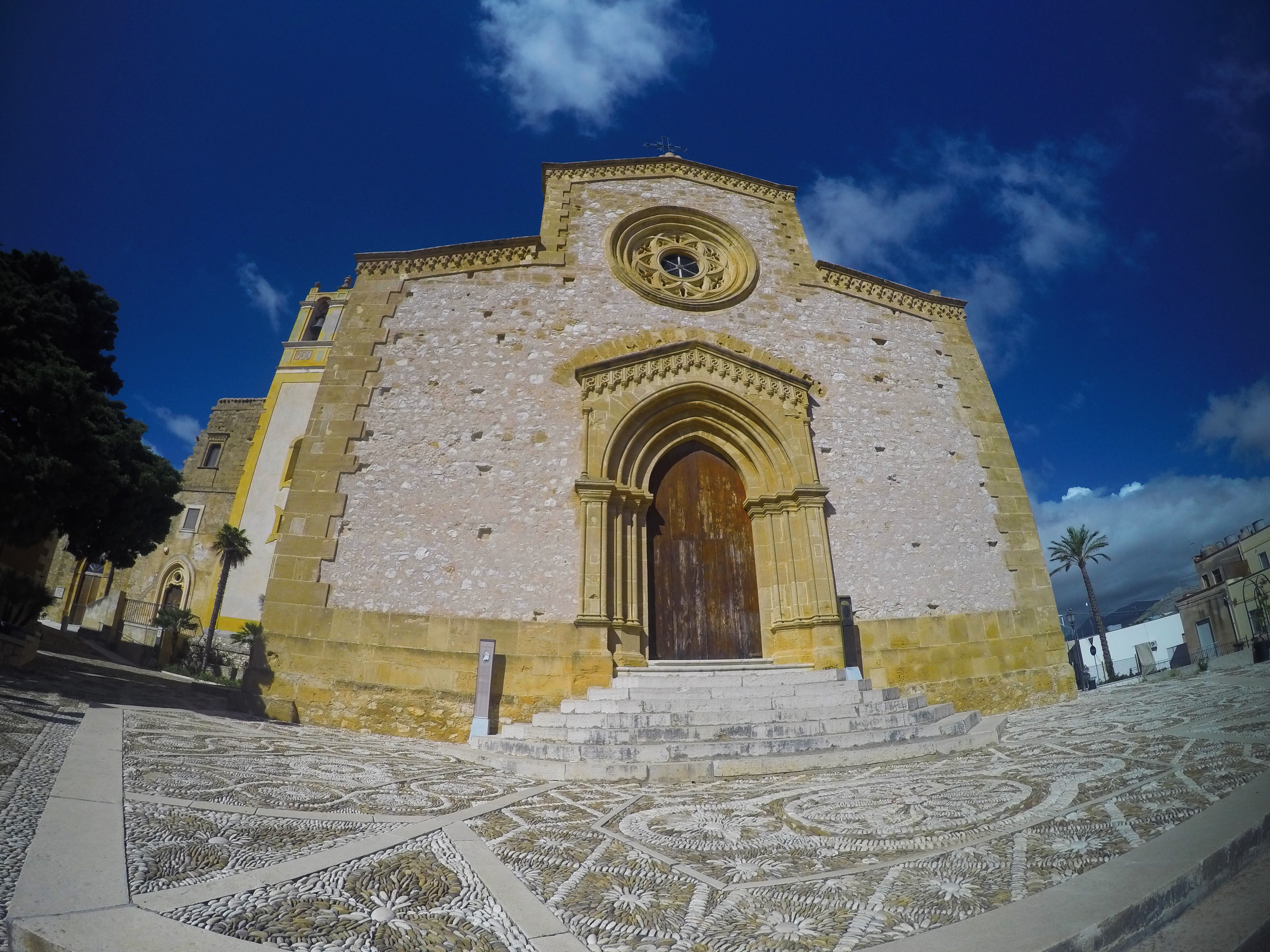
- The façade

Religion
- Province: province of Trapani
- Region: Sicily
- Rite: Catholic
- Patron: Maria Santissima of Custonaci
- Year consecrated: 1578

Location
- Location: Custonaci, province of Trapani, Italy
- Municipality: Custonaci
- State: Italy
- Interactive map of Sanctuary of Maria Santissima di Custonaci
- Territory: Custonaci
- Coordinates: 38°04′42″N 12°40′33″E

Architecture
- Style: Gothic
- Groundbreaking: 1575

Website
- http://www.santuariocustonaci.it/

The Sanctuary of Maria Santissima di Custonaci is a Catholic Church located in the town centre of Custonaci (province of Trapani) dedicated to Mary. Madonna of Custonaci is the patroness and guardian of the communes of agro Erice.

== History ==
Its construction dates back nearly to the second half of the 16th century, on a previous chapel of the Immaculate Conception. As time passed by, the chapel has been restored and enlarged several times.

The first works were done in 1536, then between 1727 and 1772, and finally the biggest restoration between 1870 and 1900 by Monsignor Giuseppe Rizzo, who wholly modified the sanctuary, including the imposing staircase, the Gothic style façade and the columns.

The homonymous parish was erected in 1909; in 2012, some works of liturgical adaptation of the presbytery enriched the sanctuary with a new altar, a new ambon and a new seat, with the repositioning of the 18th century balustrade.

=== Architecture ===
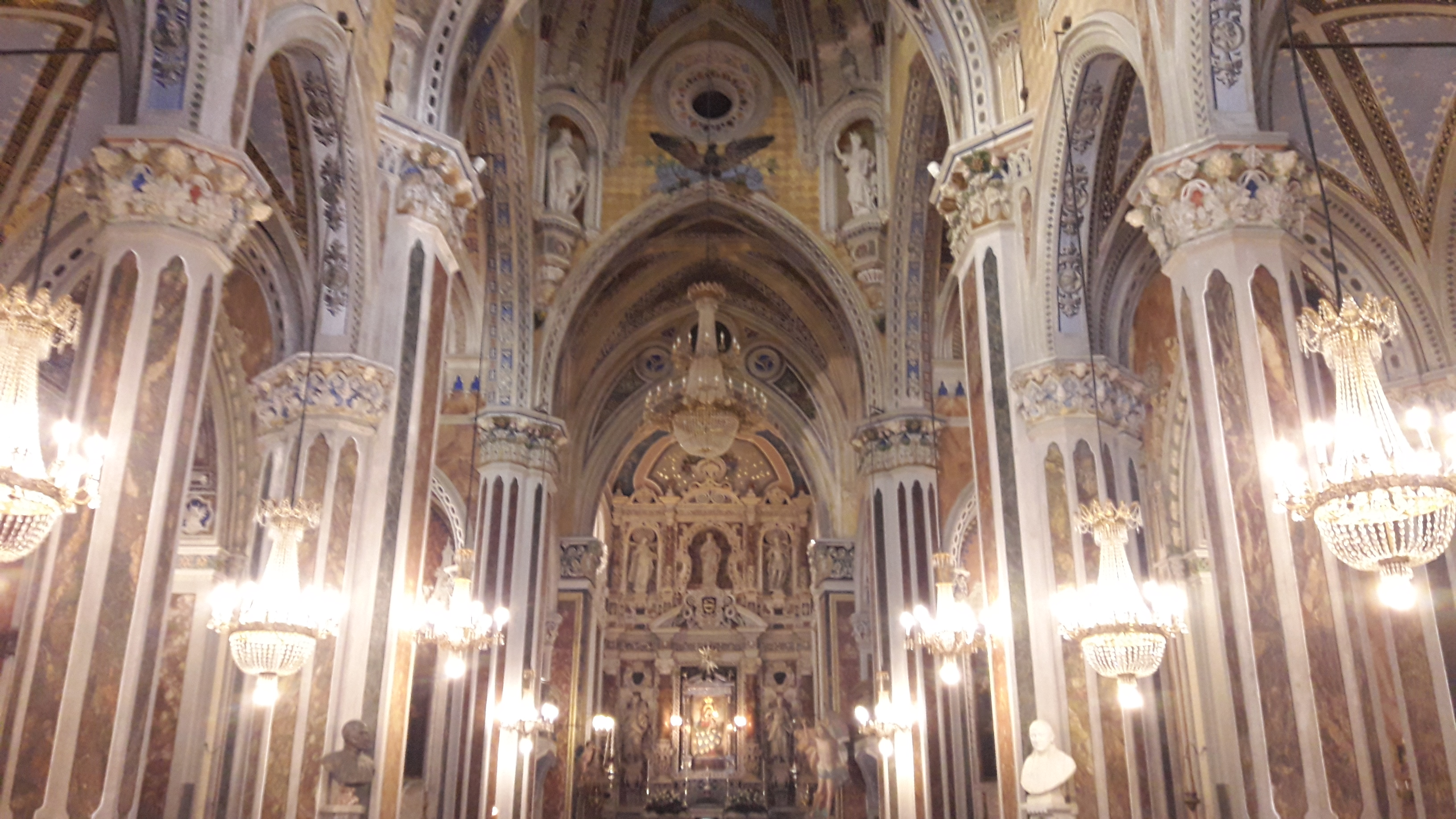
Interior of the sanctuary

A particular parvis surrounds the sanctuary: it is paved with small river pebbles which create unique and elegant geometrical and floral patterns. The façade has a rose window made with tufa and coloured glasses. Its interior shape is a Roman cross with three different naves, divided by columns in brickwork and painted with marble effects, from which acute sixth arches (calling back the Gothic) raise.

The high altar, realized in baroque style in 1627, is embellished by polychrome marbles; in the marble complex of the presbytery there is a statue of the Immaculate Conception, dating back to the first half of the 17th century, and the wooden statues of Saint Albert and Saint Julian, patrons of Erice, on the two sides.

In the lower central part, we can admire the image of Maria Santissima di Custonaci, a precious painting realized by Antonello da Messina in the 15th century. In front of it they placed the Lamp of Peace, donated by the communes of the Agro Ericino in 2011, which is always lighted.

=== Works ===
In the Cappellone there are the 18th century wooden carved choir, surmounted by two early 18th century frescoes by Domenico La Bruna, the Nativity of the Virgin Mary and the Nativity of Christ with shepherds.

On the right nave, near the entrance, there is a painting of Ecce Homo, and on the side door a fresco representing the Transport of the painting, placed inside the Vara, to Erice.

At the end of the right nave there are two altars: in the right one there is a wooden Crucifix dating back to the 18th century and a statue of the Madonna in paper mache; on the opposite altar there is a painting of Saint Peter Nolasco (late 17th century-early 18th) made by Giuseppe Felici.

On the left nave, near the entrance, there is a painting with the Nativity and Saint Francis and Saint Roch by Domenico La Bruna; below it the baptistry, with a marble part realized by Mario Bruno and sons in 1884, and a wooden part made by the sculptor in legno Giacomo Miceli in 1891.

Above the left door there is a fresco representing the landing of Mary's image at Cala di Buguto; next to it there is a wooden confessional box; at the end of this nave there are two altars: inn the left one there is the wooden statue of Saint Joseph the Worker (1800), in the opposite one a painting with the representation of Death (or Passing away) by Giuseppe Felici.

In the adjoining museum you can see a tempera painting on wood dating back to 1541, realized by the workshop of Crescenzio, representing the Madonna enthroned with Child.

=== The Marian Cult of Madonna di Custonaci ===
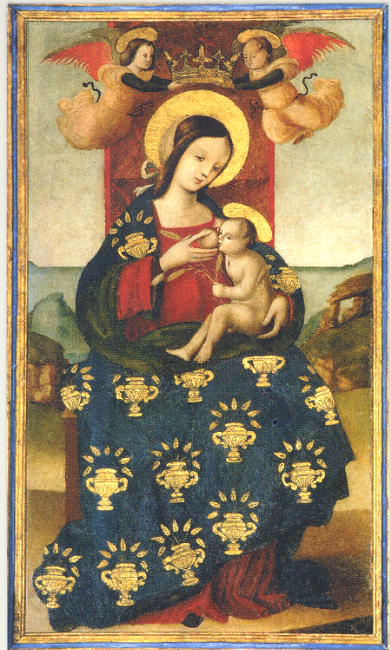
The painting of Madonna di Custonaci by the workshop of Antonello da Messina

A picture of the Nursing Madonna accompanied with the Baby Jesus, gives rise to the worship. In 1400, according to tradition, a painting was donated by a French ship carrying the picture from Alexandria and escaping a storm after invoking Holy Mary, taking shelter in the gulf of Cornino. In a short time it substituted the ancient cult for the goddess Venus in Agro Erice.

Actually, it is a poplar plank prepared with chalk and oil painted, where scholars have detected the hand of an artist from the workshop of Antonello da Messina. Its recent restoration has uncovered a date difficult to be read: 1471 or 1521.

The cult for Maria Santissima di Custonaci, thanks to her several miracles, extended to all the territory of Agro ericino. In 1630 Monte San Giuliano (the present Erice), following a delibera municipale, elected la Madonna di Custonaci as the principal patroness, but in 1574 Pope Gregory XIII had already given the patronage on the miraculous painting. Owing to a long drought which ended thanks to the divine intervention of the Immaculate, in 1776 Trapani also elected her as its patroness.

There was a great diffusion of the devotion towards this holy Image in many parts of Sicily Favignana, Castelvetrano, Sciacca etc.), but even in Spain, France, Tunisia and in both Americas.

In 1752 the painting was solemnly crowned with a decree and approval of Pope Benedict XIV by the Vatican, with the title of Maria Santissima di Custonaci.

=== The festivity ===
The feast, that according some historical sources started in 1572, lasts four days, from the last Sunday to the last Wednesday of August; some days before there are a Novena and a pilgrimage from Sperone as far as the Sanctuary. On Sunday, before the solemn Mass, the Lord Mayor of Custonaci entrusts the town to Our Lady of Custonaci, lights a large candle and consigns the town keys. They also put the 18th century crowns on the heads of Mary and the Child Jesus. On Sunday night, for a number of years, there is the final evening of the International Festival of Folklore.

On Monday night there is the historical re-enactment of the landing of the holy image at Cornino bay: a ship, followed by several boats, consigns the painting of Madonna to local sailors. The landing, accompanied by the traditional songs of a folkloristic group and fireworks, is followed by the procession for the transport of the Image to the Sanctuary.

On Tuesday evening they celebrate vespers and there are some historical-allegorical carts on the life of Madonna; the feast ends on Wednesday, with the town procession and fireworks.

== See also ==
- Madonna of Trapani
- Sanctuary of Most Holy Mary of the Height
- Madonna di Custonaci, Erice

== Sources ==
- "Santuario Maria Santissima di Custonaci".
- "Santuario Mariano di Custonaci".
- "Festa Maria SS. di Custonaci".
- "MARIA SS. DI CUSTONACI - CUSTONACI". Archived from the original on 2018-01-03.
- ""I FESTEGGIAMENTI IN ONORE DI MARIA SS. DI CUSTONACI"".
- "Da visitare: Santuario dedicato a Maria SS. di Custonaci (TP) e la leggenda del quadro miracoloso".
