= Valle Caudina =

Valley in Campania, Italy

Coordinates: 41°3′N 14°37′E

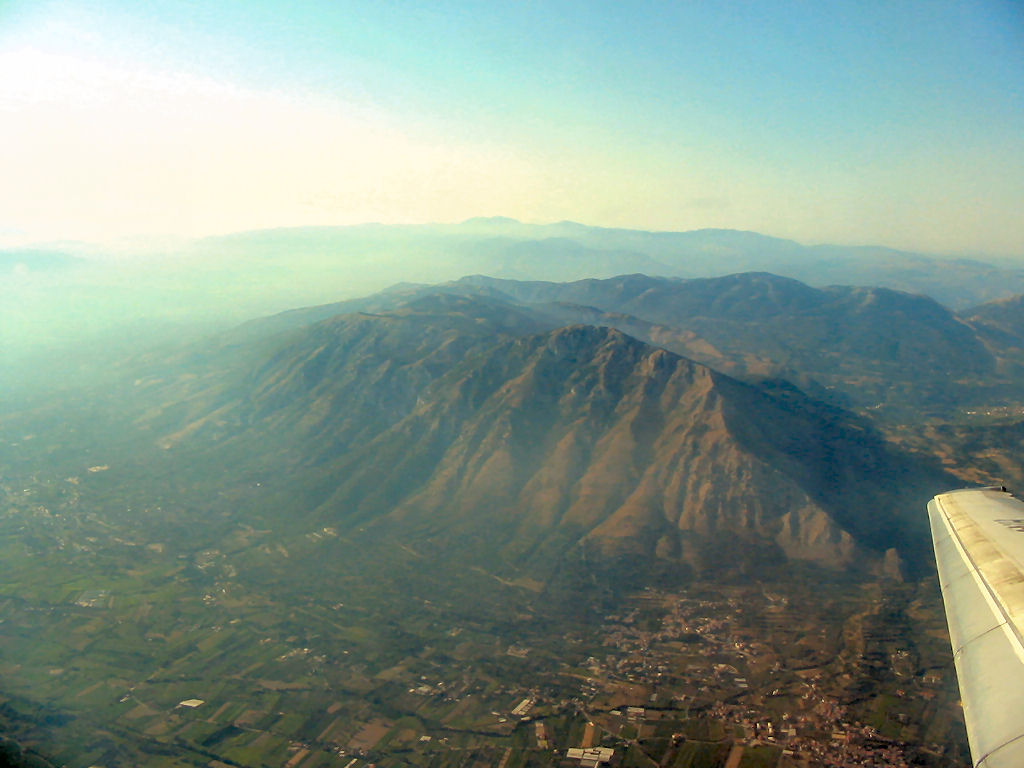
- Seen from Taburnus
- Floor elevation: 280 m (920 ft)

Geography
- Location: Benevento & Avellino, Campania, Italy
- Population centers: Airola, Cervinara, Montesarchio, Sant'Agata de' Goti, San Martino Valle Caudina
- Rivers: Isclero
- Interactive map of Valle Caudina

Valle Caudina (Caudine Valley) is a densely settled Italian valley with about 69,000 inhabitants. It is located in Campania, between the Province of Benevento and the Province of Avellino.

== Comunes ==
In the Valle Caudina there are 14 Italian comuni:

In the province of Avellino (4)

- Cervinara
- Rotondi
- Roccabascerana*
- San Martino Valle Caudina

In the province of Benevento (10)

- Airola
- Arpaia
- Bonea
- Bucciano
- Forchia
- Moiano
- Montesarchio
- Pannarano* (exclave situated within the province of Avellino)
- Paolisi
- Sant'Agata de' Goti*

The comuni with "*" are located in the outskirts of the Valle Caudina (excluding them, the population of the valley is about 52,000).

== Geography ==
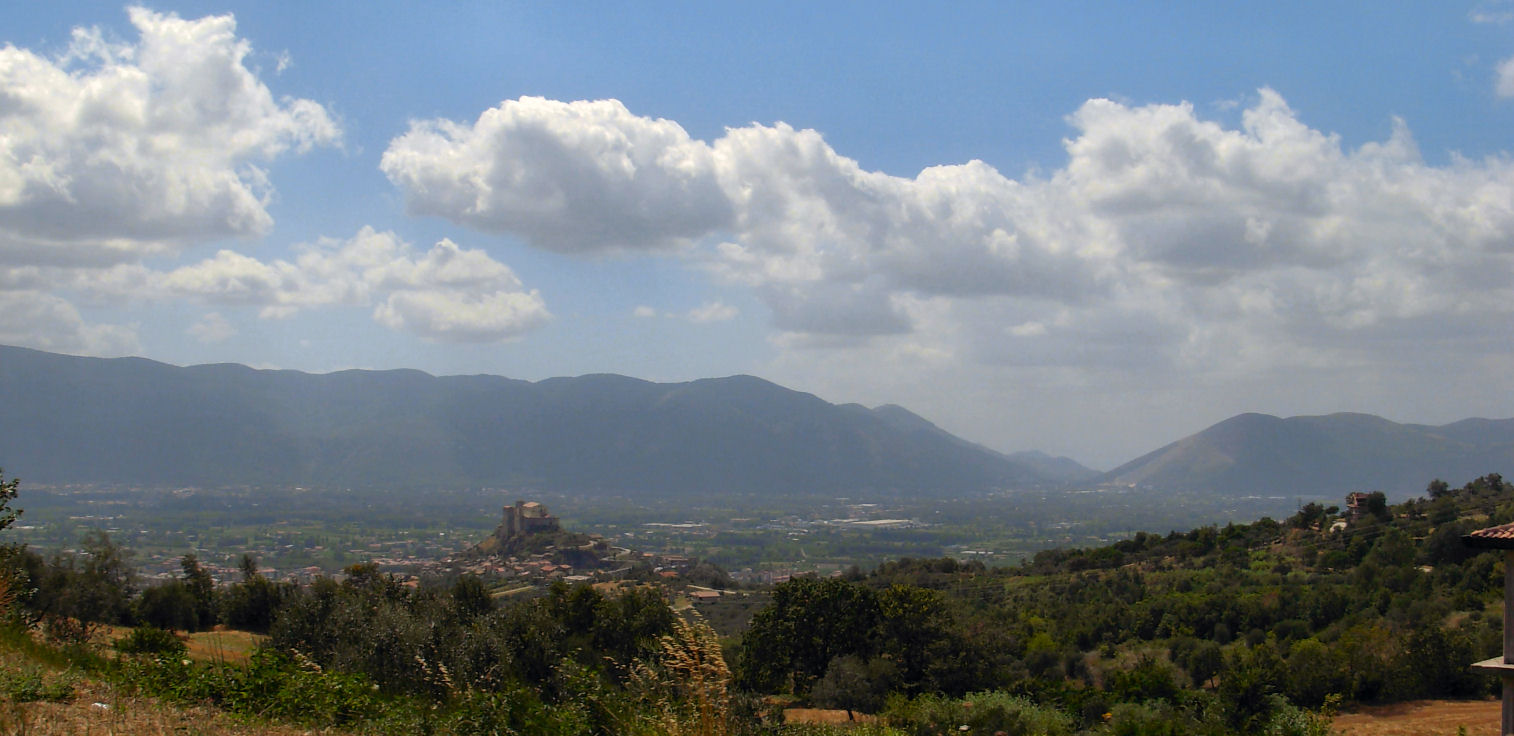
The Valley seen from Taburnus. In the center there is the castle of Montesarchio and on the backgroung there are the Partenio's mountains.

Valle Caudina is in the center of Campania: it is surrounded from the south by Partenio and from the north by Taburnus massif. It is about 20 km from Benevento, 23 km from Avellino, 22 km from Caserta, 38 km from Naples and 57 km from Salerno.

The main west entrance is the Stretta di Arpaia, where the Battle of the Caudine Forks may have been fought, between the mountains of Tairano and Castello; another is the Moiano's gorge. Instead, the east entrance is the passo of Sferracavallo in the comune of Montesarchio.

The Valle Caudina is mostly flat and it is crossed by the Isclero river.

== History ==
Originally, in the valley there was a lake fed by the waters coming from the Taburnus and the Partenio. Ceramic remnants at San Martino Valle Caudina suggest early settlements dating back to the Bronze Age (1800–1000 BC). Around the 8th century BC, the city of Caudium was born. It was the capital of the Caudini tribe, remembered above all for the humiliating defeat of the Caudine Forks that the Samnites inflicted on the Romans in 321 BC during the Samnite Wars.

== Bibliography ==
- Guida d'Italia - Campania, Touring Club Italiano, Milano 2005

== Sources ==
- Valle Caudina website
