= Bonea =

- Comune
- Comune di Bonea
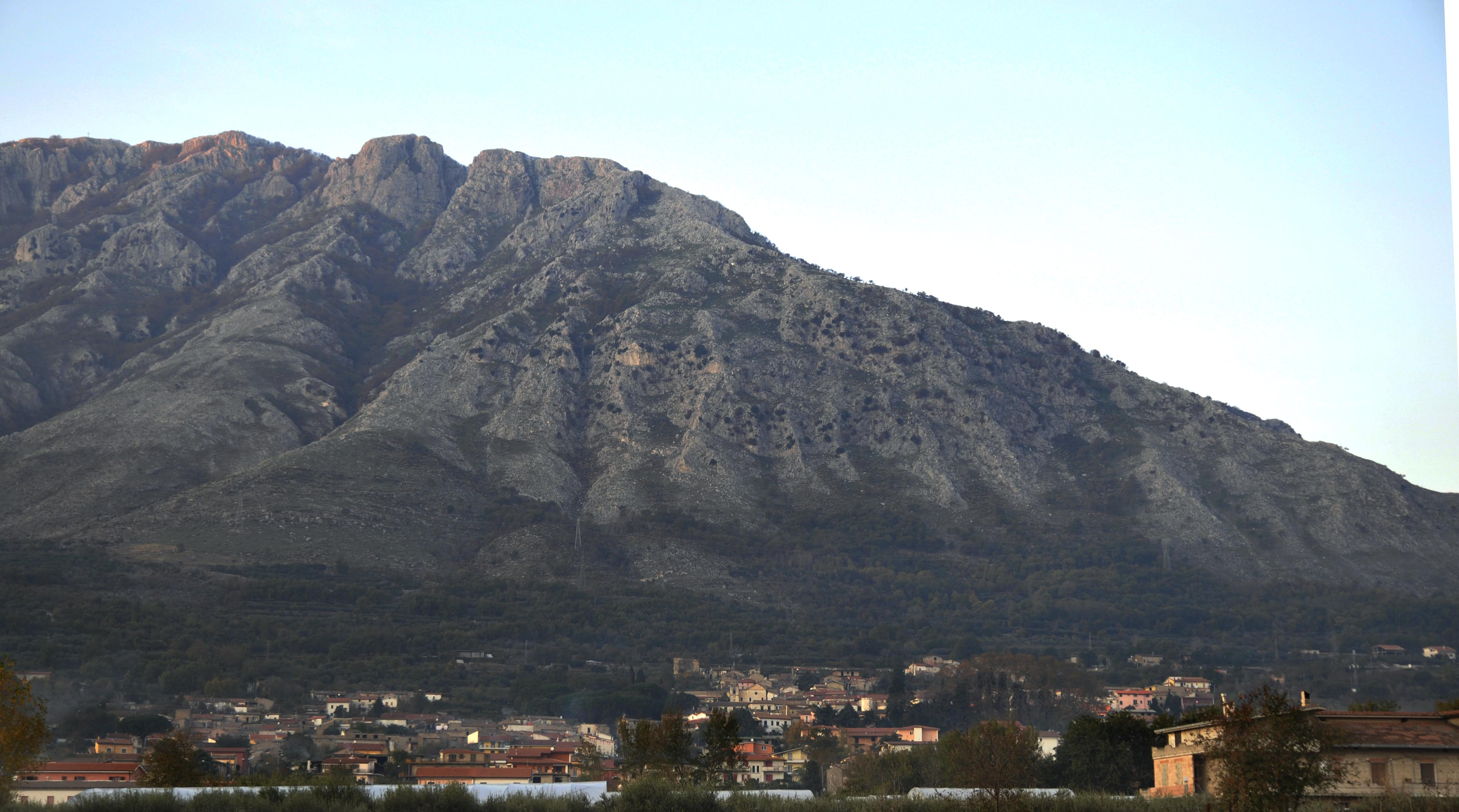
- A view of Bonea at the foot of the Taburnus

- Location within Italy Location within Campania
- Coordinates: 41°4′N 14°37′E
- Country: Italy
- Region: Campania
- Province: Benevento (BN)

Government
  - Mayor: Giampietro Roviezzo

Area
  - Total: 11.46 km^{2} (4.42 sq mi)
- Elevation: 350 m (1,150 ft)

Population (1 January 2020)
  - Total: 1,366
  - Density: 119.2/km^{2} (308.7/sq mi)
- Demonym: Boneani
- Time zone: UTC+1 (CET)
  - Summer (DST): UTC+2 (CEST)
- Postal code: 82013
- Dialing code: 0824
- ISTAT code: 062009
- Patron saint: Saint Nicholas of Bari
- Saint day: 6 December
- Website: Official website

Bonea is a comune (municipality) in the Province of Benevento in the Italian region Campania, located about 40 km (25 mi) northeast of Naples and about 15 km (9.3 mi) southwest of Benevento.

Bonea borders the following municipalities: Airola, Bucciano, Montesarchio, Rotondi, Tocco Caudio.

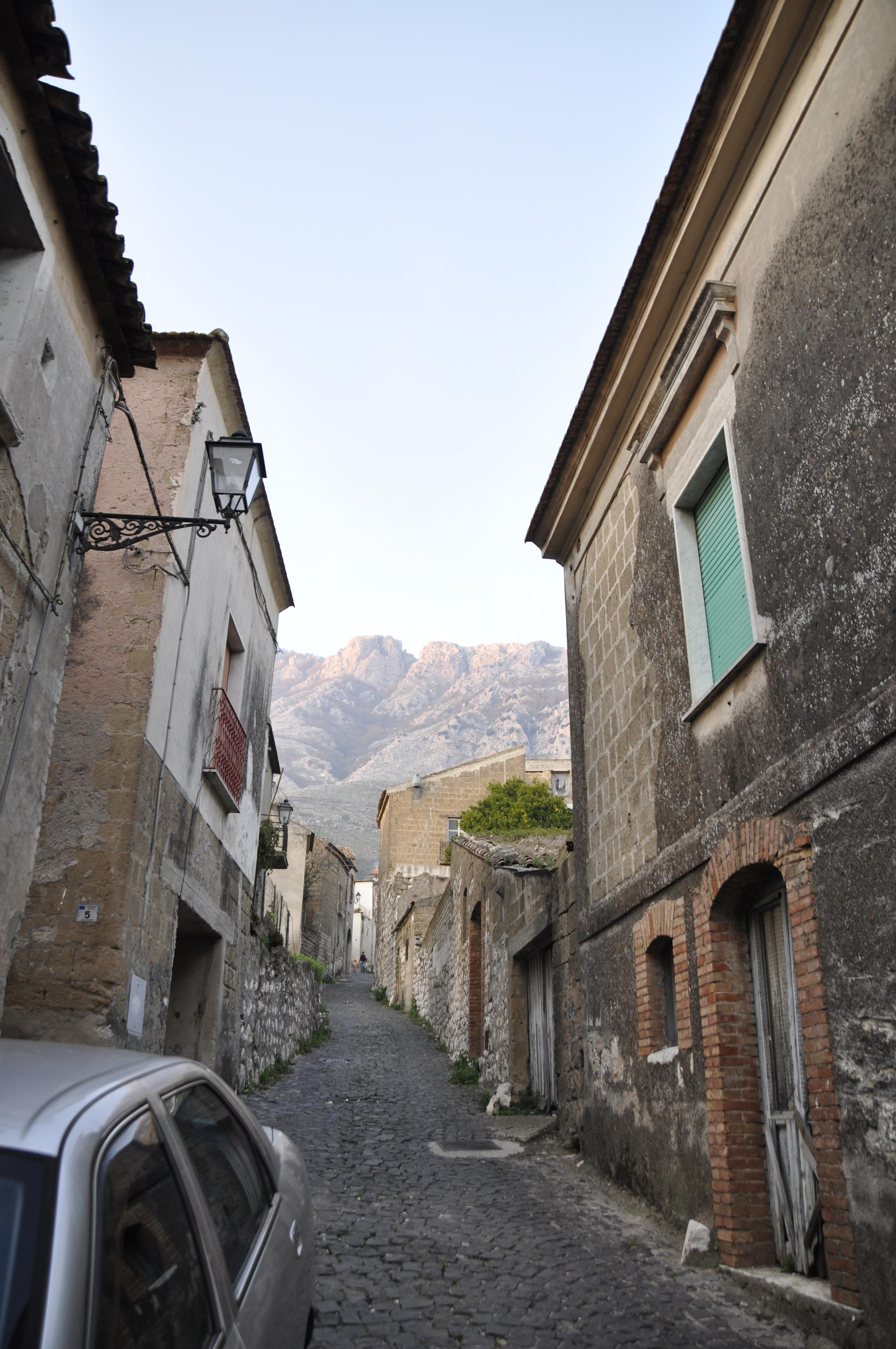
A street of Bonea paved with setts
