= Sanctuary of the Virgin of Taburnus =

Coordinates: 41°5′25.7″N 14°34′28.1″E

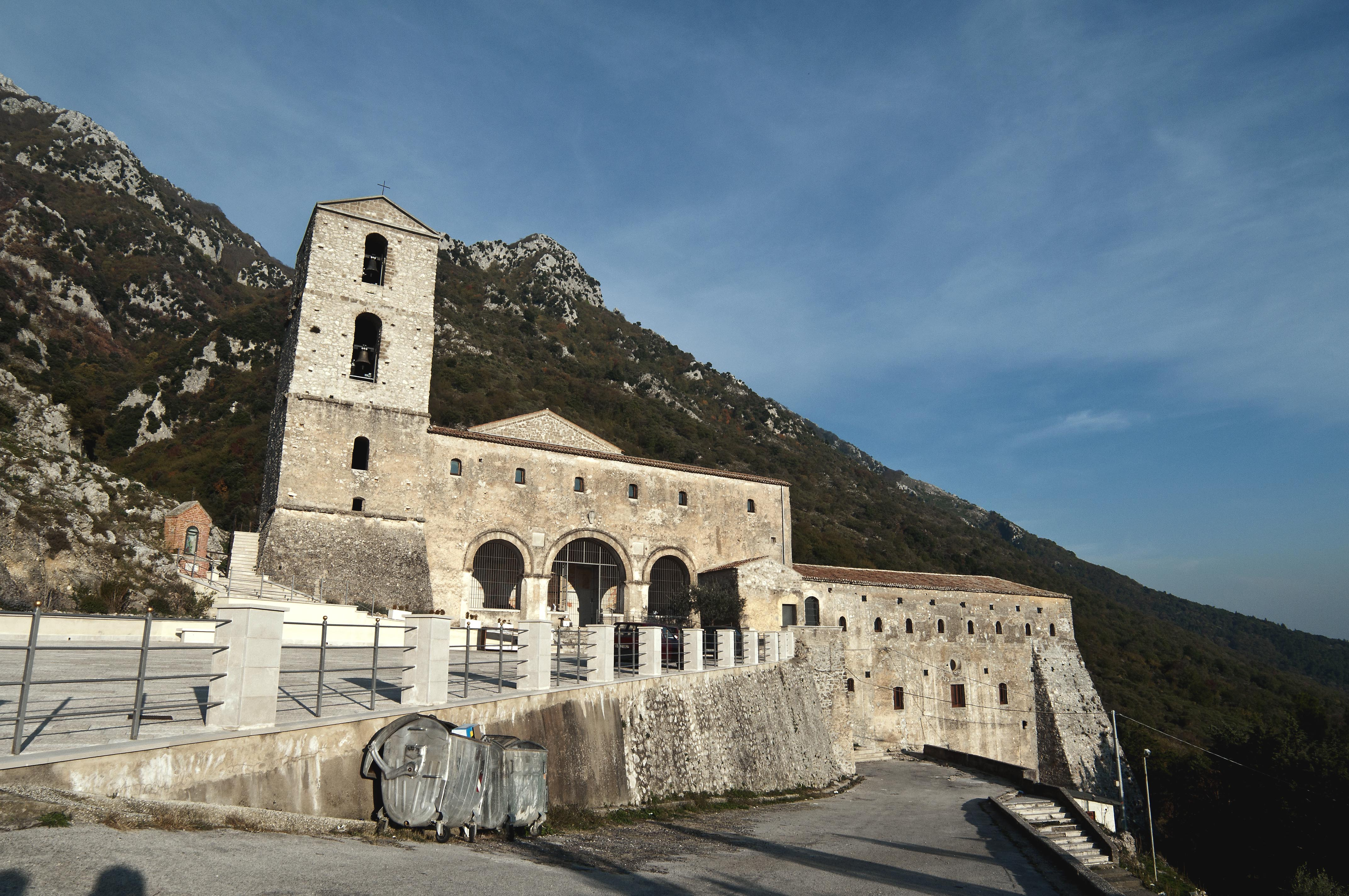
View of the sanctuary with the Taburnus on the background.

The Sanctuary of the Virgin of Taburnus (Italian: Santuario della Madonna del Taburno), also known as Sanctuary of Saint Mary of Mount Taburno (Italian: Santuario di Santa Maria a Monte Taburno), is a religious structure built at the end of the 15th century at the foot of Mount Taburno. It is located in the comune of Bucciano, in the province of Benevento of Southern Italy. For more than two hundred years it was used by Dominican friars.

== Location ==
The sanctuary is located in the territory of Bucciano, at an elevation of 544 metres above sea level, on the southern foothills of the Taburno Camposauro massif. Its position overlooks most of the Valle Caudina, and the structures composing it are surrounded by thick vegetation. Trails leading to three caves decorated with rock paintings start from the sanctuary.

== History ==
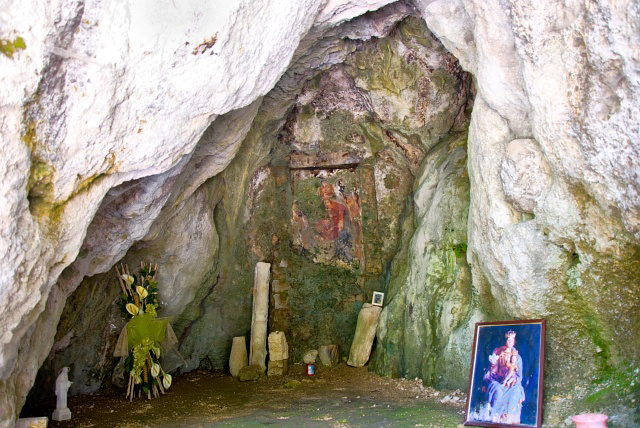
The cave with the remains of a painting of the Virgin Mary.

According to popular tradition, in 1401 a deaf-mute girl named Agnese, from the nearby town of Moiano, was herding sheep when a statue of the Virgin Mary located in a cave called her, asking to be moved to a better, nearby place. The Virgin Mary also returned hearing and speech to the girl. The news spread rapidly in the area, and Carlo Carafa, count of Airola, had a chapel built in the vicinity of the cave. The apparition of an effigy of the Virgin Mary was a common reason for the foundation of sanctuaries at the time.

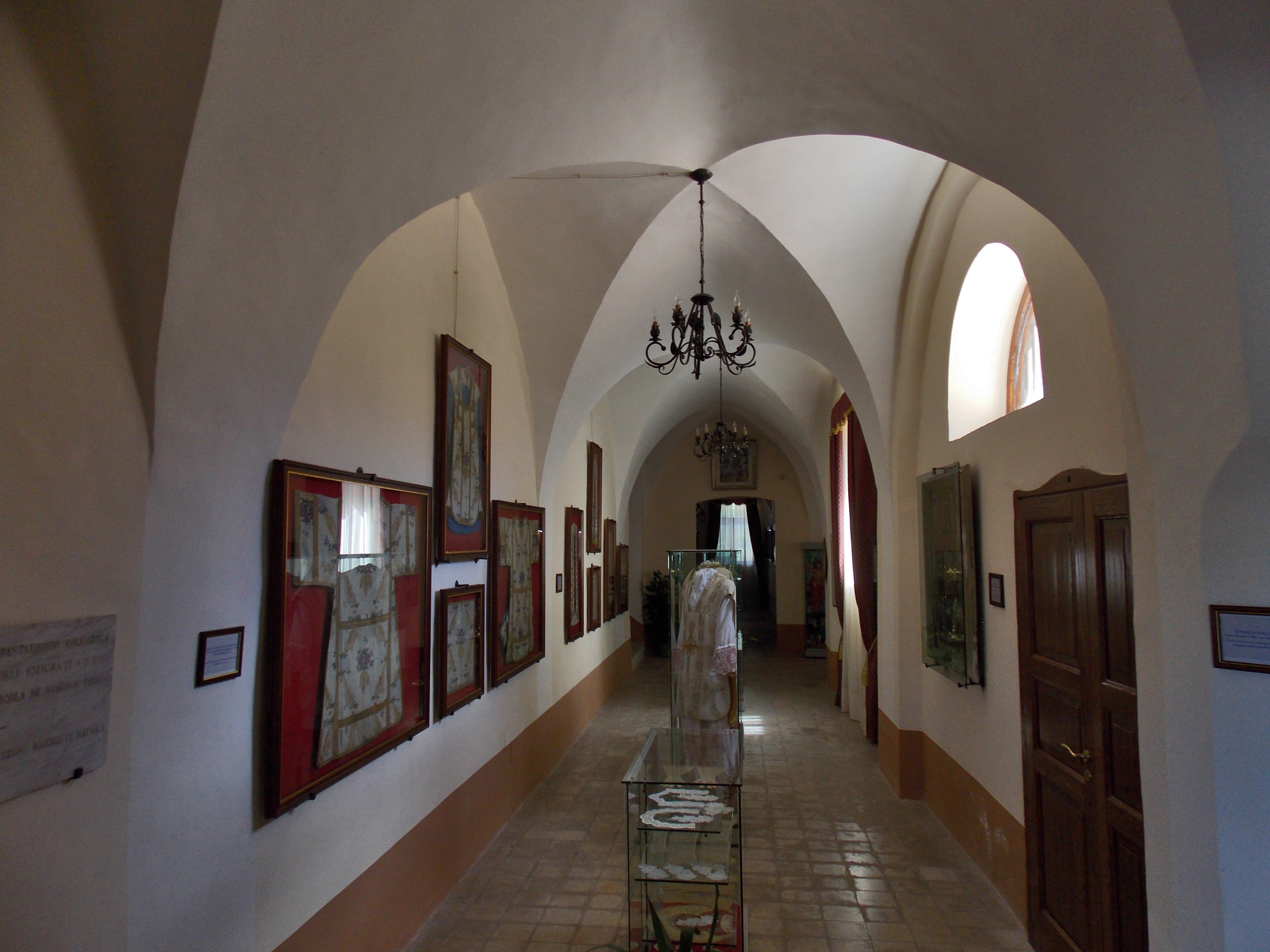
The cloister

In 1494 a convent was built by the grandchild of Carlo Carafa, at the time count of Airola and bearing the same name, both out of devotion, and because of the growing fame of the place, to ingratiate the devoted populace.^{p. 23}

The sanctuary was given to the Dominican friars in 1498. The prior of the convent acted as priest for the population leaving near the Fizzo source of Bucciano, and since 1571 the monks held the Corpus Domini procession by themselves. From 1669 to 1672 Vincenzo Maria Orsini, who later became Pope Benedict XIII lived in the convent.^{p. 26} The sanctuary became one of the most important religious centres in Campania.

In 1743 the monks decided to leave the monastery and move to a new one built near Airola, and the decision was approved in 1753 by Brancone, State Secretary of the Kingdom of Naples. The people of Moiano and Bucciano protested to Charles III of Spain and later, in 1779, to Ferdinand IV, arguing that the state of neglect claimed by the Dominicans was a mere need of maintenance, and that architectural elements had been taken from the sanctuary and used in the newly built convent. Ferdinand IV ordered the monks to celebrate mass daily at their own expense, but this did not stop the progressive decline of the structure.^{p.32}

=== Restoration efforts ===
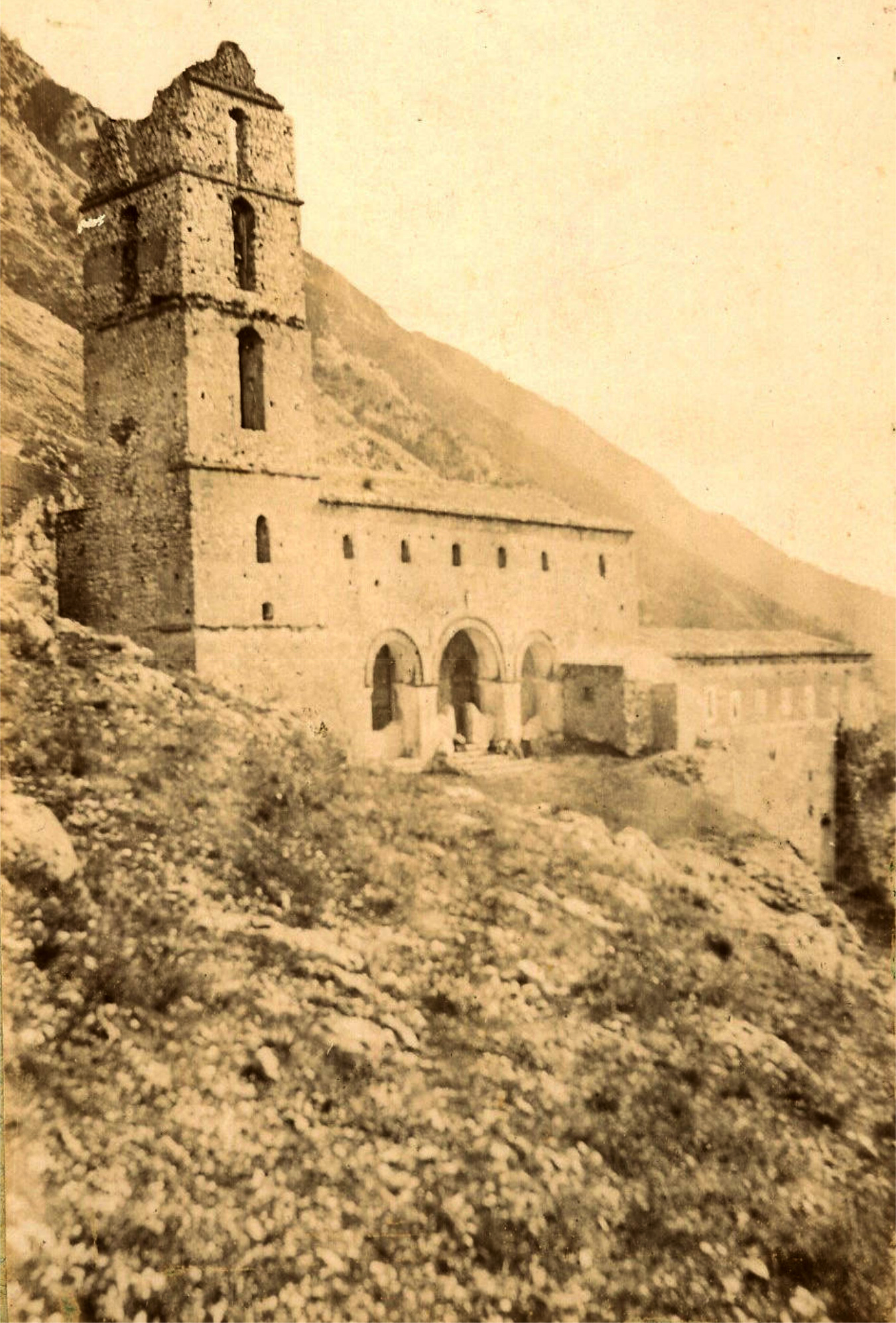
The church before restoration. The bell-tower is still on four levels.

In 1890 the priest of a Bucciano parish and the mayor of the town began promoting efforts to restore the sanctuary. Camillo Siciliano di Rende, archbishop of Benevento at the time, made the first solemn pilgrimage in 1891.^{p. 52} The following year structural reinforcement works were conducted, and further restorations occurred in 1925, with financial aid by Bucciano people who had emigrated to the United States.^{p.37} The sanctuary was damaged by the 1930 Irpinia earthquake, being again restored thanks to donations by migrants of the area, and by the 1980 Irpinia earthquake. After the latter, a new period of neglect started.^{p.39}

The bishop of the Diocese of Cerreto Sannita-Telese-Sant’Agata de’ Goti appointed in 1998, Michele de Rosa, pushed for a collaboration of his diocese, the parish and the comune of Bucciano for the recovery of the sanctuary. Along with the province of Benevento administration, the three parties restored several parts of the sanctuary at the beginning of the 2000s. The current church was inaugurated in November 2007.^{p. 42}

== Architecture ==
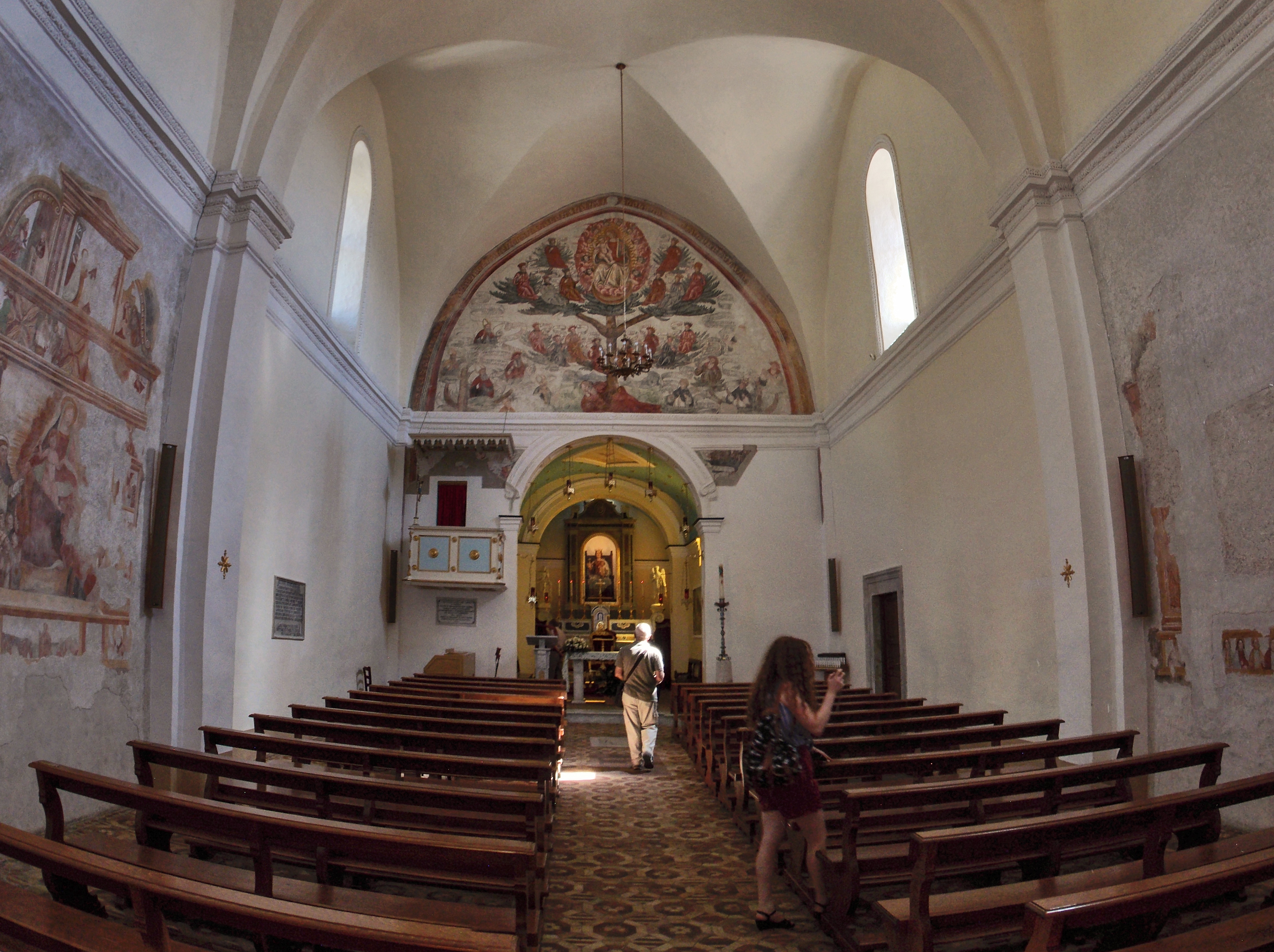
The inside of the church

In the anterior part of the structure there is a portico with three round arches, preceded by a wide limestone stairway. The bell tower once had four floors, but the last floor was demolished during restoration works. Near the buildings composing the sanctuary is the cave where the statue of the Virgin Mary was found.^{p. 61}^{p. 35}

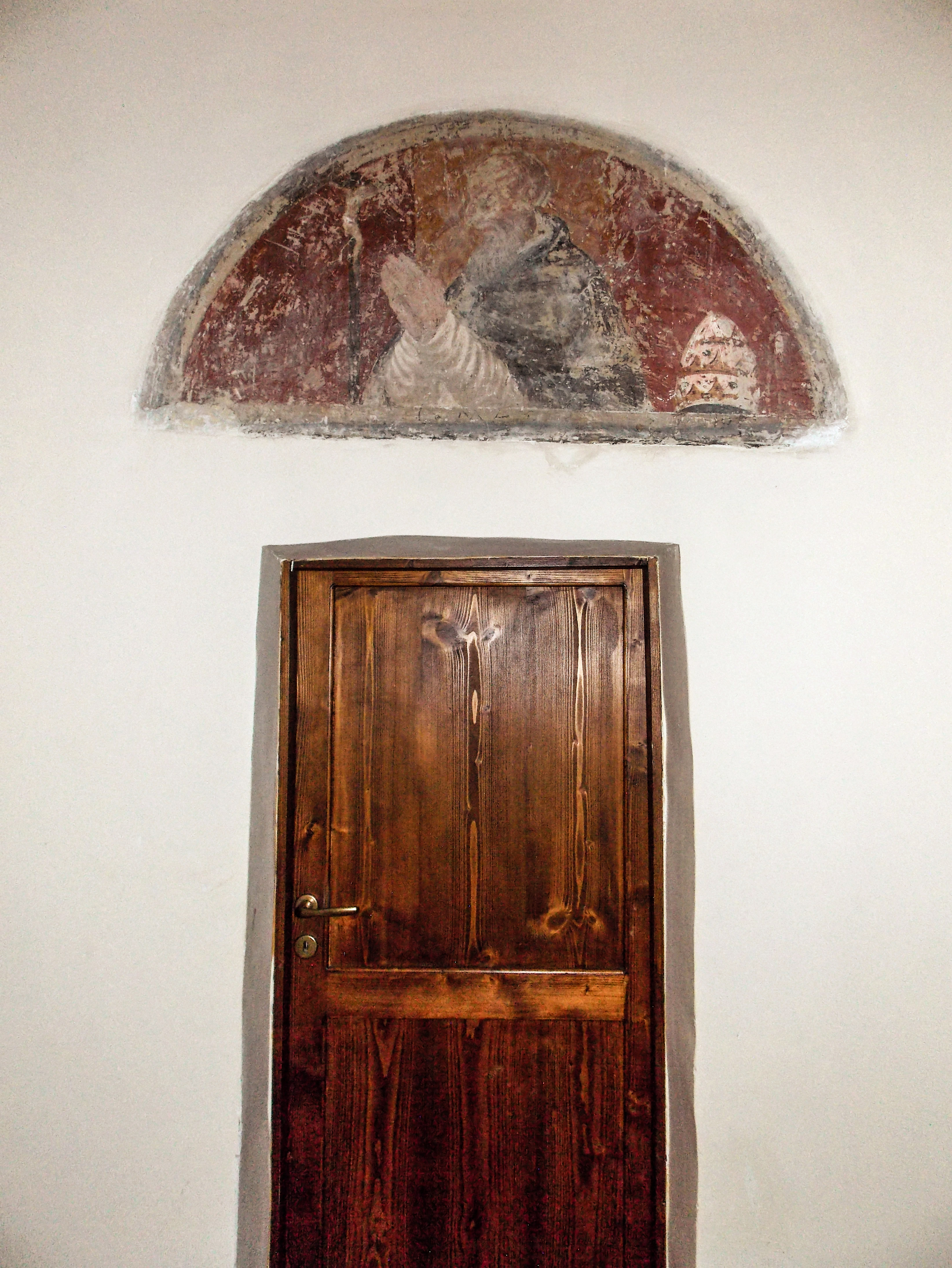
A cell door with a lunette depicting a Saint

The church has a rectangular nave, whose length is double its width. The ceiling has two gothic-style rib vaults, held by two pillars. The baked clay floor is the only remaining part of the original church, and is composed of octagonal paving stones of different colours. In the church there were five altars, but only the main one remains, having been restored according to records describing the original layout.^{pp. 32-35}^{p. 62}

The appearance of the cloister, located in the middle of the complex, has changed after restoration works. It used to be on two levels, but one has been closed and an oculus gives light to the lower floor. A wing of the cloister is now integral part of the convent, which is on two levels and is L-shaped. On its upper floor are the cells of the monks, upon whose doors are lunettes depicting different Dominican saints. The lower floor included the kitchen, the refectory and the water cisterns.^{pp. 32-35}^{p. 63}

== Devotion ==
The sanctuary is the main tourism draw of Bucciano, attracting Marian devotees from the surroundings. The main pilgrimage to the sanctuary is held on Divine Mercy Sunday. Due to the popularity of the sanctuary Pope Sixtus V allowed women to enter the sanctuary four times a year. To the sanctuary, and to the Virgin Mary effigies it holds, several prodigies are attributed. A group of deaf people from the region visits the sanctuary annually.
