= Taburno Camposauro =

Mountain in Italy

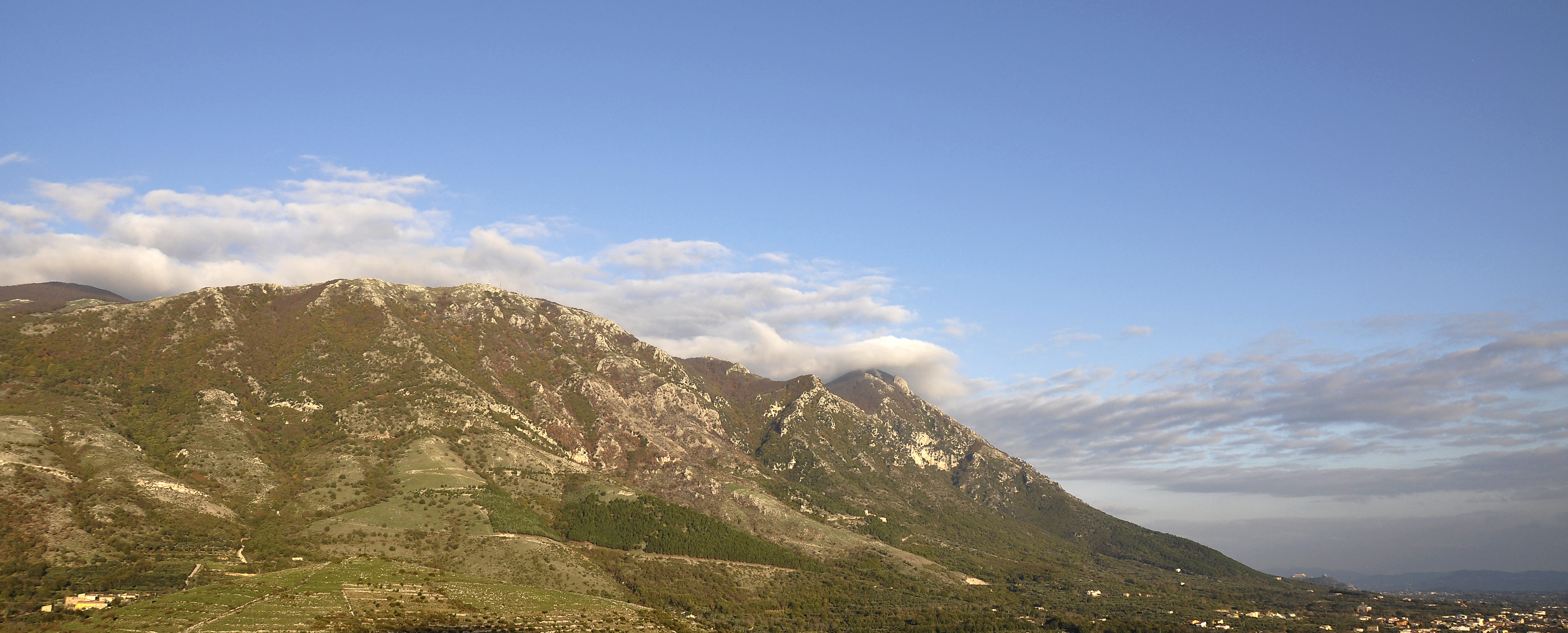

Highest point
- Peak: Monte Taburno
- Elevation: 1,394 m (4,573 ft)
- Prominence: 1,115 m (3,658 ft)
- Listing: Ribu
- Coordinates: 41°6′30″N 14°36′30″E

Geography
- Location within Italy
- Location: Province of Benevento, Campania, Italy
- Parent range: Campanian Apennines

Geology
- Rock age: Mesozoic

Taburno Camposauro is a massif located in the Apennines, to the west of Benevento, in the Campania region of Southern Italy. Its highest peak is the Taburno, at 1,393 m. It is composed of two groups of calcareous mountains separated by a plain. The fauna is affected by human activities, but the birdlife is very diverse. Several historical structures, mainly religious, are located on the massif. A DOC wine is produced in the area.

== History ==
The Romans knew the mountain by the name Taburnus. It lay in the Caudine part of the Samnium, near the location of the famous Battle of the Caudine Forks. The name seems to come from the Oscan language. The mountain was mentioned by Virgil in the Aeneid and in the Georgics, where he described it as "mighty". In his Cynegeticon, Gratius Faliscus described the mountain as "craggy".

Bands of brigands used the massif as a refuge and a base for their activities, especially immediately after the unification of Italy.

== Geography and geology ==
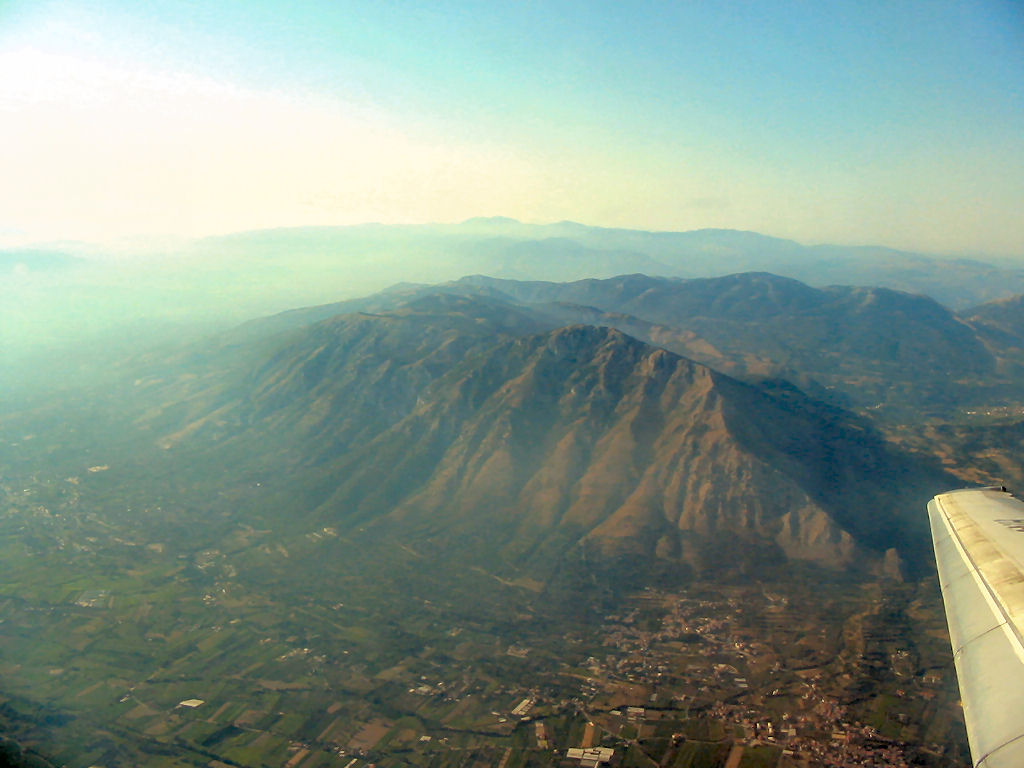
Aerial view of the massif, with the Taburno group in the foreground and Camposauro in the background.

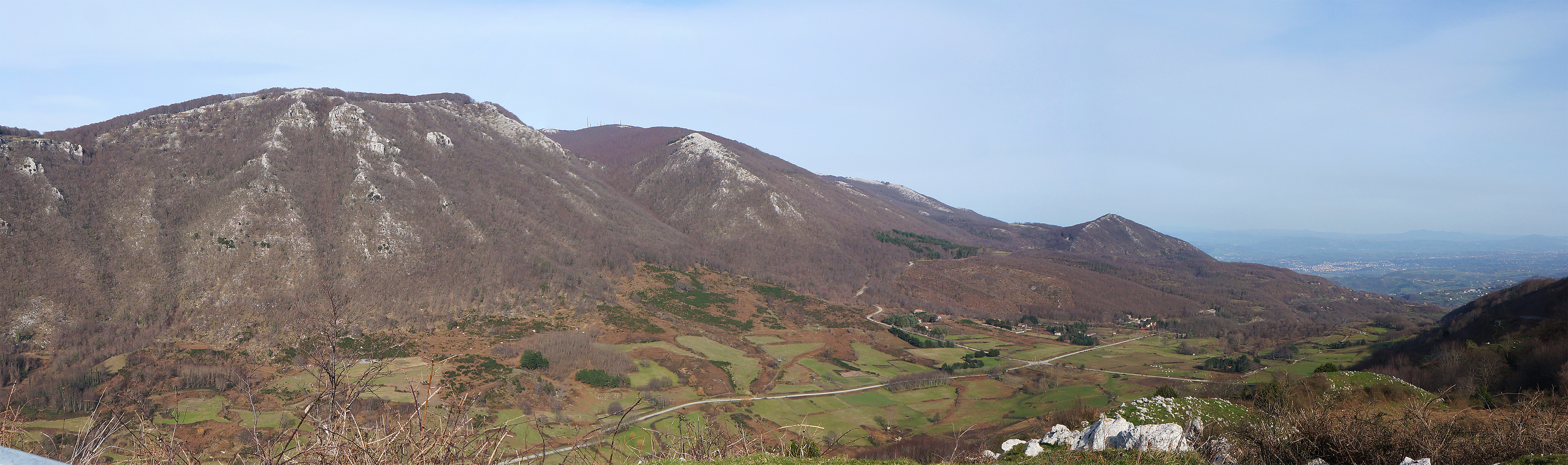
View of the Camposauro group from the Taburno, with the Prata Plain in the foreground.

Taburno Camposauro is an isolated calcareous massif in the Campanian Apennines whose formation dates back to the Mesozoic. It lacks superficial waters. Karst phenomena including hollows and caves are frequent on the massif. The southern slopes are much steeper and more craggy than the northern ones. Because of the type of clay and the fossil sand found there it is believed that in the mid-Pliocene there was a shallow sea in the area. The oldest limestone rocks in the province are found on the massif. At the foot of the southern group is the Fizzo source, that provides water to the Royal Palace of Caserta via the Aqueduct of Vanvitelli.

It is located west of Benevento, and it falls wholly within its province. It is composed of two groups of mountains, the Taburno in the south and the Camposauro in the north, separated by the Prata plain. The Valle Telesina separates the Taburno Camposauro from the Matese mountains, while the densely settled Valle Caudina separates it from the Partenio massif. The highest peaks are: Taburno (1393 m), Camposauro (1390 m), Alto Rotondi (1305 m), Gaudello (1226 m), Sant'Angelo (1189 m), and Pentime (1168 m), which are placed in a semicircle thus shaping the Vitulano Valley in the center.

Its territory is shared by fourteen comuni: Bonea, Bucciano, Cautano, Foglianise, Frasso Telesino, Melizzano, Moiano, Montesarchio, Paupisi, Sant'Agata de' Goti, Solopaca, Tocco Caudio, Torrecuso and Vitulano. The tallest peak is in the municipality of Bonea. Seen from Benevento the profile of the mountain resembles a sleeping woman; for this reason it is referred to as “Samnium’s sleeper” (la dormiente del Sannio). The massif is protected as part of the Regional Park of Taburno-Camposauro, which extends for 12,370 hectares, with a total population of about 25,000.

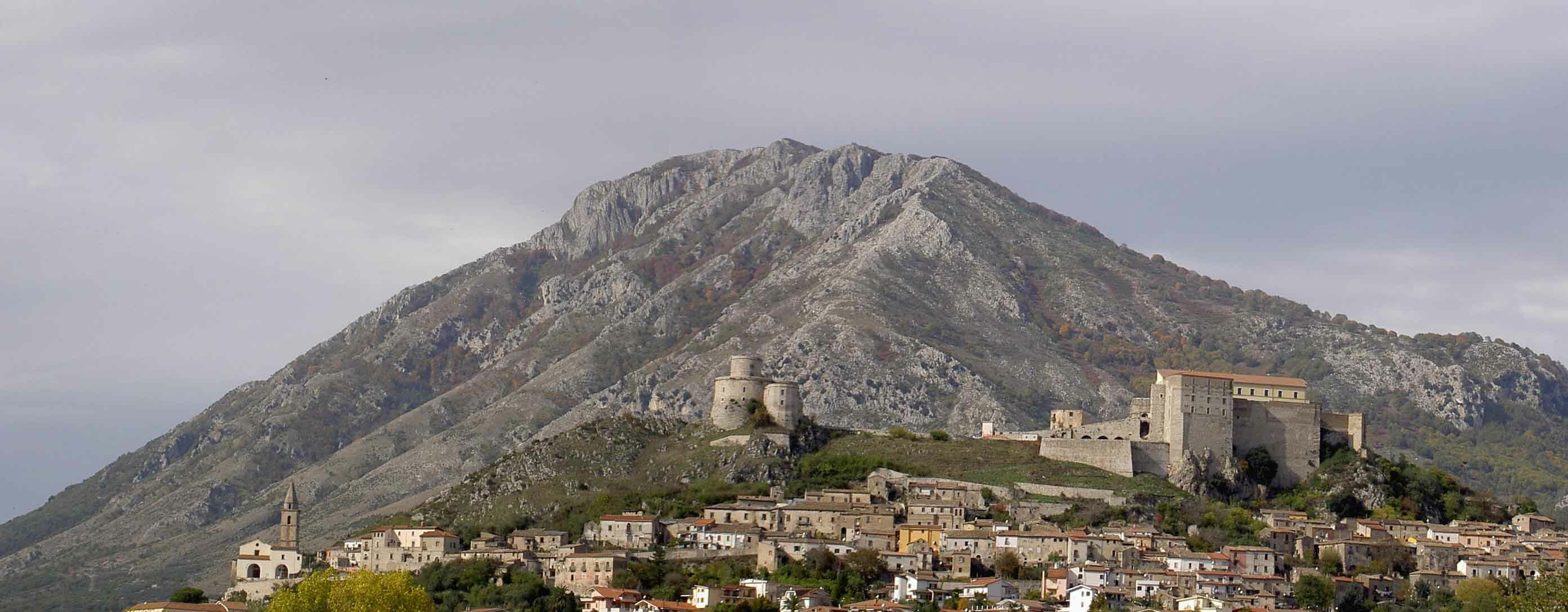
The rocky southern slopes of Mount Taburno with Montesarchio in the foreground.

== Fauna ==
The fauna of the massif is varied. Although the pressure from human activities led to the disappearance of rare species from the area, and the lack of water courses limits the variety of species, the Taburno Camposauro hosts the most diverse fauna in the province of Benevento, due to the many different environments. Because of this diversity, bird species are abundant: 94 have been observed, of whom 75 nesting species. The common raven, the common buzzard, the Eurasian nuthatch, redwings and several Passerine species can be seen on the massif.

Mammals are affected by human encroachment and extensive road infrastructure. Most common are rodents, bats, European hedgehogs, moles and foxes. The presence of wolves is uncertain: they are thought to pass through the area during their movements, but a stable population has never been observed. Hares and boars found on the massif were originally introduced for hunting reasons.

The number of amphibians is affected by the lack of water. The common toad and, more rarely, the European green toad can be found in the gullies, while near the springs at a lower altitude are the Italian tree frog and the Italian stream frog. The presence of two snakes is known, the four-lined snake and the Aesculapian snake, while several smaller reptiles inhabit the massif, among which are the Italian wall lizard and the gecko.

== Flora ==
Under 800 metres above sea level, the impact of human activities is strong, and the vegetation is mostly olive trees in the Taburno group and vineyards in the Camposauro group. Between 800 and 1000 metres of elevation the flora is mainly Fraxinus ornus, Carpinus orientalis, Ostrya carpinifolia and field elm. Above 1000 metres of elevation, the trees that dominate the Taburno are the European silver fir and the beech, accompanied by plants such as common holly and belladonna, while the Camposauro has a mixed woodland, with a prevalence of evergreen oak in the northwest and on the peak, and the presence of downy oak and maple on the northern slopes.

The European silver firs found on the Taburno were planted by the Bourbons around 1846, and are now part of the State-Owned Forest of Taburno (Foresta demaniale del Taburno), which extends for 614 hectares and hosts mostly beeches.

== Landmarks ==
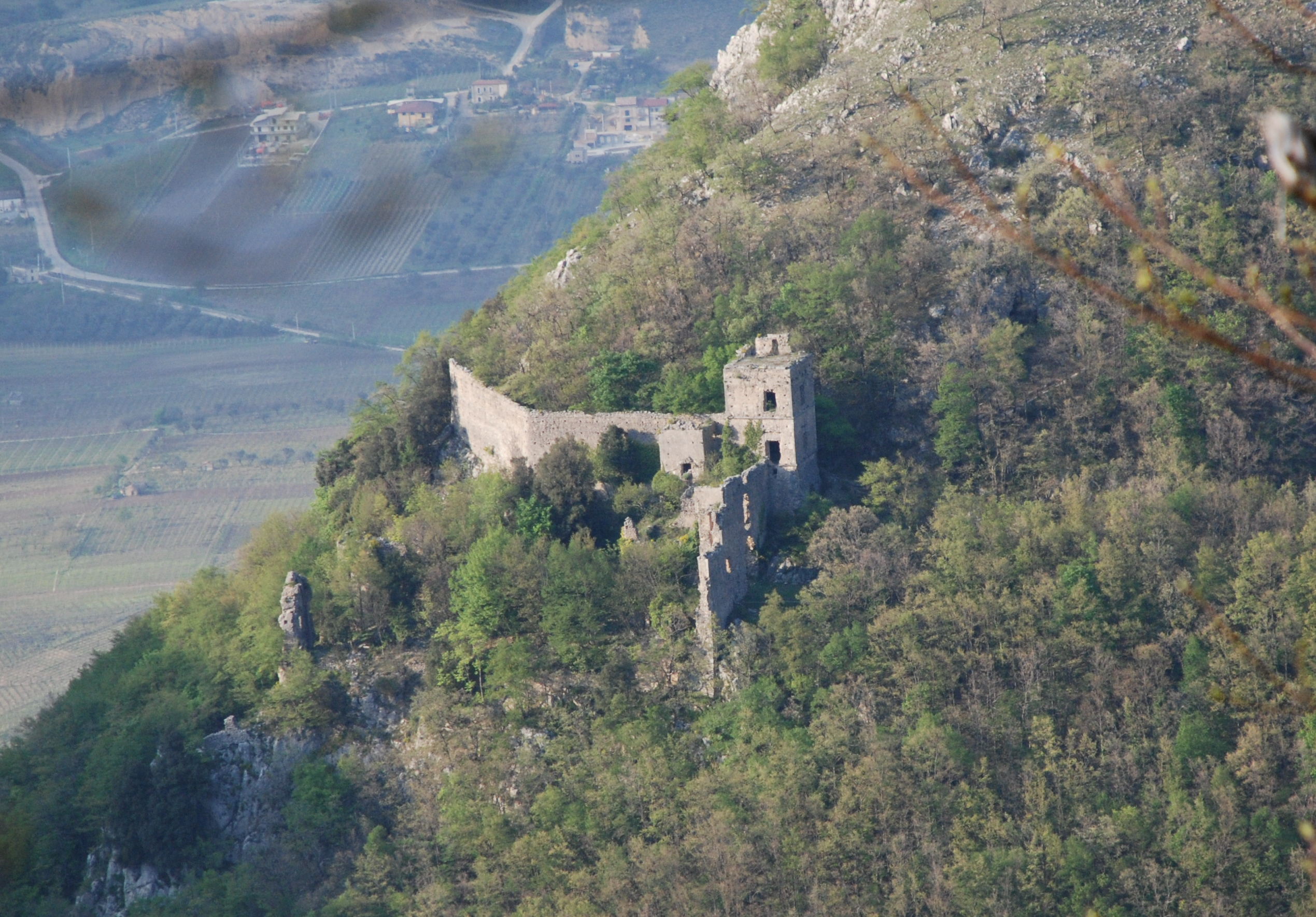
The Santa Maria in Gruptis abbey

The ruins of the abbey of Santa Maria in Gruptis are located in the Camposauro group, on the side of a gorge overlooking the Valle Telesina. It was founded in the 10th century and used by several monastic orders, before being deconsecrated in 1705.

On the southern slopes of Mount Taburno, in the comune of Bucciano, is the Sanctuary of the Virgin of Taburnus, built at the end of the 15th century and used by Dominican friars. The complex includes a church, a convent, a cloister and a bell-tower. After falling into disrepair, it was slowly restored starting in 1892.

In the Taburno group, there are the ruins of the Casina Reale, a hunting lodge used by the Bourbon royalty. The rocky southern mountainside hosts several caves, among which is Saint Simeon's cave, with frescoes dating back to 1600. In the northeastern part of the massif, high above Vitulano, is the Hermitage of Saint Mennas built in the 9th century. On the exact point of the tallest peak of the massif is a large cross with a CAI summit book.

== Wine production ==
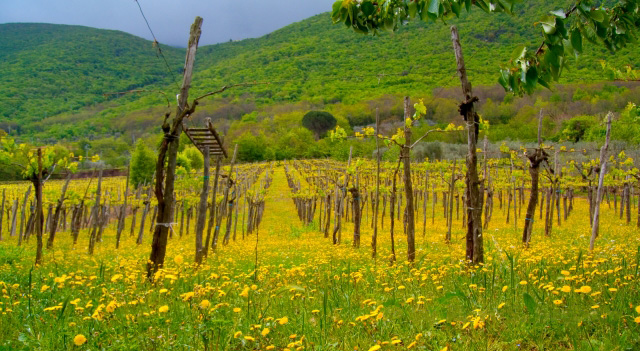
Vineyards in Solopaca, at the foot of the massif.

Italian wine, both red, white, rose and sparkling, under the Taburno DOC appellation comes from vineyards in the foothills around the mountains in Campania. Grapes destined for DOC production must be harvested up to a maximum yield of 13 tonnes/hectare, with the finished wines fermented to a minimum alcohol level of 11%. The Taburno DOC is currently a subzone of the Sannio DOC label.

Red and rose Taburno is a blend of 40-50% Sangiovese, 30-40% Aglianico with up to 30% of other grape varieties (both red and white), such as Barbera del Sannio, permitted to fill in the remainder of the blend. The whites are made from 40-50% Trebbiano, 30-40% Falanghina and up to 30% of other local white grape varieties. A sparkling spumante is produced under the Taburno DOC from a minimum 60% blend of Coda di Volpe and/or Falanghina with other local white varieties permitted to fill in up to 40% of the blend. Taburno wines labeled as Riserva must attain a minimum alcohol level of 12% and be aged for at least three years prior to release.
