= Forchia =

- Comune
- Comune di Forchia
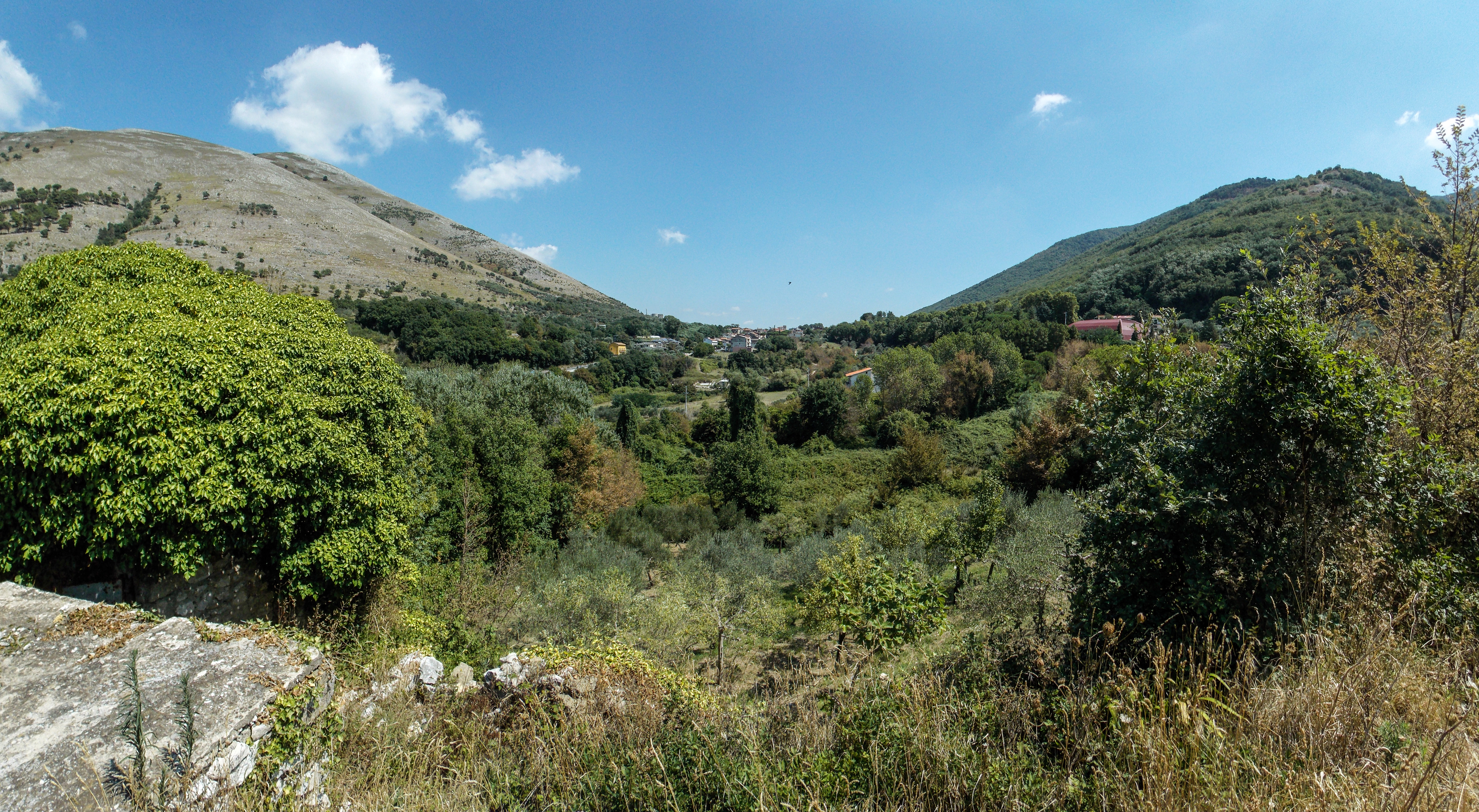

- Coat of arms

- Location within Italy Location within Campania
- Coordinates: 41°2′N 14°32′E
- Country: Italy
- Region: Campania
- Province: Benevento (BN)
- Frazioni: S. Alfonso, Cagni, Acquavitale, Signorindico

Government
  - Mayor: Margherita Giordano

Area
  - Total: 5.45 km^{2} (2.10 sq mi)
- Elevation: 282 m (925 ft)

Population (1 January 2020)
  - Total: 1,209
  - Density: 222/km^{2} (575/sq mi)
- Demonym: Forchianti
- Time zone: UTC+1 (CET)
  - Summer (DST): UTC+2 (CEST)
- Postal code: 82010
- Dialing code: 0823
- ISTAT code: 062032
- Patron saint: Nicholas of Myra
- Saint day: 6 December
- Website: Official website

Forchia is a comune (municipality) in the Province of Benevento in the Italian region Campania, located about 35 km (22 mi) northeast of Naples and about 25 km (16 mi) southwest of Benevento.

The name Forchia is the translation of Latin forculae, meaning "oxbow".

It borders the following municipalities: Airola, Arienzo, Arpaia, Moiano, Roccarainola.
