= Caudini =

The Caudini were a Samnite tribe that lived among the mountains ringing Campania and in the valleys of the Isclero and Volturnus rivers. Their capital was at Caudium, but it seems certain that the appellation was not confined to the citizens of Caudium and its immediate territory.

== Description ==
Livy speaks in more than one passage of the Caudini as a tribe or people, in the same terms as of the Hirpini, and Niebuhr supposed them to have been one of the four tribes comprising the Samnite confederacy. As the most western of the Samnite groups, they were the Samnite tribe most affected by the neighbouring Greeks of Campania. Together with the Hirpini, Pentri, and Caraceni tribes, the Caudini people were described as rustic, thriving on an agrarian economy mainly as massari (peasant farmers) and pecorari (herdsmen and shepherds).

The extent of their territory is unclear. The ancient poet Gratius Faliscus (Cyneget. 509) called the great mountain mass of the Taburnus the "Caudinus Taburnus", and this must have been at the center of their territory. It probably joined that of the Hirpini on the one side and of the Pentri on the other, while on the west it bordered immediately on Campania. But the name is not recognised by any of the geographers as a general appellation, and appears to have fallen into disuse: the Caudini of Pliny (iii. 11. s. 16) are only the citizens of Caudium.

The cities of the Caudini included Caudium (modern Montesarchio), Telesia (modern San Salvatore Telesino), Saticula (modern Sant'Agata de' Goti), Caiatia (modern Caiazzo), Trebula, and Cubulteria.

== Samnite Wars ==
The Caudini are nowhere mentioned as a separate tribe in our narratives of the Romans' Samnite Wars, probably because they were assumed included whenever the Samnites were mentioned. The territory of the Caudini was the scene of much fighting. This could be attributed to the tribe's location, which was the most westerly among the Samnites, hence, the most exposed to attacks by the Romans. Velleius Paterculus (ii. 1) says that it was with the Caudini that the Romans made their treaty following their defeat at the Battle of the Caudine Forks, where Livy uniformly talks of the Samnites. In 275 BC, the tribe was subjugated by L. Cornelius Lentulus, whose family henceforth took the name ‘Caudinus’. Caudini later revolted in 216. It is suggested that the tribe was encouraged to turn against the Romans after the arrival of Hannibal's army near Capua. During the Second Punic War, the Roman historian Livy reported Caudini's defection after the Roman defeat at Cannae.

== Sources ==
- E.T. Salmon (1967), Samnium and the Samnites, Cambridge U.P.
