= Arpaia =

- Comune
- Comune di Arpaia
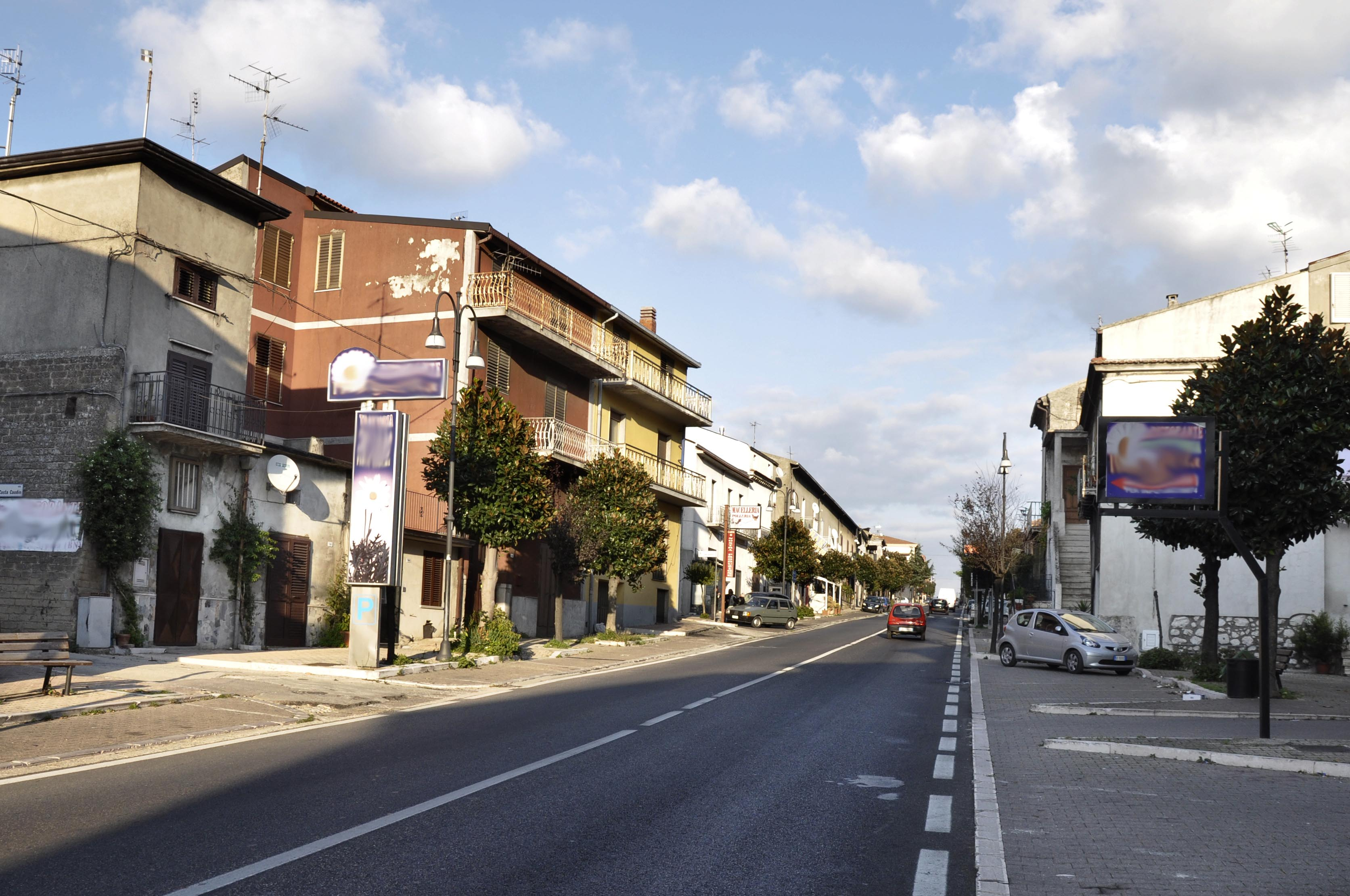

- Location within Italy Location within Campania
- Coordinates: 41°2′N 14°33′E
- Country: Italy
- Region: Campania
- Province: Benevento (BN)

Government
  - Mayor: Pasquale Fucci

Area
  - Total: 5.2 km^{2} (2.0 sq mi)
- Elevation: 283 m (928 ft)

Population (1 January 2020)
  - Total: 1,994
  - Density: 380/km^{2} (990/sq mi)
- Demonym: Arpaiuoli or Arpaioli
- Time zone: UTC+1 (CET)
  - Summer (DST): UTC+2 (CEST)
- Postal code: 82012
- Dialing code: 0823
- ISTAT code: 062005
- Patron saint: Our Lady of Graces; Saint Michael Archangel
- Website: Official website

Arpaia is a town, comune (municipality) and former (now titular) episcopal see in the Province of Benevento in the southern Italian region Campania, located about 35 km (22 mi) northeast of Naples and about 25 km (16 mi) southwest of Benevento.

Arpaia borders the following municipalities: Airola, Forchia, Paolisi and Roccarainola.

== History ==
Arpaia, rather than present-day Montesarchio, is considered to have been the seat of the ancient Diocese of Caudium (circa 400–600). The see was suppressed in 600, but in 1970 it was formally restored as the Latin Catholic titular see of Caudium.

== See also ==
- List of Catholic dioceses in Italy
- Caudium
- Battle of the Caudine Forks

== Sources and external links ==
- GCatholic - former & titular see = Caudium
