= Send under the yoke =

Ancient Italian ritual humiliation

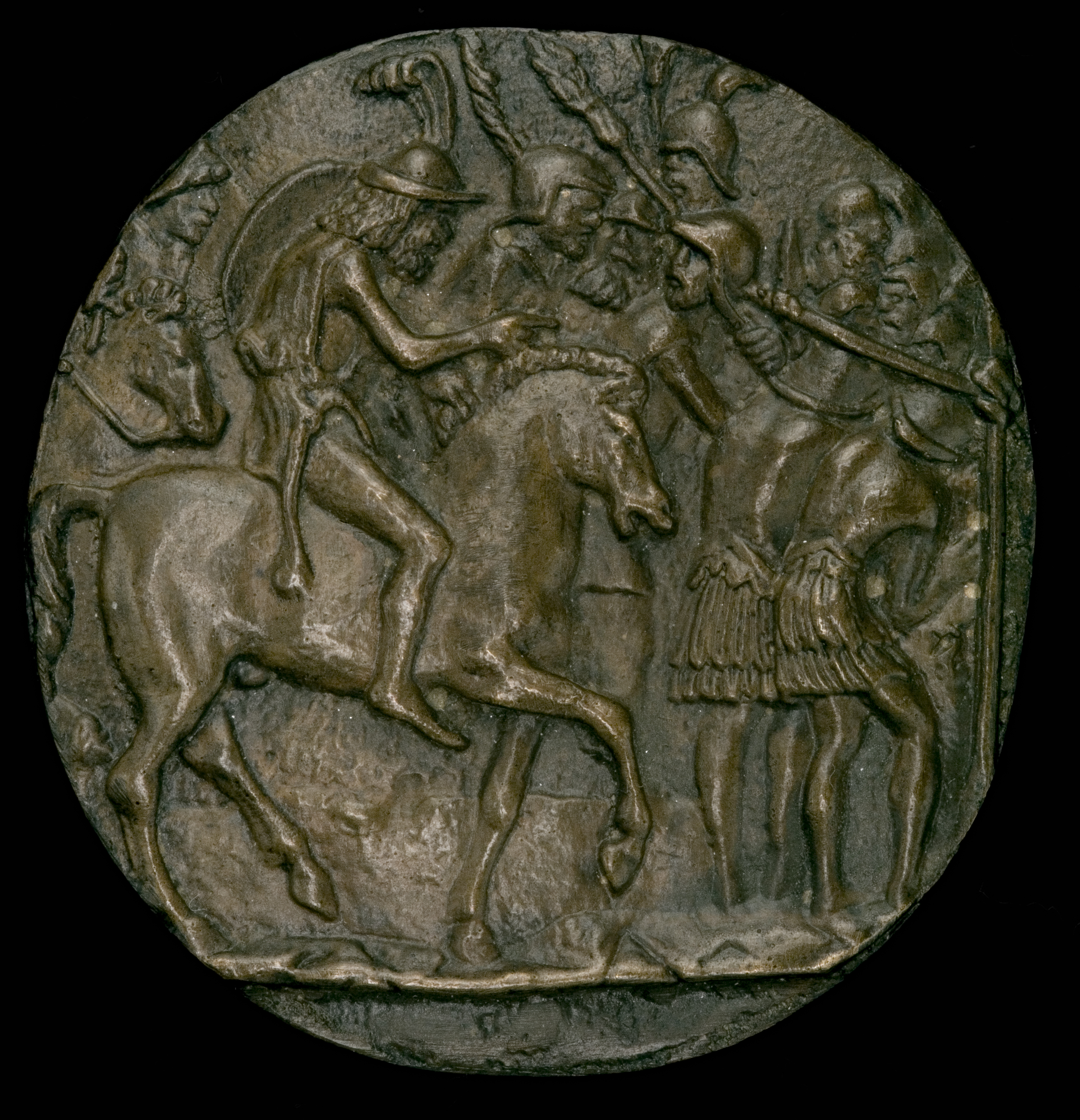
Medallion depicting the Romans being sent under the yoke by the Samnites (Pseudo-Melioli, c. 1500)

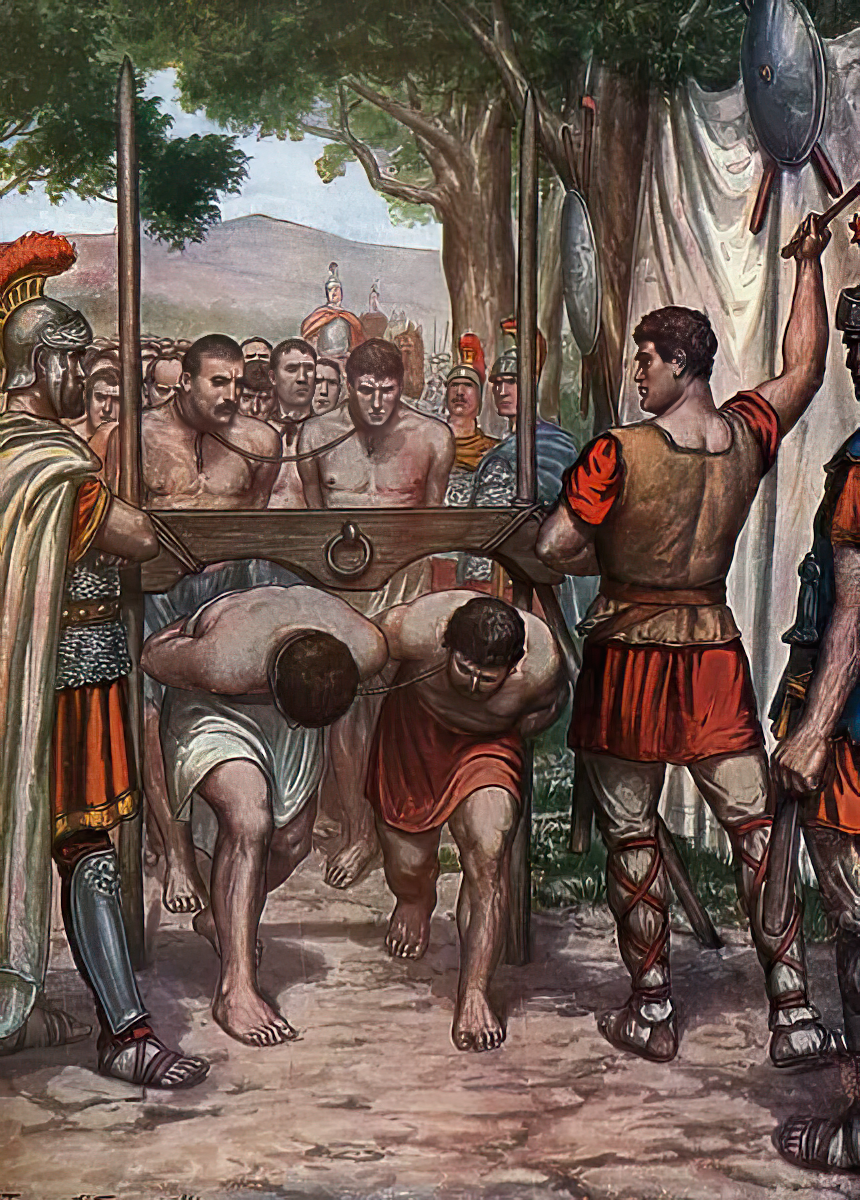
Illustration by Tancredi Scarpelli of the Romans being sent under the yoke.

To send (an enemy) under the yoke (Latin: sub iugum mittere) was a practice in ancient Italy whereby defeated enemies were made to pass beneath a yoke constructed of spears either to humiliate them or to remove blood guilt.

== History ==
The custom was a ritual humiliation of enemies practiced by the people of ancient Italy. Both the Romans and the Samnites forced the captives of their defeated enemies to pass under a yoke formed from spears.

The practice is said to have originated as a form of expiation. According to Livy, after the battle of the Horatii and Curiatii, Publius Horatius killed his own sister Camilla because she mourned the death of one of the Curiatii, to whom she had been betrothed, rather than her fallen brothers. In order to spare Horatius capital punishment and to allow him to remain within society, he was made to pass underneath a wooden beam as a form of atonement.

The early twentieth-century historian W. Warde Fowler identified this as a means of removing "taboo" (sacer) and therefore in order to release their enemies they were stripped and passed under the yoke. Perhaps the most recognizable case of passing under the yoke followed the defeat of the Romans by the Samnites in 321 BC at the Caudine Forks. Eventually the practice of passing under the yoke was no longer about ritual removal of "guilt", and instead was a means of humiliating defeated enemies.
