= Gaius Pontius =

Samnite military commander

Gaius or Gavius Pontius (fl. 321 BC) was a Samnite commander during the Second Samnite War. He is most well known for his victory over the Roman legions at the Battle of the Caudine Forks in 321 BC. He was eventually captured by Fabius Rullianus and executed.

== Early life ==
Gaius Pontius was born to the Caudini. He was a meddix, a Samnite position similar to a Roman consul or magistrate at the beginning of the Second Samnite War. He controlled a force of nearly 9,000, including nearly 1,000 cavalrymen. With this force, he won a series of early victories, which included taking the towns of Canusium and Gnaitha, and defeating the army under the command of Cornelius Lentulus. The Samnites failed to take advantage of these victories, however, and the Romans continued to press into Samnite territory.

== Battle of the Caudine Forks ==
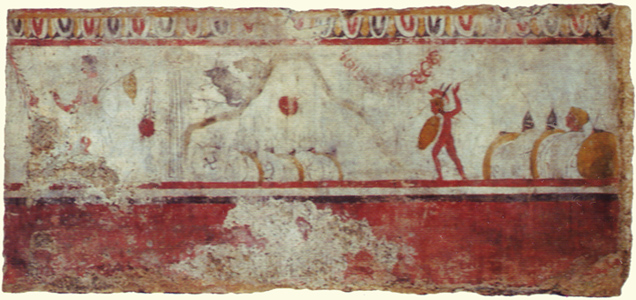
A Lucanian fresco of the Battle of the Caudine Forks.

In 321 BC, the Romans were moving into Samnium, and Pontius, who was encamped at Caudium, discovered that the army led by the Roman Consuls was near the town of Calatia. He devised a plan to trap the Roman army, and quickly sent ten shepherds to the Roman encampment. They told the Romans that the Samnite army was laying siege to the town of Luceria, in the region of Apulia.

The Romans fell for his trap, and found themselves cornered by the Samnite army in a narrow pass. They were forced to surrender to Pontius.

== Aftermath ==
As recorded by Livy, Pontius was confused as to what should become of the Roman army which had surrendered to him. He sent a letter to his father, the Samnite statesman Herennius Pontius, and the reply was that he should free them all, and therefore make Rome an ally. Pontius did not like this idea, and sent another letter to his father, saying so. Herennius, in a seemingly hypocritical manner, told his son to execute the entire army, saying that it would destroy the threat of Rome for a long time. Pontius knew that the number of Romans were simply too large to have them all executed, so he sent for his father in person, and asked him if there was a middle road. Herennius advised his son not to take that road, as it would not only humiliate the Romans, but leave them with the means to carry out revenge.

Pontius ended up ignoring his father's advice and forcing the Romans to walk under a yoke composed of Roman spears. This was supreme humiliation, as it was seen as cowardly for a Roman soldier to lose his spear, and the army went back to Rome smarting but intact.

Rome's revenge was swift, and ended up with the Samnites being soundly defeated, and Pontius being executed years after the battle.

== Sources ==
=== Primary ===
- Appian's History of Rome: The Samnite Wars (1)
- The Caudine Forks
- Livy's History of Rome: Book 9
- Livy: Periochae 11-15

=== Secondary ===
- Dench, Emma (1995-11-02). From Barbarians to New Men. Oxford University PressOxford. doi:10.1093/oso/9780198150213.001.0001. ISBN 978-0-19-815021-3.* The History of Rome by Theodor Mommsen
- Salmon, Edward Togo (1967). Samnium and the Samnites (Digitally printed version ed.). Cambridge: Cambridge Univ. Press. ISBN 978-0-521-06185-8. (originally published 1967)
