= Castello di Montesarchio =

Coordinates: 41.070142°N 14.641052°E

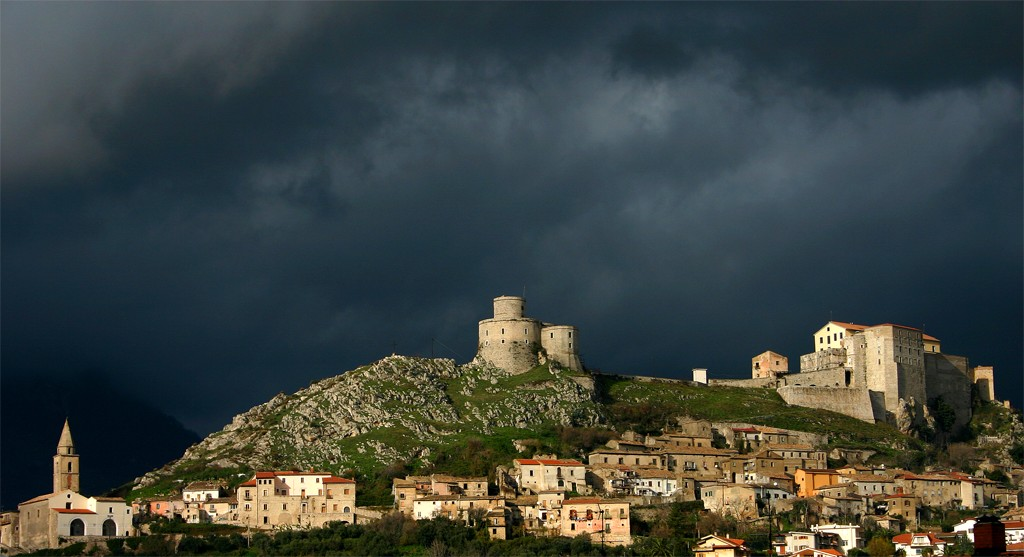
Tower on left, and castle on right, atop Monte Taburno.

The Castello di Montesarchio is a castle in Montesarchio in the province of Benevento, region of Campania, Italy. Since 2007, it houses an archaeologic museum of the region: the Museo Archeologico Nazionale del Sannio Caudino di Montesarchio.

== History ==
The castle is sited atop Monte Taburno, and had been the site of prior fortifications during the medieval period, including occupations by Lombards and Normans. The present structure was mainly erected during the Aragonese rule of the Kingdom. Following the Italian War of 1542-1546 between the Holy Roman Emperor Charles V and King Francis I of France, the castle was confiscated and given in 1532 to the Marquis of the Vasto, Alfonso II d’Avalos. In 1830, the castle was confiscated by the kingdom and turned into a prison. Among the famous mid-19th-century patriots jailed here were Carlo Poerio, Sigismondo Castromediano, Michele Pironti, and Nicola Nisco. The castle remained a prison until the end of the Second World War, and during the 1960s it served as an orphanage (Istituto Mater Orphanorum).
