= Bucciano =

- Comune
- Comune di Bucciano
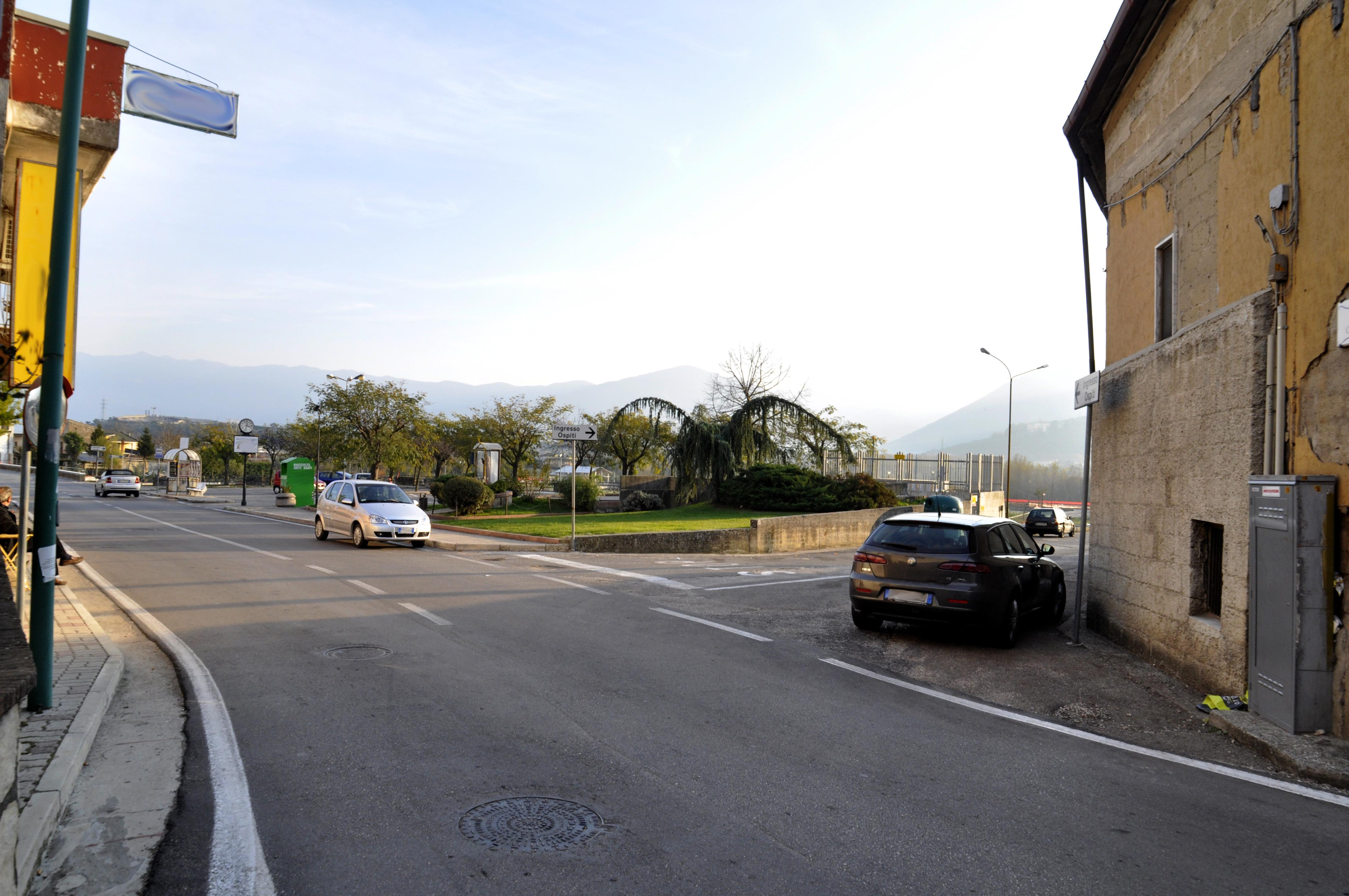
- A view of Bucciano

- Location within Italy Location within Campania
- Coordinates: 41°5′N 14°34′E
- Country: Italy
- Region: Campania
- Province: Benevento (BN)
- Frazioni: Pastorano

Government
  - Mayor: Domenico Matera

Area
  - Total: 7.94 km^{2} (3.07 sq mi)
- Elevation: 276 m (906 ft)

Population (1 January 2020)
  - Total: 2,072
  - Density: 261/km^{2} (676/sq mi)
- Demonym: Buccianesi
- Time zone: UTC+1 (CET)
  - Summer (DST): UTC+2 (CEST)
- Postal code: 82010
- Dialing code: 0823
- ISTAT code: 062010
- Patron saint: John the Baptist
- Saint day: June 24
- Website: Official website

Bucciano is a comune (municipality) in the Province of Benevento in the Italian region of Campania, located about 40 km (25 mi) northeast of Naples and about 20 km (12 mi) southwest of Benevento on the southern slopes of the Monte Taburno.

== History ==
Archaeological finds show the presence of an early settlement in the area dating back to pre-Roman times. Early documents mentioning Bucianus date back to 1326. Bucciano was part of the nearby town of Airola until the end of feudalism in the late 19th century. Afterwards, Bucciano became an independent town and part of the province of Benevento after the unification of Italy.

== Main sights ==
The Caroline Aqueduct, designed by 18th-century Italian engineer and architect Luigi Vanvitelli, collects the natural spring water of the nearby Fizzo River and passes through Bucciano as it channels the water some 38 kilometers towards the Royal Palace of Caserta.

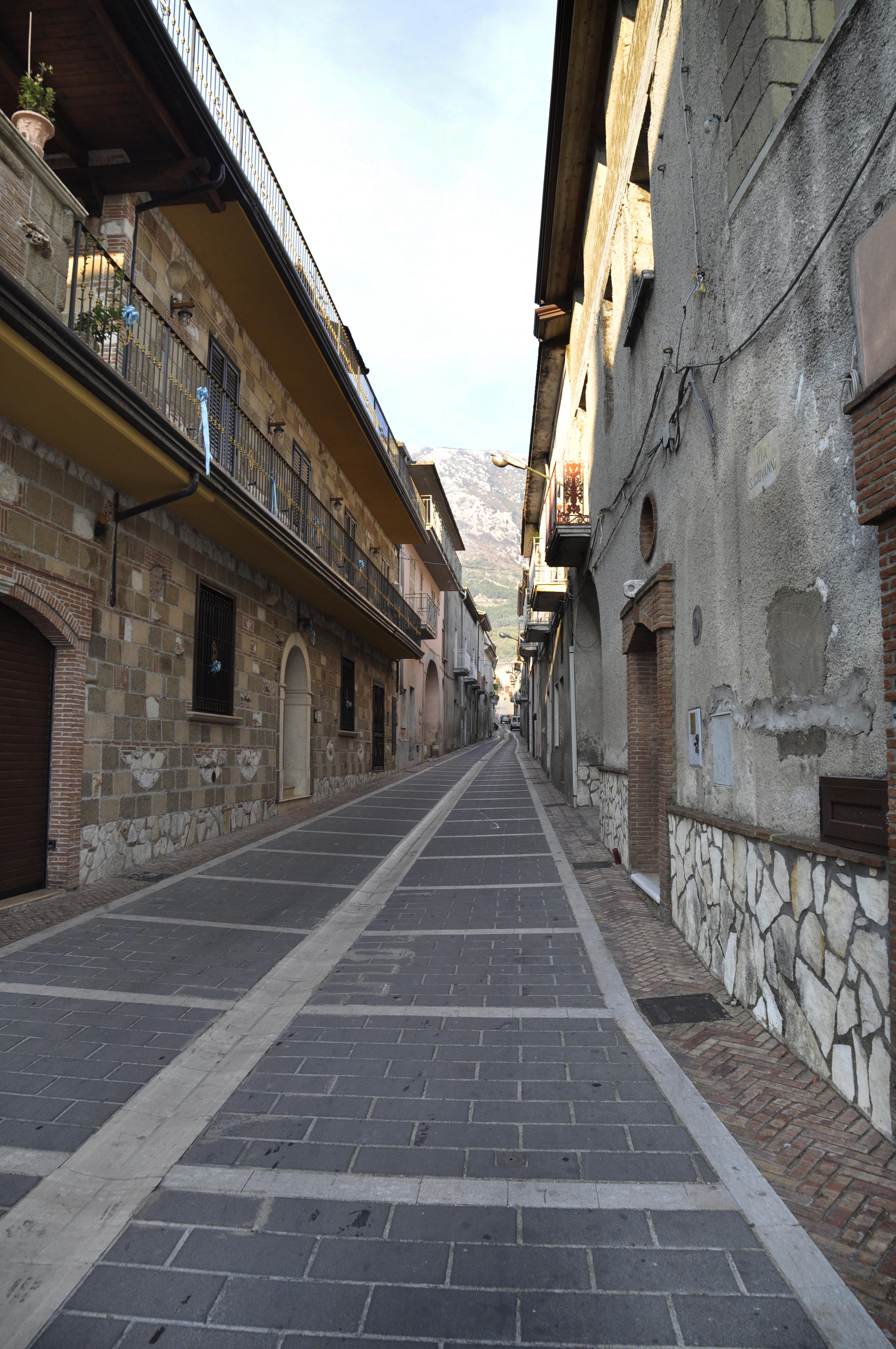
A street in Bucciano, with Mount Taburnus on the background

The Church of San Giovanni Battista and the Sanctuary of Santa Maria of Monte Taburno are two historic churches located in the town. The latter of these churches was built on the slopes of Mount Taburno in the fifteenth century after tales of a miraculous healing of a deaf-mute shepherd who found a statue of the Virgin Mary in a nearby cave. The sanctuary was the site of a convent of Dominican friars from 1498 to 1743.

== Economy ==
Bucciano's economy is mostly based on agriculture, mostly the production of cereal, wheat, olive oil, wine, mulberries, maize and legumes. The total land used for agriculture in 2000 was 258 hectares (640 acres) according to a 2007 report by the Benevento chamber of commerce.
