= Caudium =

Ancient city of the Samnites

Coordinates: 41°03′40″N 14°38′00″E

Caudium (modern Montesarchio) was the main city of the ancient Caudini tribe in Samnium situated on the Appian Way between Beneventum (modern Benevento) and Capua, in what is now southern Italy. It was 21 Roman miles from Capua, and 11 from Beneventum. It, or nearby Arpaia, became the seat of an early bishopric, which is now a Latin Catholic titular see.

== History ==
In early times it was an important site, either the capital or chief city of the Caudini. Grave goods, found in the necropolis nearby, show that the site was inhabited from the 8th to the 3rd centuries.

Caudium is first mentioned during the Second Samnite War, when in 321 BC the Samnite army under Gaius Pontius encamped there just before their great victory over the Romans in the nearby mountain pass called the Caudine Forks (Livy 9.2), whose exact location is disputed. A few years later, the Samnites used Caudium as a place from which to watch the Campanians (Liv. 9.27).

Caudium is not mentioned during the Second Punic War, but the Caudini are repeatedly mentioned. Niebuhr supposed that the city was destroyed by the Romans in revenge for their great defeat at the Caudine Forks, but there is no evidence for this, and in a later period it was known as a stopping place along the Appian Way, both in the time of Augustus (Hor. Sat. 1.5.51; Strabo 5. p. 249) and in the late empire.

In the triumviral period Caudium received a colony of veterans; and it appears from Pliny, as well as from inscriptions, that it retained its municipal character, though deprived of a large portion of its territory in favor of the neighboring city of Beneventum. (Plin. iii. 11. s. 16; Lib. Colon. p. 232; Orelli, Inscr. 128, 131.)

The period of its destruction is unknown: the name is still found in the 9th century, but it is uncertain whether the town still existed at that time.

== Ecclesiastical history ==
The ancient bishopric of Caudium is considered to have had its seat at what is now the village of Arpaia rather than at present-day Montesarchio.

Felicissimus, in 496, is the only ancient bishop of the see whose name is known. In the 10th century its territory became part of the diocese of Sant'Agata de' Goti.

The diocese of Caudium was nominally restored in 1970 by the Catholic Church as Latin titular bishopric. of Caudium (Latin) / Arpaia (Curiate Italian) / Caudin(us) (Latin adjective).

== See also ==
- List of Catholic dioceses in Italy

== Bibliography ==
- E.T. Salmon (1967), Samnium and the Samnites, Cambridge U.P.
- G. D'Henry (1967), Enciclopedia dell'arte antica, classica e orientale, Suppl. (1967), pp. 193–195

Ecclesiastical history

- Gaetano Moroni, Dizionario di erudizione storico-ecclesiastica, vol. 10, p. 283
- Francesco Lanzoni, Le diocesi d'Italia dalle origini al principio del secolo VII (an. 604), vol. I, Faenza 1927, p. 186
