= Isclero =

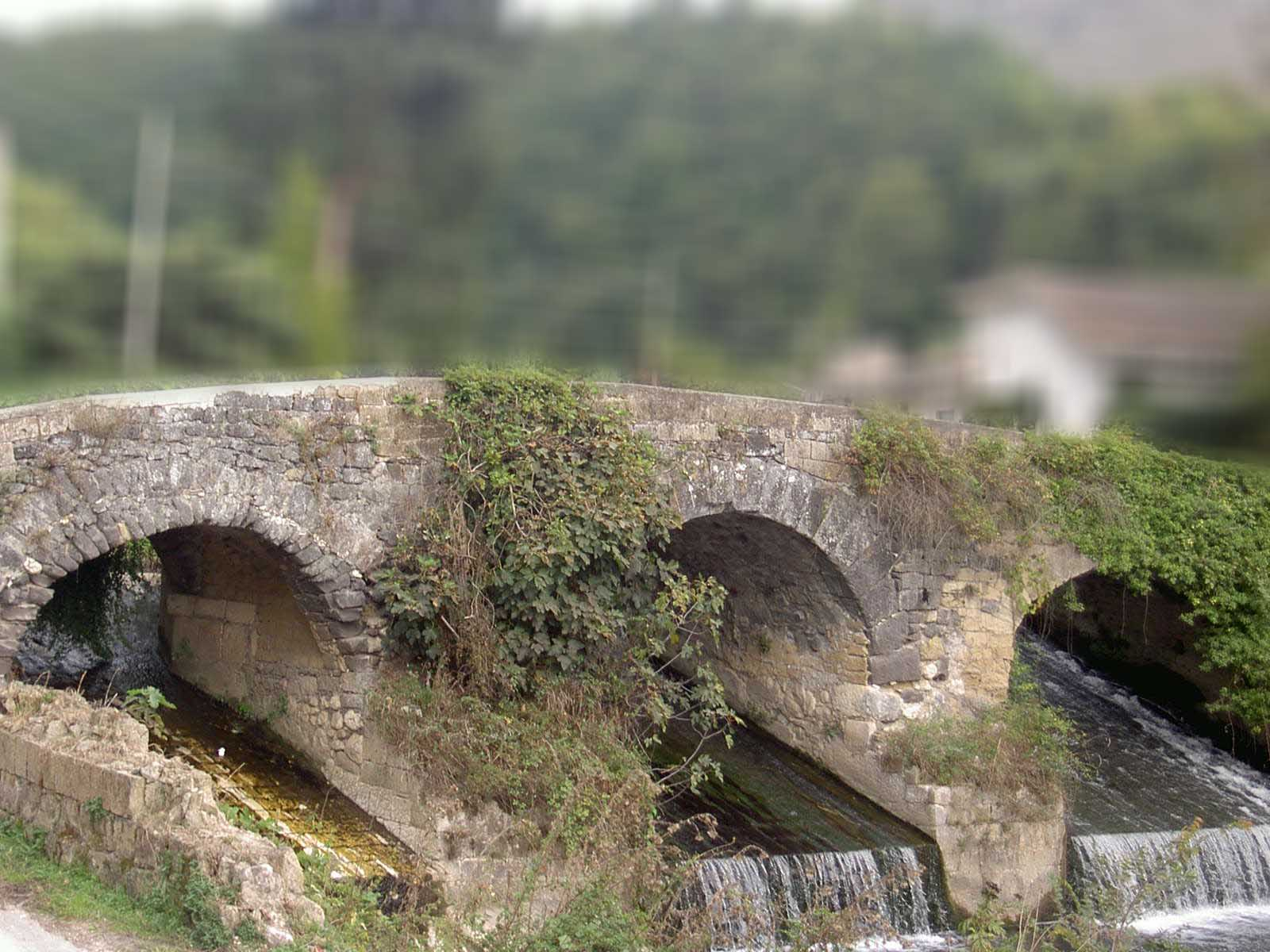

Location
- Country: Italy

Physical characteristics
- Source
  - location: Between Cima Recuorvo and Monte Pizzone, Campanian Apennines
- Mouth: Volturno
  - coordinates: 41.1346°N 14.4199°E
- Length: 30 km (19 mi)

Basin features
- Progression: Volturno→ Tyrrhenian Sea

The Isclero is a stream in Campania, southern Italy.

Its source is formed by confluence of the Varco, Cola and Querci torrents; it then flows in the Valle Caudina, where it receives the waters of the Tesa and Faenza, and then continues running in the Moiano ravine and, subsequently, in the territory of Sant'Agata de' Goti.

The Isclero flows into the Volturno near Limatola.

== See also ==
- Caudine Forks, located near the Isclero's sources
