= Tocco Caudio =

- Comune
- Comune di Tocco Caudio
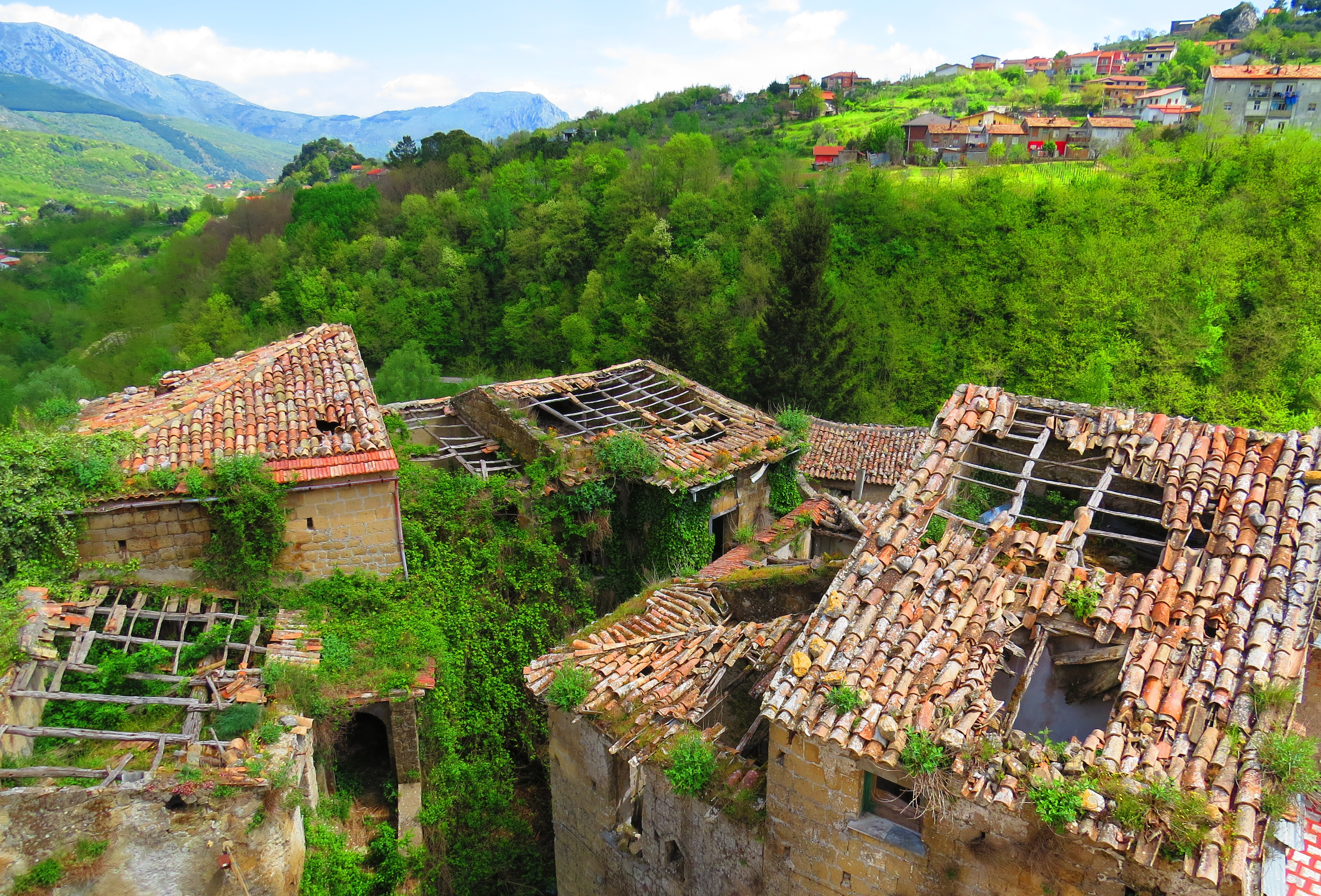

- Coat of arms

- Location within Italy Location within Campania
- Coordinates: 41°8′N 14°38′E
- Country: Italy
- Region: Campania
- Province: Benevento (BN)

Government
  - Mayor: Gennaro Caporaso

Area
  - Total: 27.2 km^{2} (10.5 sq mi)
- Elevation: 540 m (1,770 ft)

Population (1 January 2017)
  - Total: 1,534
  - Density: 56.4/km^{2} (146/sq mi)
- Demonym: Tocchesi
- Time zone: UTC+1 (CET)
  - Summer (DST): UTC+2 (CEST)
- Postal code: 82030
- Dialing code: 0824
- Patron saint: Saints Cosmas and Damian
- Saint day: 27 September
- Website: Official website

Tocco Caudio is a village and comune in the province of Benevento, in the Campania region of southern Italy. The old town was abandoned after a series of earthquakes in 1980 and 1981.

== Geography ==
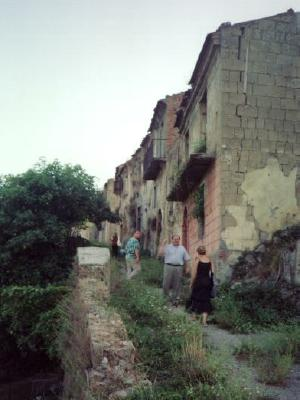
People explore the ghost town.

As with many ancient Longobard towns in this mountainous region of southern Italy, Tocco Caudio was built on a promontory ridge. Tocco Caudio's ridge is fairly small and somewhat isolated. This arrangement made the town easily defensible, while having ready access to ridge-top roads along which a traveller would not need to cross any rivers. Also, as was typical with medieval development, the town is fairly compact with narrow streets.

== History ==
In 1962, 1980 and 1981, earthquakes damaged much of the old historical center of Tocco Caudio. Rather than attempt to rebuild the historic town, the citizens opted to completely abandon it and resettle around the ridge. Today there are essentially two Tocco Caudio: an empty ghost town and a new relocated town aside, in a location called Friuni.

== People ==
- Nicola Sala, composer and theoretist
- Carlo Coppolaro, composer and critic
- Carmen Valacchio, nuclear research
