= Montesarchio =

Montesarchio Muntesarchio (Neapolitan)
- Comune
- Città di Montesarchio
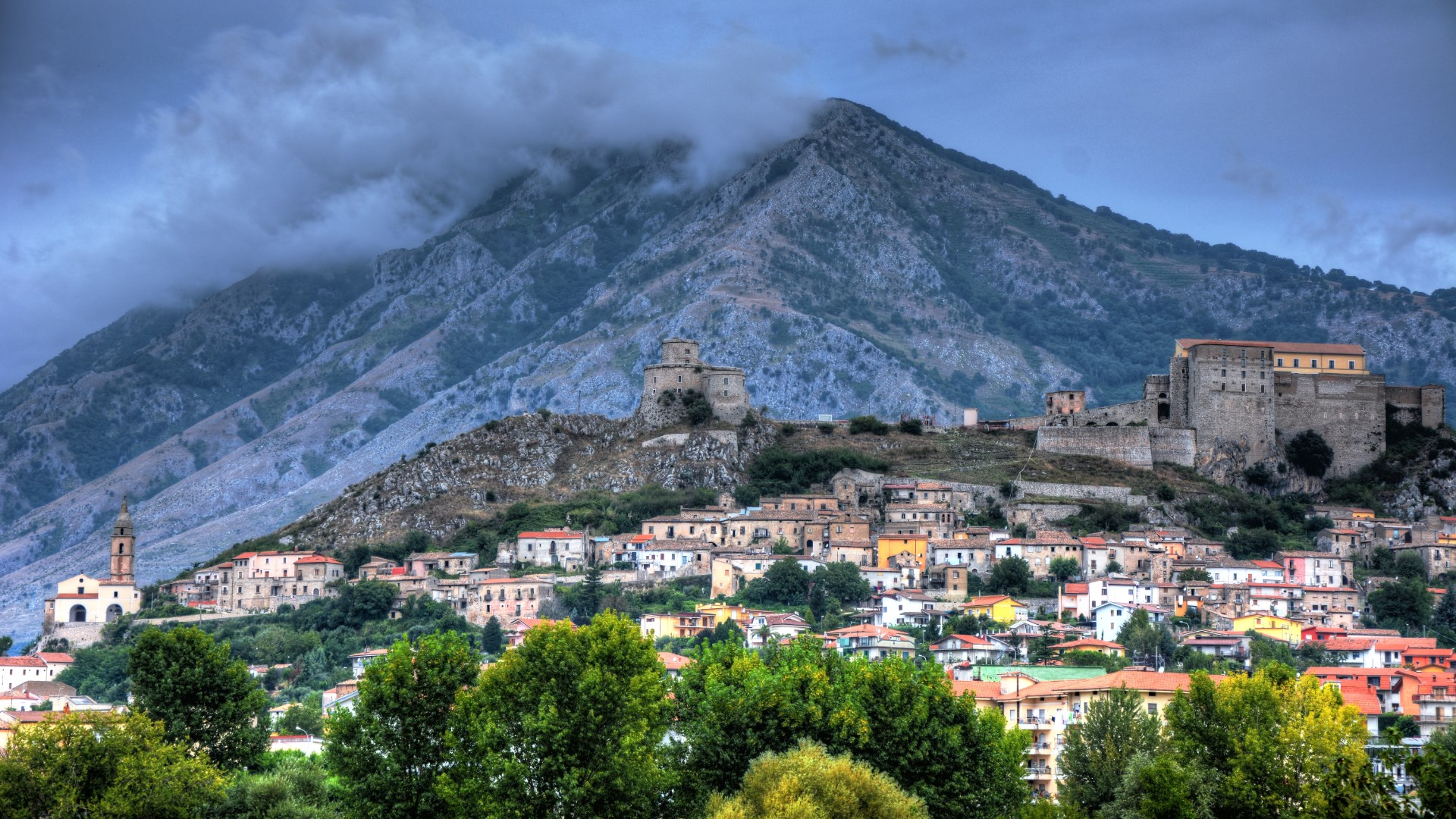
- View of the hamlet Latonuovo with the Tower and the Castle, and Monte Taburno on the background

- Coat of arms

- Location within Italy Location within Campania
- Coordinates: 41°3′40″N 14°38′0″E
- Country: Italy
- Region: Campania
- Province: Benevento (BN)
- Frazioni: Varoni, Cirignano, Tufara Valle

Government
  - Mayor: Carmelo Sandomenico

Area
  - Total: 26.51 km^{2} (10.24 sq mi)
- Elevation: 300 m (980 ft)

Population (1 January 2020)
  - Total: 13,226
  - Density: 498.9/km^{2} (1,292/sq mi)
- Demonyms: Montesarchiesi; Sarchiesi
- Time zone: UTC+1 (CET)
  - Summer (DST): UTC+2 (CEST)
- Postal code: 82016
- Dialing code: 0824
- ISTAT code: 062043
- Patron saint: Saint Nicholas
- Saint day: 6 December
- Website: Official website

Montesarchio (Neapolitan: Muntesarchio; Latin: Caudium; Ancient Greek: Καύδιον, romanized: Kaúdion) is a comune in the Province of Benevento, Campania, Southern Italy. It is located 18 kilometres (11 miles) southwest of Benevento in the Valle Caudina at the foot of Monte Taburno. The commune was granted the official status of city (città) by a presidential decree of 31 July 1997. In 2020, it had a population of 13,226. It is one of I Borghi più belli d'Italia ("The most beautiful villages of Italy").

== History ==
=== Ancient era ===
Montesarchio is the site of ancient Caudium, an ancient city of Apulia et Calabria, situated on the road from Beneventum (modern Benevento) to Capua. It seems probable that it was in early times a place of importance, and the capital or chief city of the tribe called the Caudini; but it bears only a secondary place in history. It is first mentioned during the Second Samnite War, 321 BCE, when the Samnite army under Gaius Pontius encamped there, previous to the great disaster of the Romans in the neighbouring pass known as the Caudine Forks; and again, a few years later, as the headquarters occupied by the Samnites, with a view of being at hand to watch the movements of the Campanians. The town of Caudium is not mentioned during the Second Punic War, though the tribe of the Caudini is repeatedly alluded to.

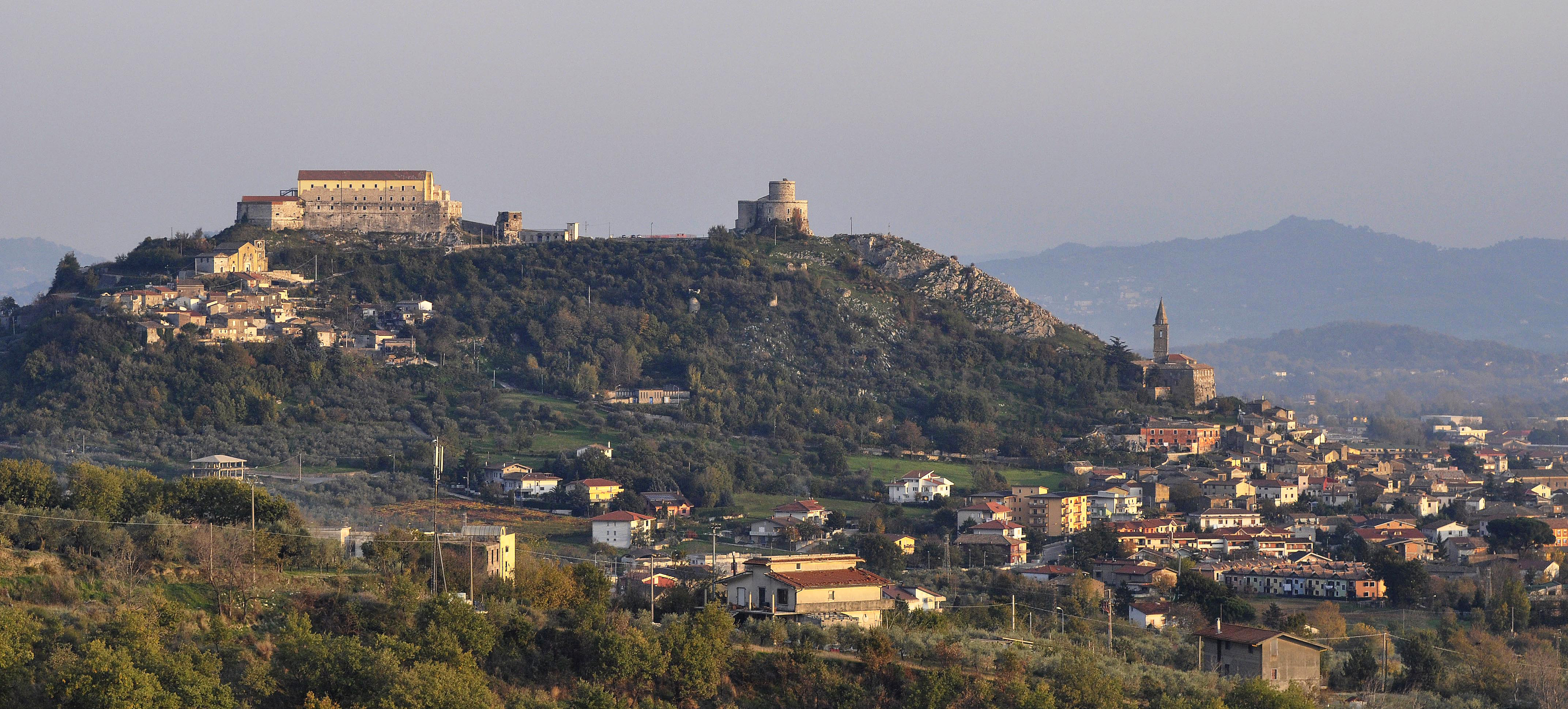
A view of Montesarchio

Niebuhr supposes the city to have been destroyed by the Romans, in revenge for their great defeat in its neighbourhood; but there is no evidence for this. It reappears at a later period as a small town situated on the Appian Way, and apparently deriving its chief importance from the transit of travellers: the same causes preserved it in existence down to the close of the Roman Empire. It received a colony of veterans; and it appears from Pliny, as well as from inscriptions, that it retained its municipal character, though deprived of a large portion of its territory in favor of the neighboring city of Beneventum. The period of its destruction is unknown: the name is still found in the 9th century, but it is uncertain whether the town still existed at that time.

The position of Caudium is fixed by the Itineraries, which all concur in placing it on the Appian Way, 21 Roman miles from Capua, and 11 from Beneventum.

=== Middle Ages and contemporary era ===
After the fall of the Western Roman Empire, in the 7th century a Lombard nobleman called Arcolo founded a shelter and fought against Charlemagne. In that occasion the town was fortified and a tower, still visible today, was built at the summit of the hill.

Later the castle was rebuilt, but the Normans destroyed it. The Castello di Montesarchio was again rebuilt in the 15th century. Feudatories who held Montesarchio include, starting from the 13th century, D'Aquino, Della Leonessa, Caracciolo, Carafa and D'Avalos, who owned it until the abolition of feudality in 1805.

== Main sights ==
- The D'Avalos Castle, later turned into a jail by the Bourbon Kings of Two Sicilies.
- Abbey of St. Nicholas.
- Church of St. Francis.
- Ancient marble fountain, in the main square.

== Twin towns – sister cities ==
Montesarchio is twinned with:

- La Garde, France (1977)
- Bethlehem, Palestine (2006)
