= Rotondi =

- Comune
- Comune di Rotondi

- Location within Italy Location within Campania
- Coordinates: 41°1′57″N 14°35′45″E
- Country: Italy
- Region: Campania
- Province: Avellino (AV)
- Frazioni: Campizze

Government
  - Mayor: Antonio Russo

Area
  - Total: 7 km^{2} (2.7 sq mi)
- Elevation: 272 m (892 ft)

Population (31 December 2015)
  - Total: 3,591
  - Density: 510/km^{2} (1,300/sq mi)
- Demonym: Rotondesi
- Time zone: UTC+1 (CET)
  - Summer (DST): UTC+2 (CEST)
- Postal code: 83017
- Dialing code: 0824
- Patron saint: St. Michael
- Saint day: 29 September
- Website: Official website

Rotondi is a town and comune in the province of Avellino, Campania, southern Italy.
