= Airola =

- Comune
- Città di Airola
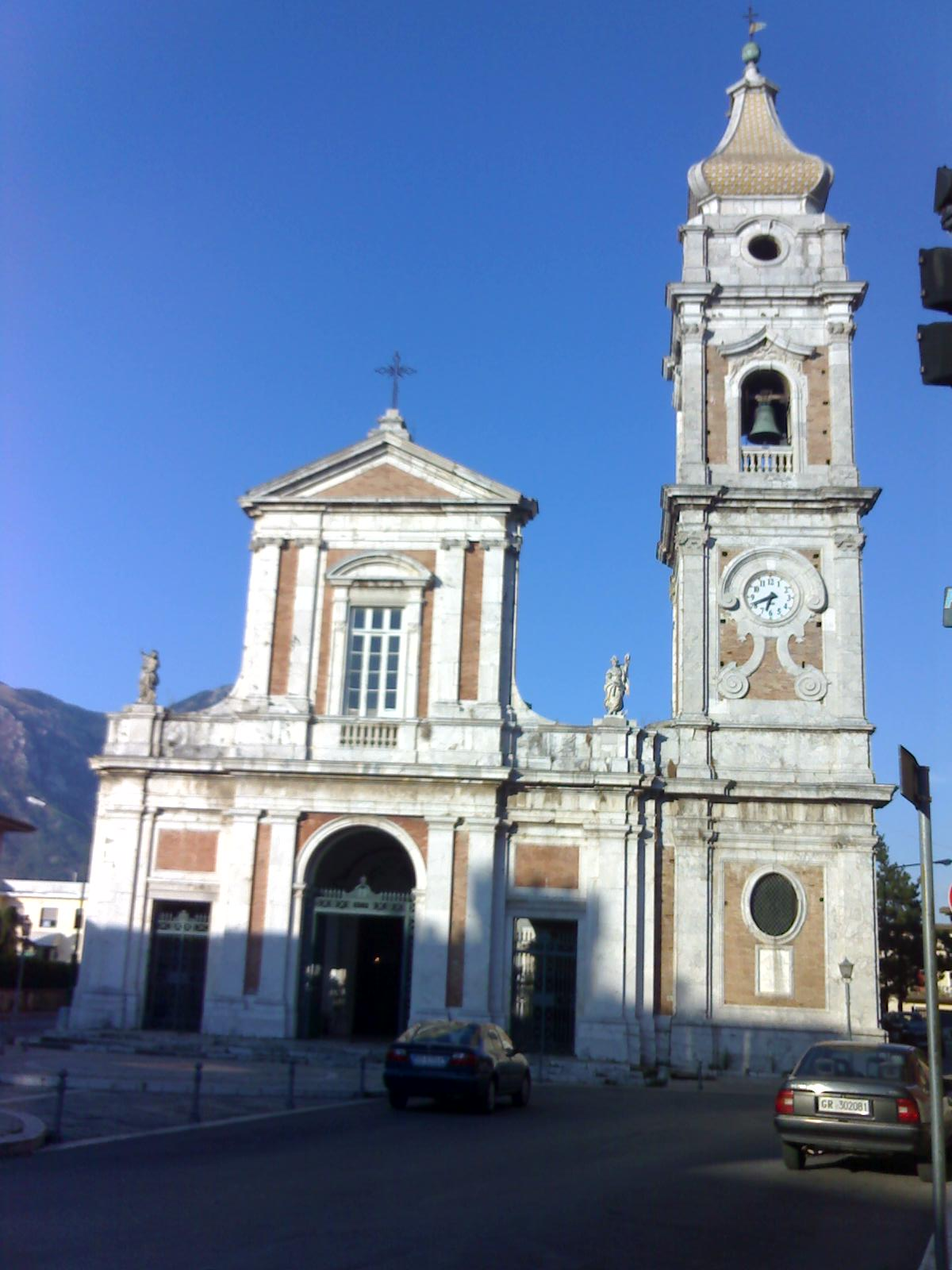
- Church of the Annunziata

- Location within Italy Location within Campania
- Coordinates: 41°4′N 14°34′E
- Country: Italy
- Region: Campania
- Province: Benevento (BN)

Government
  - Mayor: Vincenzo Falzarano

Area
  - Total: 14.9 km^{2} (5.8 sq mi)
- Elevation: 270 m (890 ft)

Population (1 January 2020)
  - Total: 8,176
  - Density: 549/km^{2} (1,420/sq mi)
- Demonym: Airolani
- Time zone: UTC+1 (CET)
  - Summer (DST): UTC+2 (CEST)
- Postal code: 82011
- Dialing code: 0823
- ISTAT code: 062001
- Patron saint: Saint George
- Saint day: April 23
- Website: Official website

Airola is a comune (municipality) in the Province of Benevento in the Italian region Campania, located about 35 km (22 mi) northeast of Naples and about 20 km (12 mi) southwest of Benevento in the Valle Caudina, facing the Monte Taburno. Nearby is the confluence of the Tesa and Faenza streams into the Isclero River. Airola's territory is also crossed by the Acquedotto Carolino, carrying waters to the Caserta Palace.

== History ==
Airola is mentioned for the first time in 997. Later it was a fief of Rainulf III of Alife, of Martin Toccabove and the Cortillon family. In 1460, after the siege of Ferdinand I of Naples, it was sold to the Carafa family, and was later given to Alfonso d'Avalos who, in turn, sold it to Ferrante Caracciolo in 1575.

Until 1816 it was included in the Principato Ultra of Avellino, and then was part of the Terra di Lavoro until the unification of Italy (1861), when it was annexed to the province of Benevento.

== Main sights ==
- Church of the Annunziata (14th-15th centuries), with an Annunciation altarpiece. The bell tower is from 1735. The 18th century façade was designed by Luigi Vanvitelli.
- Lombard castle
- Church of San Gabriele at Monte Oliveto
- Church of Santa Maria dell'Addolorata (14th century, restored in the 18th century)
- Church of San Michele (16th century)
- Palazzo Montevergine, built in 1606 by the Benedictines of Montevergine.
- 17th century churches of San Donato and San Carlo
