= Moiano =

- Comune
- Comune di Moiano
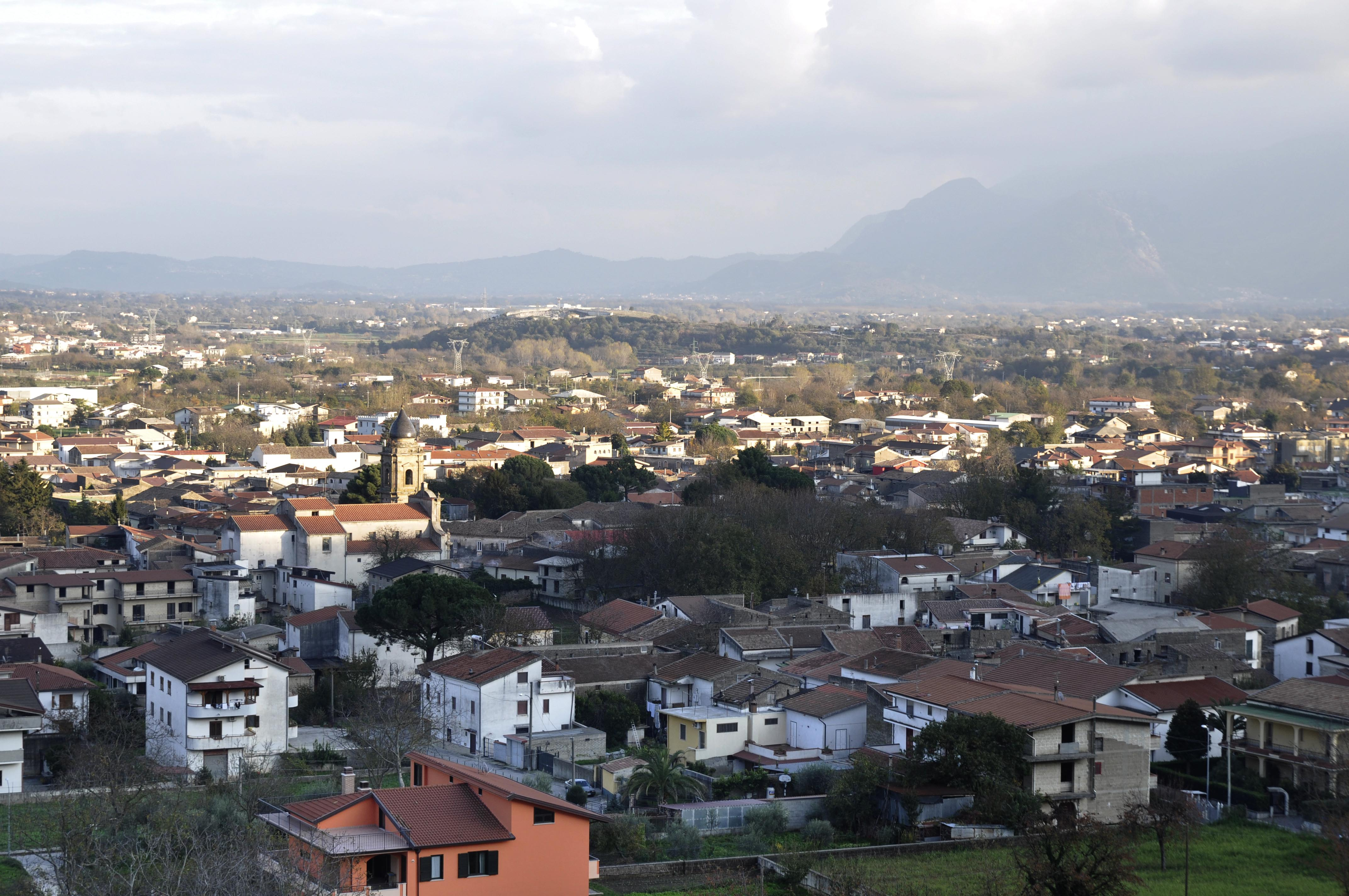
- Aerial view of Moiano

- Location within Italy Location within Campania
- Coordinates: 41°5′N 14°33′E
- Country: Italy
- Region: Campania
- Province: Benevento (BN)
- Frazioni: Luzzano

Government
  - Mayor: Giacomo Buonanno

Area
  - Total: 20.2 km^{2} (7.8 sq mi)
- Elevation: 271 m (889 ft)

Population (1 January 2020)
  - Total: 4,058
  - Density: 201/km^{2} (520/sq mi)
- Demonym: Moianesi
- Time zone: UTC+1 (CET)
  - Summer (DST): UTC+2 (CEST)
- Postal code: 82010
- Dialing code: 0823
- ISTAT code: 062040
- Patron saint: Saint Peter
- Saint day: 29 June

Moiano is a comune (municipality) in the Province of Benevento in the Italian region Campania, located about 40 kilometres (25 mi) northeast of Naples and about 20 kilometres (12 mi) southwest of Benevento on the western slope of the Monte Taburno, on the river Isclero.

The economy is mostly agricultural (cereals, fruit, vine). The main attraction is the church of St. Sebastian, with a fresco cycle by Tommaso Giaquinto.
