= Durazzano =

- Comune
- Comune di Durazzano
- Location within Italy Location within Campania
- Coordinates: 41°4′N 14°27′E
- Country: Italy
- Region: Campania
- Province: Benevento (BN)
- Frazioni: Casanova, San Giorgio, Cirigliano

Area
  - Total: 13.2 km^{2} (5.1 sq mi)

Population (1 January 2022)
  - Total: 2,108
  - Density: 160/km^{2} (414/sq mi)
- Time zone: UTC+1 (CET)
  - Summer (DST): UTC+2 (CEST)
- Postal code: 82015
- Dialing code: 0823
- ISTAT code: 062028
- Patron saint: Vincent Ferrer
- Saint day: 5 April
- Website: Official website

Durazzano is a comune (municipality) in the Province of Benevento in the Italian region Campania, located about 30 km (19 mi) northeast of Naples and about 30 km (19 mi) west of Benevento. As of 1 January 2020, it had a population of 2,171 and an area of 13.2 km^{2} (5.1 sq mi).

Durazzano borders the following municipalities: Cervino, Sant'Agata de' Goti, Santa Maria a Vico, Valle di Maddaloni.

== Demographic evolution ==
Historical population

Year	Pop.	±%
1861	1,798	—
1871	1,869	+3.9%
1881	1,864	−0.3%
1901	2,200	+18.0%
1911	1,971	−10.4%
1921	2,067	+4.9%

Year	Pop.	±%
1931	2,081	+0.7%
1936	2,262	+8.7%
1951	2,580	+14.1%
1961	2,471	−4.2%
1971	1,916	−22.5%
1981	1,813	−5.4%

Year	Pop.	±%
1991	1,913	+5.5%
2001	2,070	+8.2%
2011	2,261	+9.2%
2021	2,103	−7.0%
2022	2,108	+0.2%

Source: Data from ISTAT
