= Cervino, Campania =

Cervino
- Comune
- Comune di Cervino
- Location within Italy Location within Campania
- Coordinates: 41°3′N 14°25′E
- Country: Italy
- Region: Campania
- Province: Province of Caserta (CE)

Area
  - Total: 8.0 km^{2} (3.1 sq mi)

Population (Dec. 2004)
  - Total: 5,137
  - Density: 640/km^{2} (1,700/sq mi)
- Time zone: UTC+1 (CET)
  - Summer (DST): UTC+2 (CEST)
- Postal code: 81020
- Dialing code: 0823

Cervino (Campanian: Cervìnë) is a comune (municipality) in the Province of Caserta in the Italian region Campania, located about 30 kilometres (19 mi) northeast of Naples and about 7 kilometres (4 mi) east of Caserta. As of 31 December 2004, it had a population of 5,137 and an area of 8.0 square kilometres (3.1 mi^{2}).

Cervino borders the following municipalities: Durazzano, Maddaloni, Santa Maria a Vico, Valle di Maddaloni.

== Demographic evolution ==
Historical population

Year	Pop.	±%
1861	2,849	—
1871	3,174	+11.4%
1881	3,243	+2.2%
1901	3,168	−2.3%
1911	3,438	+8.5%

Year	Pop.	±%
1921	3,355	−2.4%
1931	3,431	+2.3%
1936	3,590	+4.6%
1951	4,248	+18.3%
1961	4,484	+5.6%

Year	Pop.	±%
1971	4,175	−6.9%
1981	4,382	+5.0%
1991	4,770	+8.9%
2001	5,016	+5.2%

Source: Data from ISTAT
