= San Leucio =

UNESCO World Heritage Site
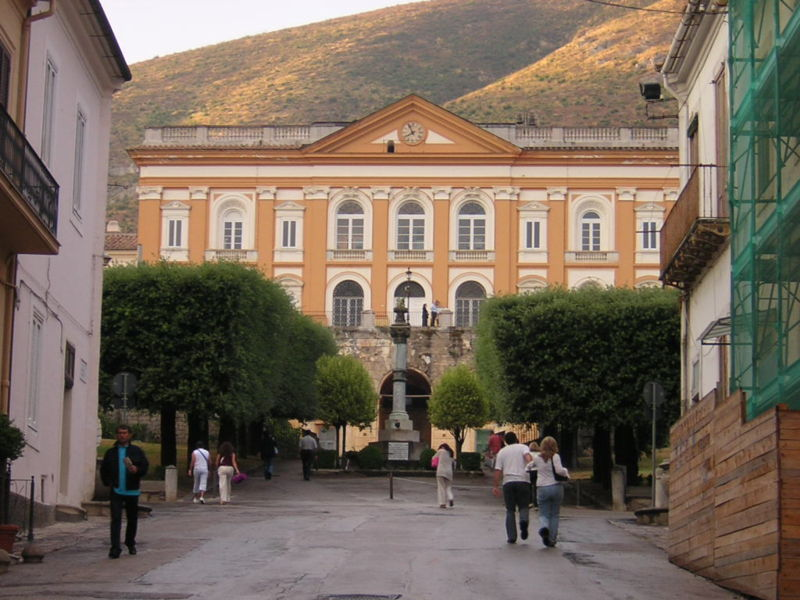
- Façade of the Palazzo Belvedere

- Location within Italy
- Location: Caserta, Italy
- Part of: 18th-Century Royal Palace at Caserta with the Park, the Aqueduct of Vanvitelli, and the San Leucio Complex
- Criteria: Cultural: i, ii, iii, iv
- Reference: 549rev
- Inscription: 1997 (21st Session)
- Area: 87.37 ha (0.3373 sq mi)
- Buffer zone: 110.76 ha (0.4276 sq mi)
- Website: www.sanleucionline.it
- Coordinates: 41°06′N 14°20′E

San Leucio is a frazione of the comune of Caserta, in the region of Campania in southern Italy. It is most notable for a resort developed around an old silk factory, named a UNESCO World Heritage Site in 1997.

It is located 3.5 km northwest of Caserta, at 145 m above sea level.

== History ==
In 1750 Charles VII of Naples, advised by minister Bernardo Tanucci, selected this place, originally the site of a royal hunting lodge for the Acquaviva family (now restored, and known as Palazzo del Belvedere), for an unusual social and technological experiment, a different model of production based on technical innovation and alert to the needs of workers. In its early days, San Leucio resort was a place for pleasure and a royal hunting preserve, built on the ruins of Saint Leucio church, where an aqueduct carried water to the waterfalls of the Royal Palace of Caserta, designed by Luigi Vanvitelli. The son of Charles, Ferdinand I, had a hunting lodge built for himself on this site. He was a very skillful hunter who disliked the pleasures and luxury of court life. It was here that Charles and the young King Ferdinand built a silk factory. The complex was transformed into a silk production site and industrial buildings were added, which was quite unique in late 18th-century Europe. Architect Francesco Collecini designed these industrial buildings, where noisy looms were installed next to royal apartments and a sitting room became a chapel for the workers.

A new village was built for workers' residences, and a large community of silk weavers grew into this industrial town, which in 1789 was deemed the "Real Colonia dei Setaioli" (the Silk Weavers Royal Colony). The king had planned to expand it into a true new city, called Ferdinandopoli, but the project was halted by the French invasion in 1799.

In San Leucio the most advanced technologies known in Europe at the time were used throughout the process to obtain the finished products. The members of the colony had a privileged status with a modern social security system. The French invasion stopped the complete realization of Ferdinandopoli, but San Leucio resort had further growth during French rule from 1806 to 1815.

== Today ==
The heritage of King Ferdinand still survives today in the local silk and textile firms, which work on an international scale to elite foreign clients as the Buckingham Palace, the White House, the Quirinal Palace and the Chigi Palace.

San Leucio resort is home to a Living Silk Museum with some original old looms and machinery restored and displayed inside the Belvedere courtyard, showing all the phases of silk productions, from the old looms and machinery to finished products. From 1997 San Leucio resort is included in the UNESCO World Heritage List in Europe as part of the site 18th Century Royal Palace at Caserta with the Park, the Aqueduct of Vanvitelli and the San Leucio Complex. From 1999 in summer months at San Leucio the Leuciana Festival is held, to promote the Belvedere of San Leucio and its park.

== Bibliography ==
- The Architecture of Modern Italy: Challenge of Tradition, 1750–1900 by Terry Kirk – ed. Princeton Architectural Press – New York – 2005 ISBN 1-56898-438-3 Excerpt page 39:...San Leucio...
- The Seduction of Place: The History and Future of the City by Joseph Rykwert ed. Oxford University Press – 2000 ISBN 978-0-19-280554-6 Excerpt page 85: ...San Leucio...
- Naples and Napoleon: Southern Italy and the European Revolutions, 1780–1860 by John A. Davis ed. Oxford University Press – 2006 ISBN 0-19-820755-7 Excerpt page 17: ...San Leucio...
- In the Shadow of Vesuvius: A Cultural History of Naples by Jordan Lancaster ed. J.B. Tauris &Co Ltd – 2005/2009 ISBN 978-1-84511-699-6 Excerpt page 144: ...San Leucio...
- Naples in the Eighteenth Century: The Birth and Death of a Nation State (Cambridge Studies in Italian History and Culture) by Girolamo Imbruglia – ed. The Press Syndicate of the University of Cambridge – 2000 – ISBN 0-521-63166-1 Excerpt page 151: ...San Leucio...
