= Villa Giulia, Naples =

Historic Italian villa

The Villa Giulia is a villa in Naples. It is located in the Barra district and is part of the Vesuvian villas of the Golden Mile.

== History ==
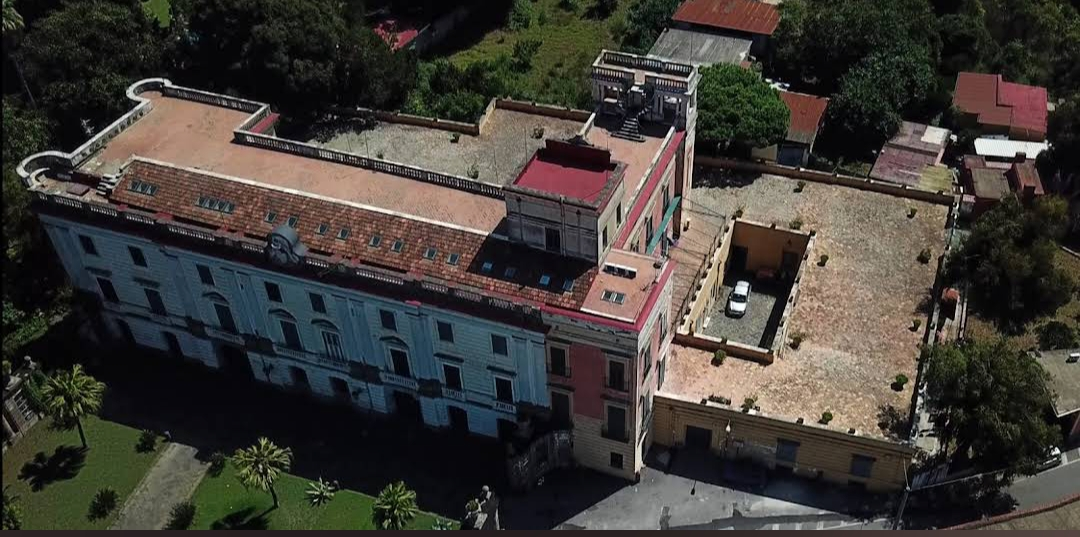
Villa Giulia seen from above (also known as San Nicandro)

The structure is mentioned in the Map of the Duke of Noja (18th century). The structure was called the "villa and delight of San Nicandro", and consisted of the factory courtyard.

Villa Giulia was designed by Luigi Vanvitelli.

The work on the site was supervised by Francesco Collecini, Pietro and Carlo Vanvitelli, sons of Luigi Vanvitelli. In June 1760, they took measurements and noted them on a praetorian tablet. In letters to his brother Urbano, Luigi said Carlo had tonsillitis. On 14 February 1761, Pietro and Marcello Fonton inspected the house, and inspected it three days later. Luigi was accompanied by Pietro to plant the façade. According to the letters, as construction was finishing, Luigi intervened several times due to the inexperience of his children, then in their early twenties.

The villa was bought by Domenico. It was modified by the decision of his grandson, Domenico Cattaneo Della Volta, third Prince of San Nicandro, subject of King Ferdinand IV of Naples. The country house was changed into a villa, to follow the King when the court moved to the Royal Palace of Portici, for hunting. The villa was called Giulia in honor of the wife of Volta, Giulia di Capua. Prince Domenico, in the last years of his life, lived in the villa, where he died in 1782.

The villa was expanded and redesigned by the architect Nicola Breglia in 1886, at the behest of the Duchess Giulia Cattaneo Pignatelli. By her wish, the villa was left to Diego de Gregorio di Sant'Elia, who adopted the surname Cattaneo by testamentary will. The villa is owned by his descendants.

Some features of the villa are the historic apartment, decorated by Ignazio Perricci and Salvatore Cepparulo, and the vast garden that shows the botanical species of the ancient park, with camellias and various statues.
