= Carlo Vanvitelli =

Italian architect and engineer

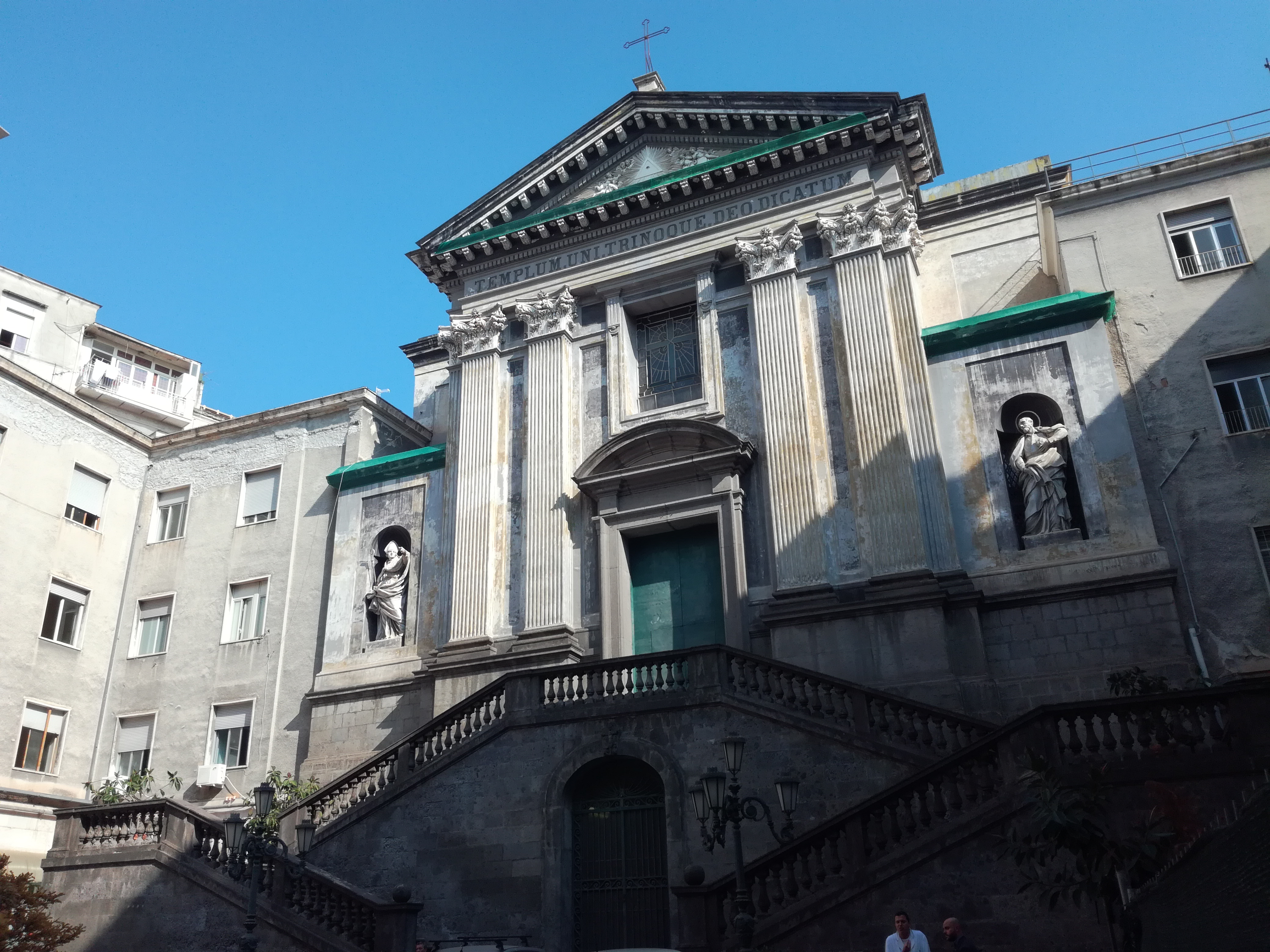
Church of Santissima Trinità dei Pellegrini in Naples.

Carlo Vanvitelli (1739–1821) was an Italian architect and engineer, who worked mainly in Naples and its surrounding area.

He was the son of architect Luigi Vanvitelli, and two of his brothers were also architects. Together with Pietro, he apprenticed under his father in the construction of the Palace of Caserta. Both worked at the decoration in Piazza Dante in Naples and at Villa Giulia. During the last years of his father's life, he resided in Caserta directing the works; when Luigi died (1773), Carlo Vanvitelli became director of the construction.

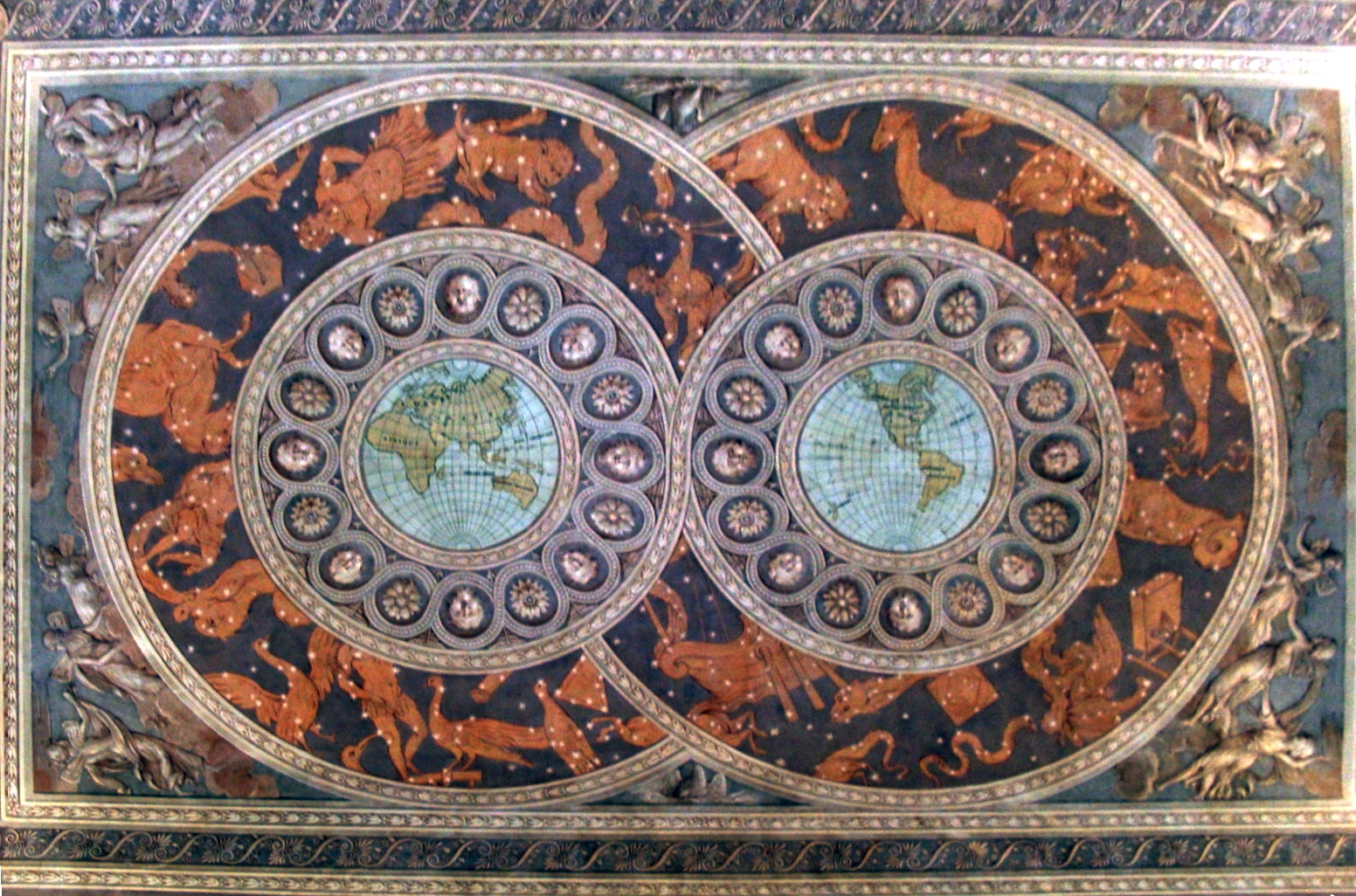
Reggia di Caserta

His other works include Palazzo Berio, Villa Reale, and Palazzo Doria d'Angri.

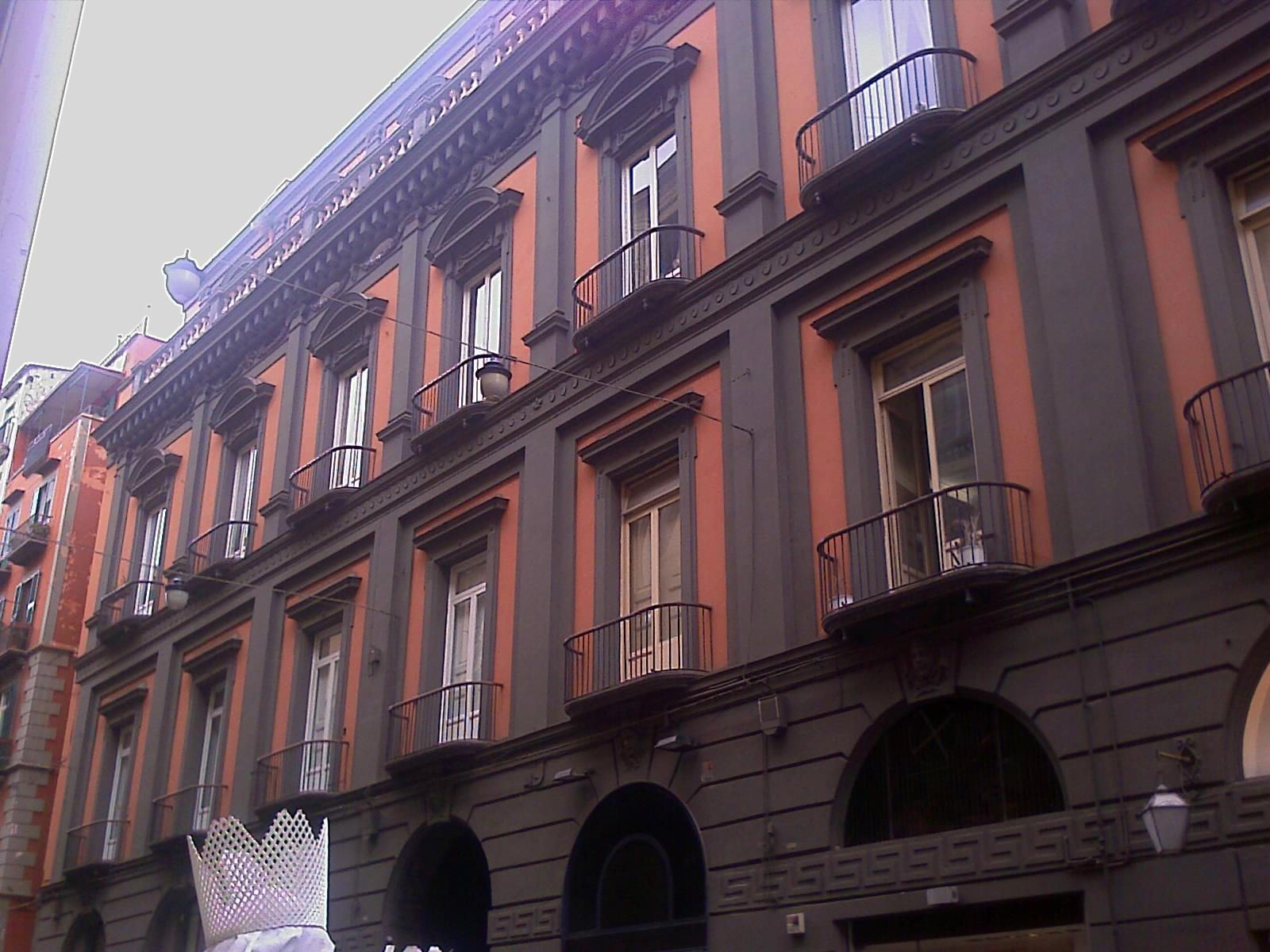
Palazzo Berio

== Biography ==
Charles and Peter had the same instruction, both worked in the yard of the Palace of Caserta and participated in the construction of the Aqueduct of Vanvitelli with Francesco and Pietro Bernasconi. In 1759 they collaborated with their father at the Foro Carolino. Their last collaboration was the Collecini for the relief of the Casino di San Nicandro in Barra.

== Sources ==
- Costanzo, Salvatore (2006). La Scuola del Vanvitelli. Dai primi collaboratori del Maestro all'opera dei suoi seguaci. Naples: Clean edizioni.
