= Valle di Maddaloni =

- Comune
- Comune di Valle di Maddaloni
- Location within Italy Location within Campania
- Coordinates: 41°4′44″N 14°24′53″E
- Country: Italy
- Region: Campania
- Province: Caserta (CE)

Government
  - Mayor: Buzzo Francesco

Area
  - Total: 10.8 km^{2} (4.2 sq mi)
- Elevation: 156 m (512 ft)

Population (1 May 2021)
  - Total: 2,661
  - Density: 246/km^{2} (638/sq mi)
- Demonym: Vallesi
- Time zone: UTC+1 (CET)
  - Summer (DST): UTC+2 (CEST)
- Postal code: 81020
- Dialing code: 0823
- Website: Official website

Valle di Maddaloni is a comune (municipality) of 2 661 inhabitants in the Province of Caserta in the Italian region Campania, located about 30 kilometres (19 mi) northeast of Naples and about 7 kilometres (4 mi) east of Caserta.

In the communal territory is the Caroline Aqueduct, built by architect Luigi Vanvitelli to carry water from Monte Taburno to the Caserta Palace.

== Origins of the name ==
The name has a clear origin: it derives from the Latin vallis valle. The Maddaloni specification identifies the area. In the past it was known with the name of Valle Tifantina, in reference to the neighboring mountains.

== History ==
The time of foundation of Valle di Maddaloni is not known, but its birth seems to be closely linked to the presence of a castle built on a hill not far from the original settlement in the early Middle Ages. The castle had to endure the raids of the Goths, the Vandals and the Saracens. The residential fabric of the town therefore has the typical conformation of medieval settlements, with a main path, today's Corso Umberto I, and small collateral branches. The history of Valle revolves throughout the Middle Ages around the fate of the castle which, starting from 1300 and until 1500, was the subject of hereditary or "forced" passages between various dynasties, including the Catalan family of "de La Rath" and the French Artois lineage. On the threshold of the fourteenth century, the castle had several rulers: it passed from the hands of Onorato I Caetani back to those of the "Della Ratta" and precisely from Giovanni, to Francesco and Caterina. Under the Spanish government, Ferdinand the Catholic confirmed to Caterina the possession of the territories of Valle, Caserta, Limatola, Dugenta and Sant'Agata de 'Goti. The current coat of arms is composed of a shield which, compulsorily adopted for the Authorities, must be of a shape commonly called "modern Samnite", that is composed of a rectangular shield with rounded lower corners. This element must maintain a proportion of six modules of width and nine modules of height, in whose area, called field, the various subdivisions take place.

The field of the coat of arms of Valle di Maddaloni, is of the truncated type, that is divided into two horizontal registers, this type of subdivision appears for the first time, among the coats of arms and gonfalons, in the fourteenth century. In the upper register there is the Annunciation, with the Archangel Gabriel on the left and the Blessed Virgin Mary kneeling on the right. The background of this field is a green background, a sign of victory, honor and abundance. In the lower register, however, there is a masonry castle with three towers, five windows and a central door, a symbol of nobility and feudal power, all on a blue background, a symbol of glory, virtue and firmness, a tone very present in the coats of arms. municipal. On the sides of this castle there is the inscription "Valle", which for reasons of "balance" has been divided for both sides.

== Monuments and places of interest ==
- Carolino Aqueduct, in the municipality of Valle di Maddaloni are the Ponti della Valle, the Carolino aqueduct built by Luigi Vanvitelli to bring water from the sources of Mount Taburno to the Royal Palace of Caserta and included in the UNESCO World Heritage List.
- Monumento Ossario ai Caduti garibaldini, author of the project, for the architectural part was the engineer Carmelo Destino, while the sculptor Enrico Mossuti created the bronze statue depicting the winged victory and the stone high-reliefs with the portrait of the protagonists of the Garibaldi epic. The construction was carried out by Giuseppe Cozzolino.
