= Aqueduct of Vanvitelli =

UNESCO World Heritage Site
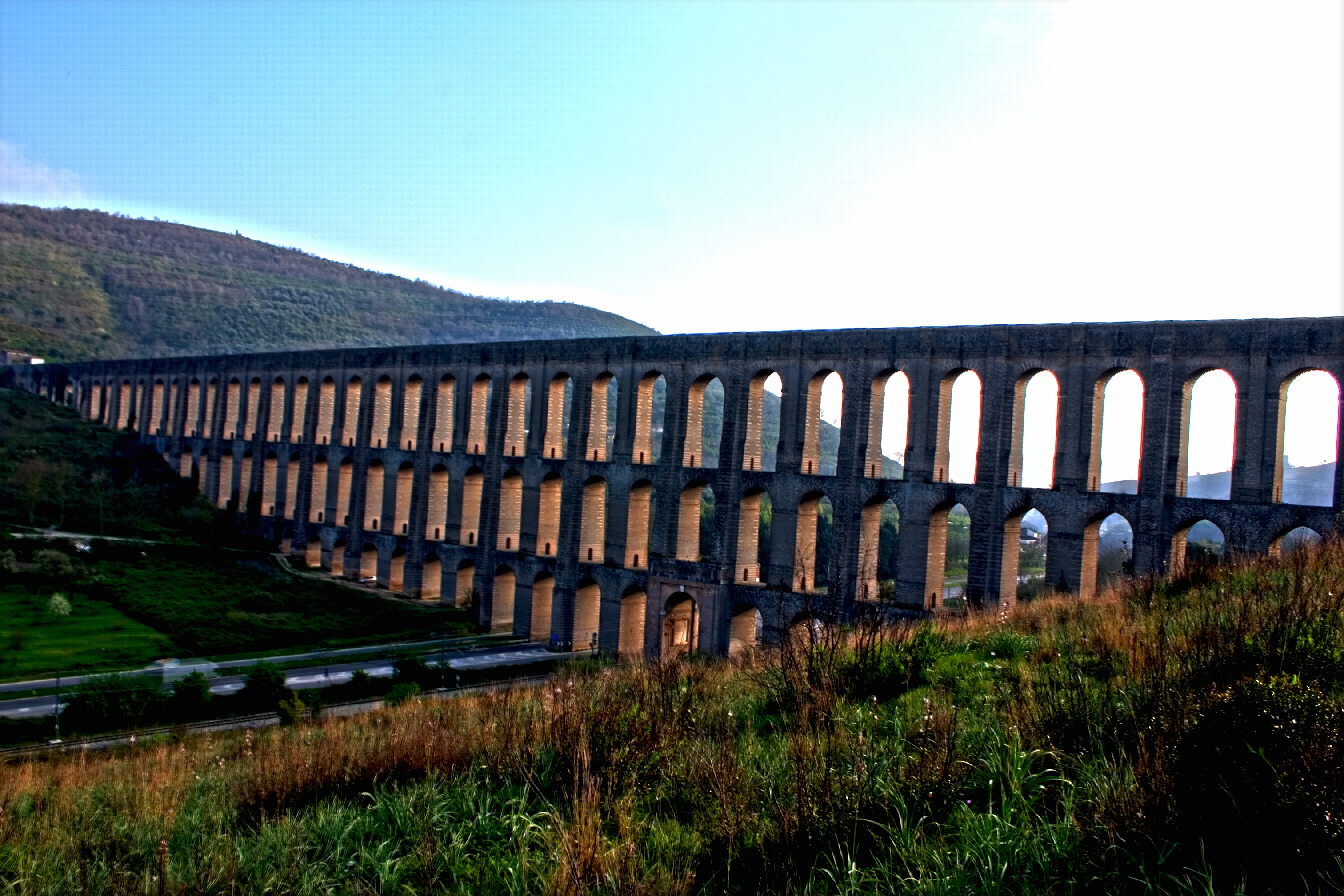
- The Aqueduct of Vanvitelli

- Location within Italy
- Location: Benevento Province, Province of Caserta, Italy
- Part of: 18th-Century Royal Palace at Caserta with the Park, the Aqueduct of Vanvitelli, and the San Leucio Complex
- Criteria: Cultural: (i), (ii), (iii), (iv)
- Reference: 549rev
- Inscription: 1997 (21st Session)
- Area: 87.37 ha (0.3373 sq mi)
- Buffer zone: 110.76 ha (0.4276 sq mi)
- Coordinates: 41°03′33″N 14°24′06″E

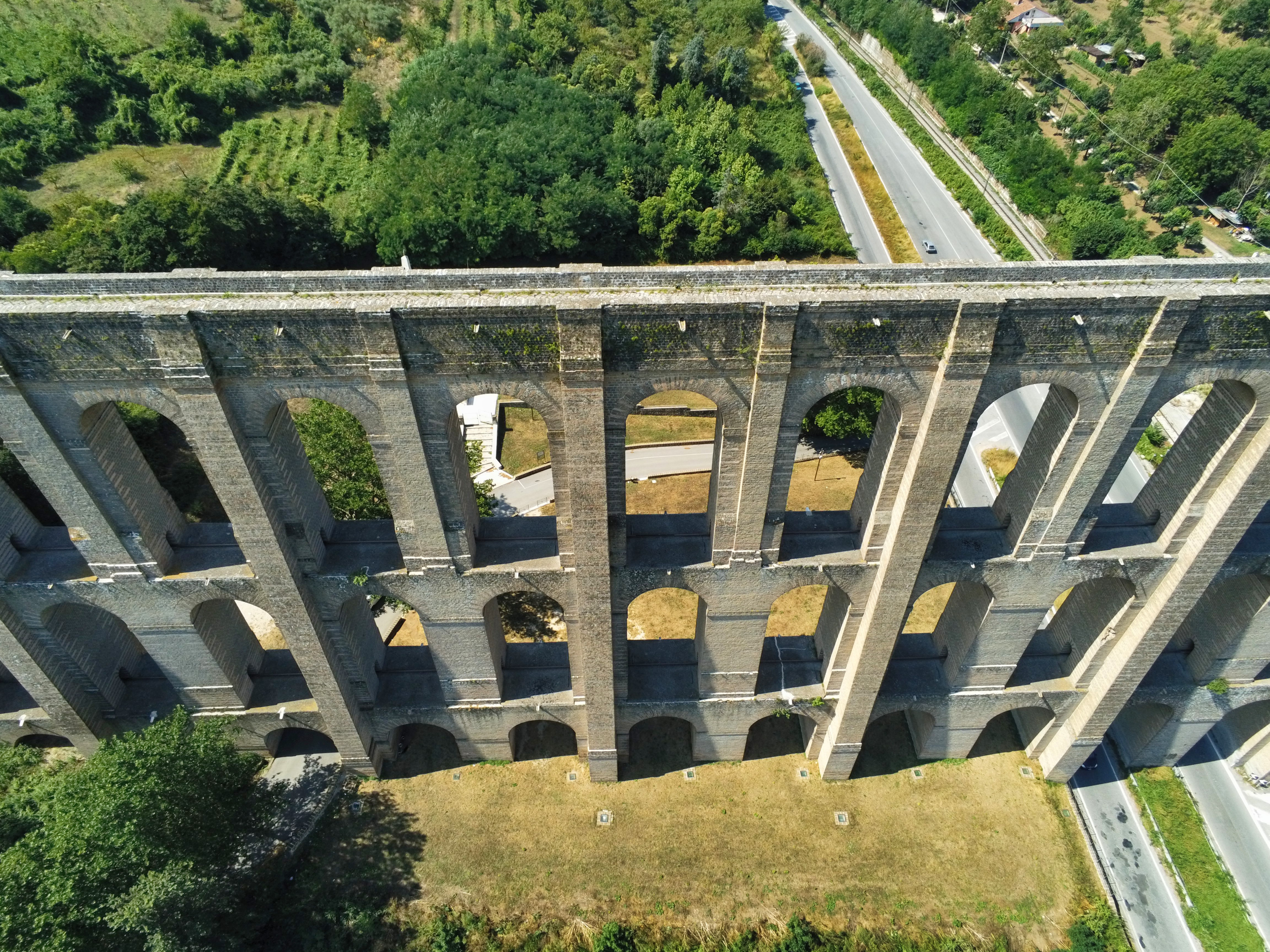
Bird's eye view

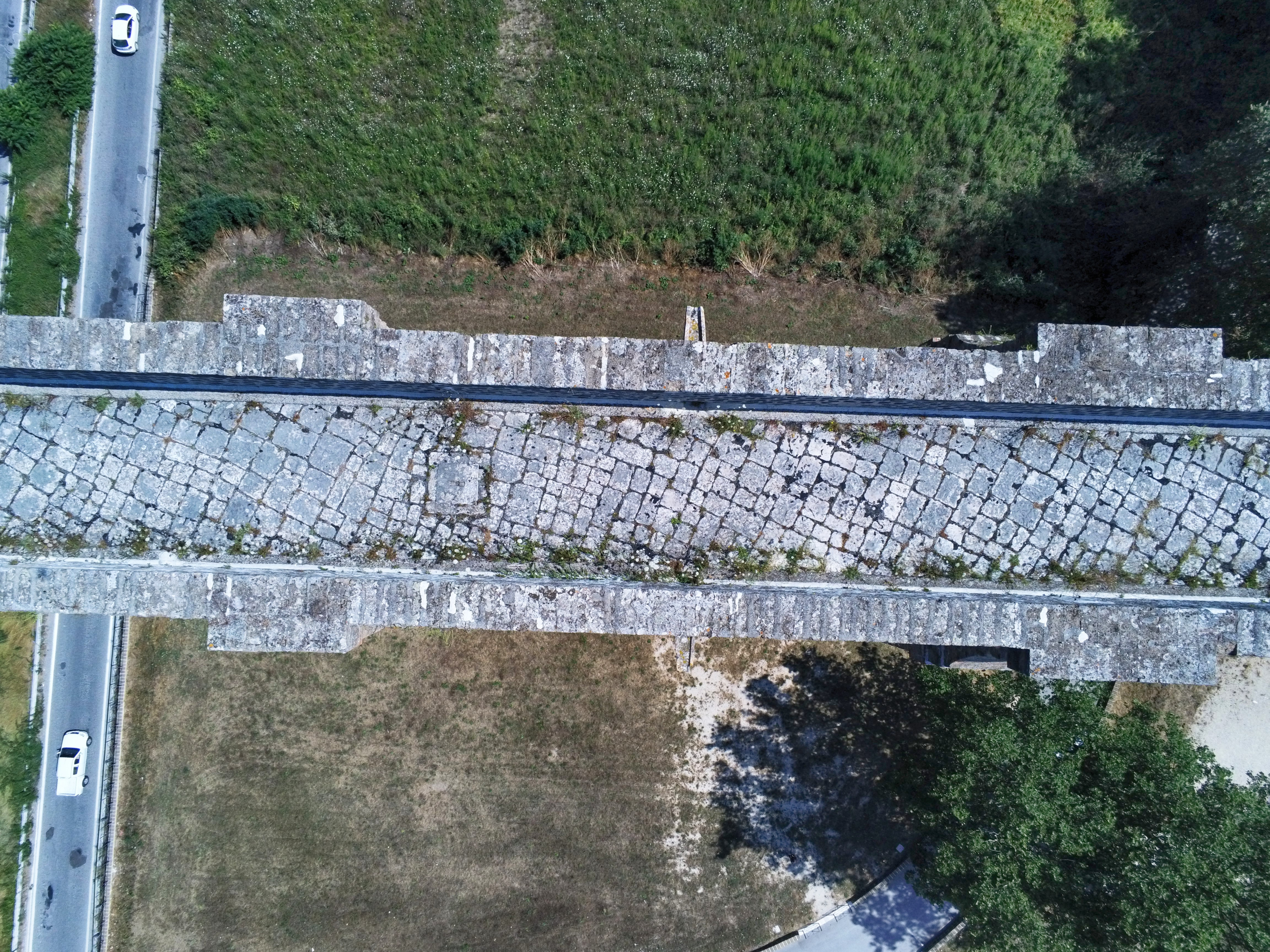
Top view

The Aqueduct of Vanvitelli or Caroline Aqueduct (Italian: Acquedotto Carolino) is a 38-kilometre (24 mi) aqueduct that supplied water to the Reggia di Caserta and the San Leucio complex from the foot of the Taburno massif and springs of the Fizzo Contrada, in the territory of Bucciano.

Mostly underground, the aqueduct is noted for its well-preserved, three-tier, 529-metre-long (1,736 ft) tufa-arched section bridging the Valle di Maddaloni between Monte Longano (to the east) and Monte Garzano (to the west). This section was modelled after Roman arched aqueducts, is 55.8 metres (183 ft) high at its highest point, crosses what is now highway SP335 — and was designated a World Heritage Site in 1997.

Commissioned by Charles of Bourbon, the aqueduct was designed by and named after Luigi Vanvitelli. Construction began in March 1753 and it opened on 7 May 1762. It is located in SS265, 81020 Valle di Maddaloni CE, Italy.
