= Royal Palace of Caserta =

Former royal residence in Caserta, Italy

- Reggia di Caserta
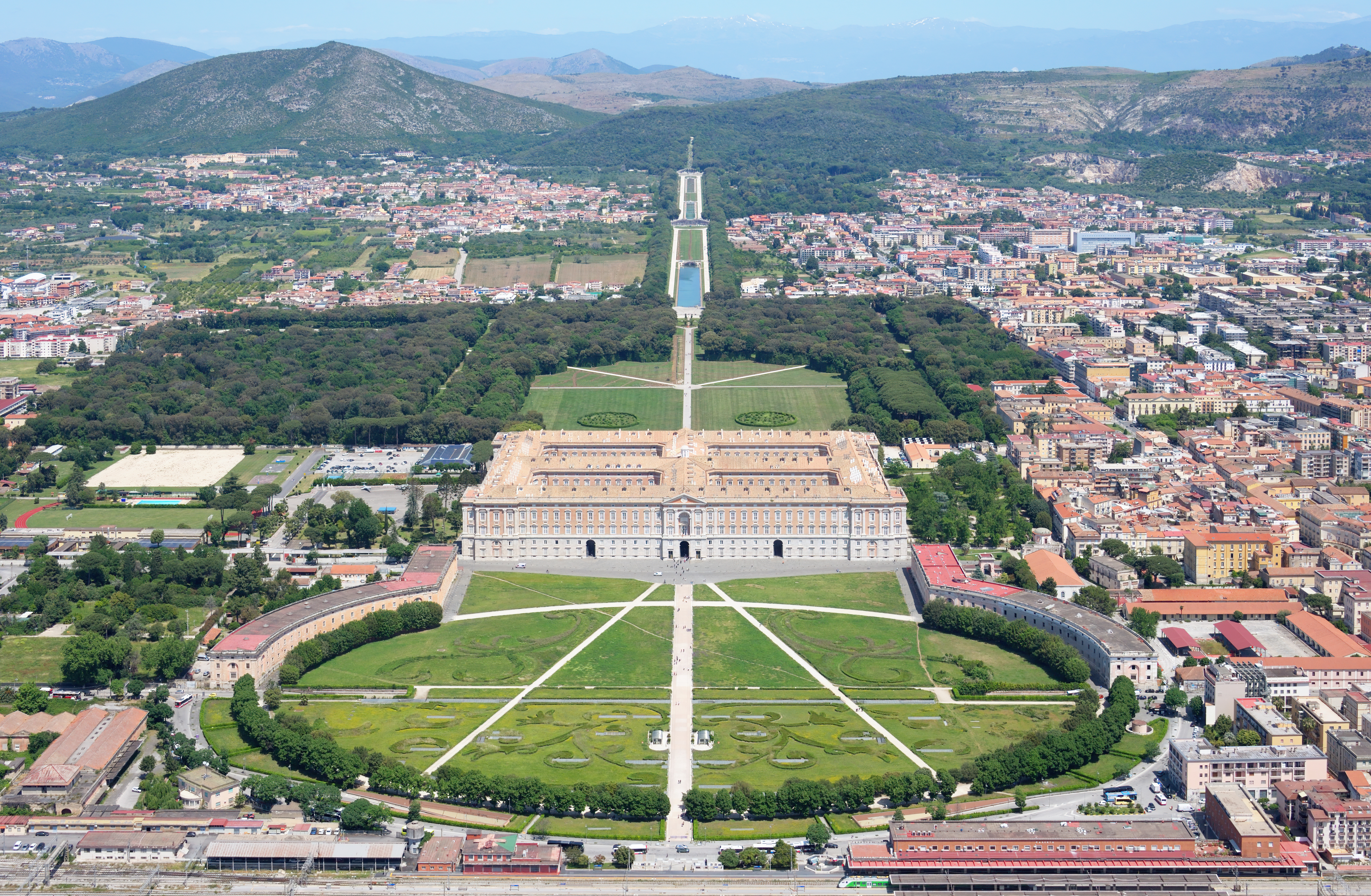
- Interactive map of the Royal Palace of Caserta area
- Alternative names: Palazzo Reale di Caserta

General information
- Type: Palace
- Architectural style: Late Baroque and early Neoclassical
- Location: Caserta, Italy, Viale Douhet, 81100 Caserta CE, Italy
- Construction started: 1752

Technical details
- Size: 247 x 190 m; 41-42 m high
- Floor area: c. 130,000 square metres (1,400,000 sq ft)

Other information
- Number of rooms: 1,200

Website
- reggiadicaserta.cultura.gov.it
- Location within Italy

UNESCO World Heritage Site
- Part of: 18th-Century Royal Palace at Caserta with the Park, the Aqueduct of Vanvitelli, and the San Leucio Complex
- Criteria: (i), (ii), (iii), (iv)
- Reference: 549rev
- Inscription: 1997 (21st Session)
- Area: 87.37 ha (0.3373 sq mi)
- Buffer zone: 110.76 ha (0.4276 sq mi)
- Coordinates: 41°4′24″N 14°19′35″E

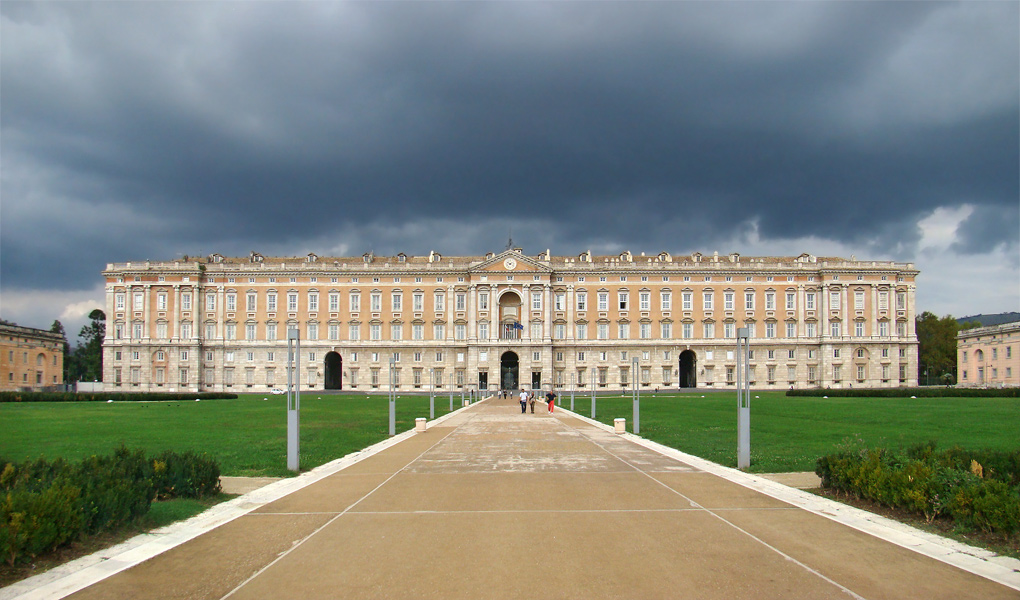
Main façade of the palace

The Royal Palace of Caserta (Italian: Reggia di Caserta [ˈrɛddʒa di kaˈzɛrta, - kaˈsɛrta]; Neapolitan: Reggia 'e Caserta [ˈrɛdːʒ(ə) e kaˈsertə]) is a former royal palace in Caserta, Campania, 35 kilometres (22 mi) north of Naples in southern Italy, constructed by the House of Bourbon-Two Sicilies as their main residence as Kings of Naples.

With a volume of around 2 million m^{3}, covering an area of 47,000 m^{2} and a floor area of 130,000 square metres distributed across five floors, the Royal Palace of Caserta is one of the largest palaces erected in Europe during the 18th century and one of the largest former royal residences in the world. In 1997, the palace was designated a UNESCO World Heritage Site.

== History ==
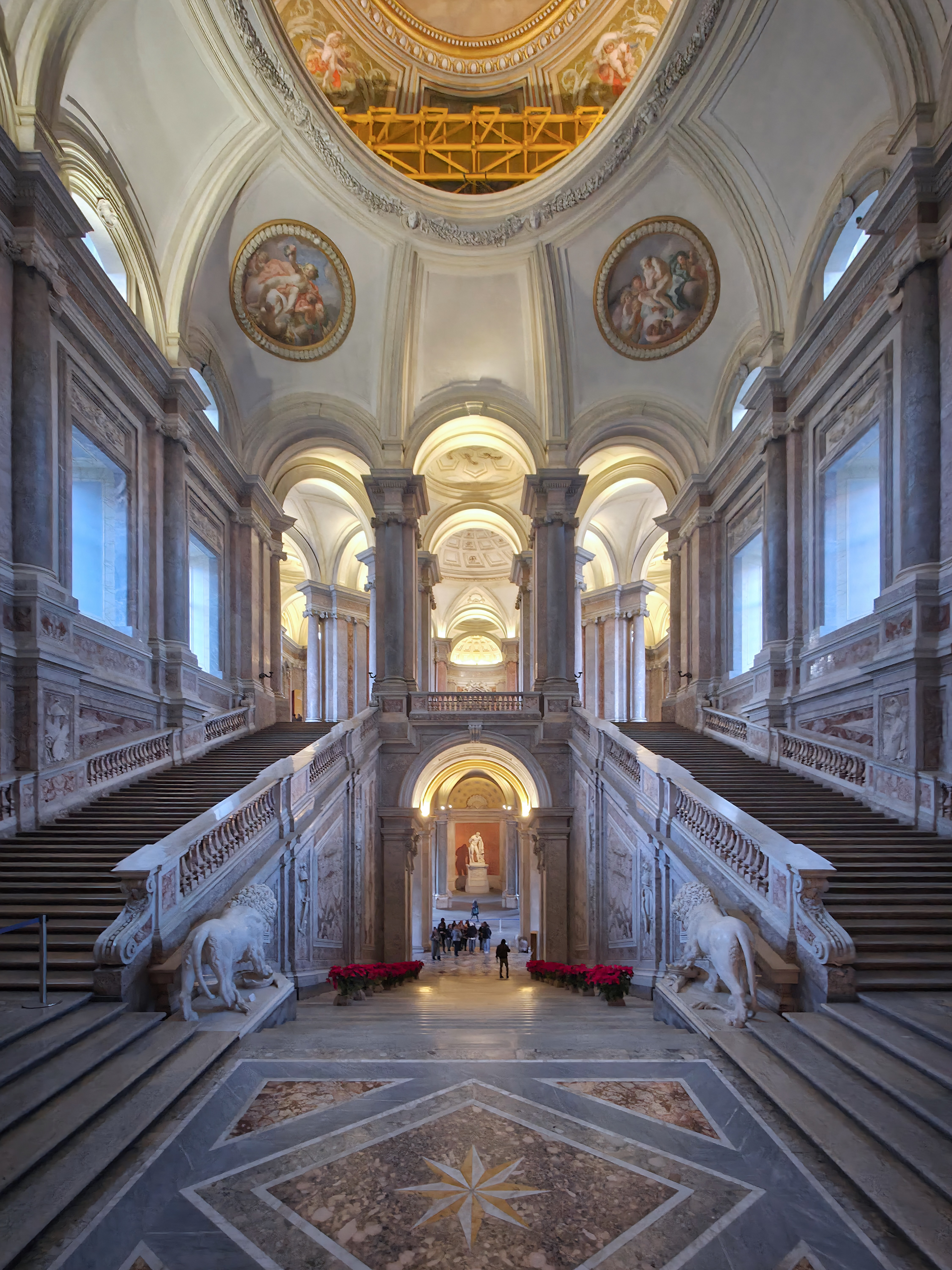
Grand Staircase of Honour

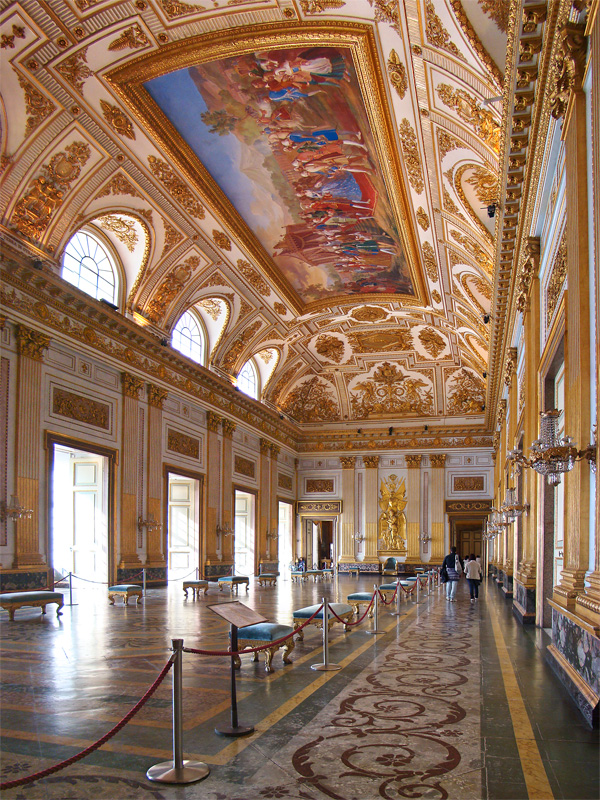
The throne room

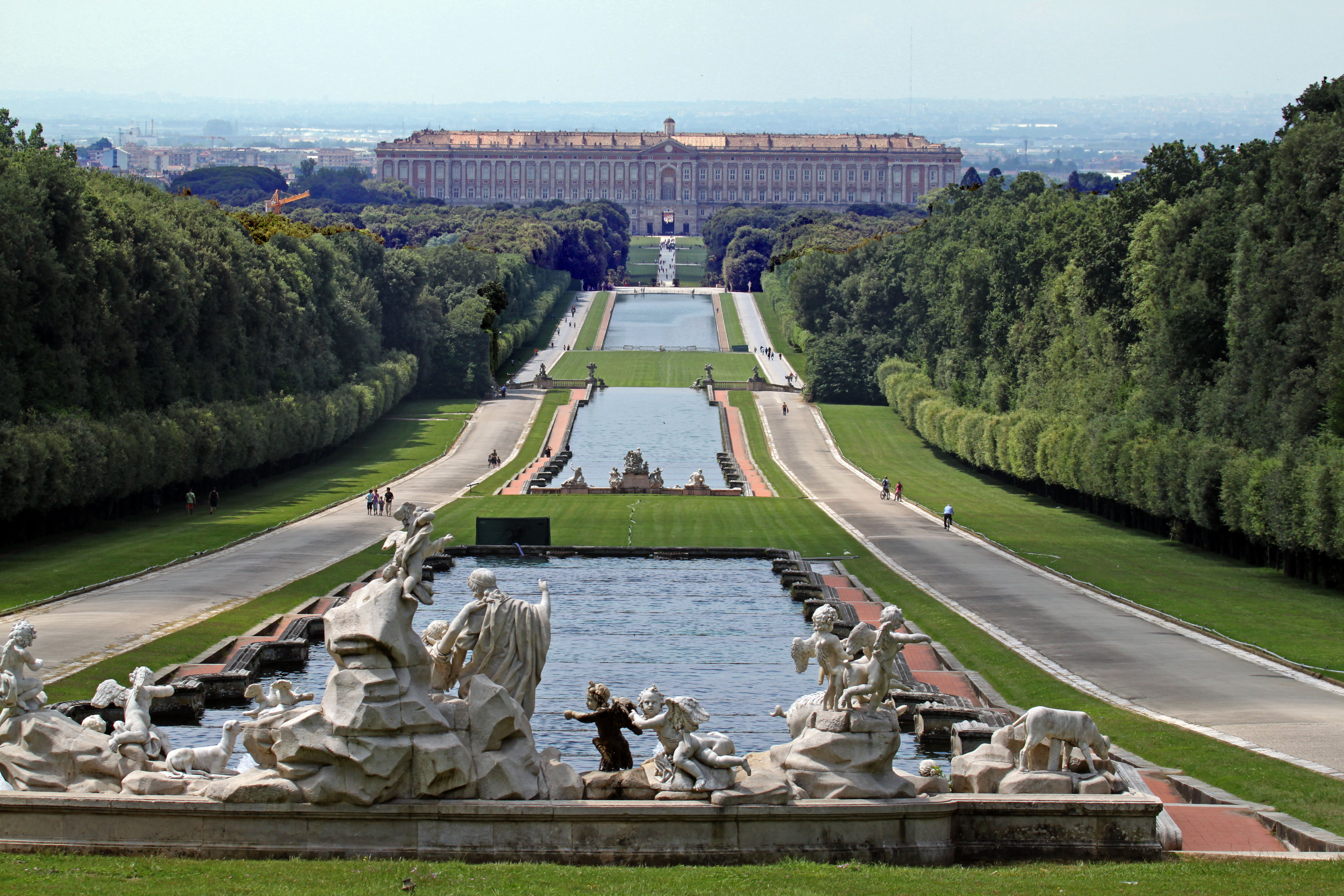
View of the northern façade from the fountain of Venus and Adonis

The construction of the palace began in 1752 for Charles VII of Naples (later Charles III of Spain), who worked closely with his architect, Luigi Vanvitelli. In the end, Charles never slept a night at the Reggia, as he abdicated in 1759 to become King of Spain. The project was carried to only partial completion for Charles' third son and successor, Ferdinand IV of Naples.

The political and social model for Vanvitelli's palace was Versailles, which, though very different in its variety and disposition, solved similar problems of assembling and providing for the king, court, and government in a large building with the social structure of a small city, confronting a baroque view of a highly subordinated nature, la nature forcée. This was part of the entire concept of the palace when Mario Gioffredo first proposed it in 1750. According to George L. Hersey, the proposal envisaged a palace "that was a virtual city, housing not just the court and king but all the main political and cultural elites of the kingdoms of Naples and Sicily - university, museum, library, cabinet bureaus, military high commands, and so on." The population of Caserta Vecchia was moved 10 kilometres (6.2 mi) to provide a workforce closer to the palace. A silk factory at San Leucio was disguised as a pavilion in the parkland. Another of the king's primary objectives was to have a new royal court and administrative center for the kingdom in a location protected from sea attack and distant from the revolt-prone and congested city of Naples. Troop barracks were housed within the palace to provide the king with suitable protection.

Vanvitelli died in 1773 and the construction was continued by his son Carlo and then by other architects; but the elder Vanvitelli's original project, which included a pair of frontal wings similar to Bernini's colonnades at St. Peter's Square, was never finished. In 1861, with the birth of the Kingdom of Italy, Savoyard officials surveyed the contents of the Palace. The bidet was inventoried as follows: "strange object in the shape of a guitar".

From 1923 to 1943, the palace was the location of the Accademia Aeronautica, the Italian Air Force Academy. From 1943, during the allied invasion, the royal palace served as Allied Force Headquarters for the Supreme Allied Commander in the Mediterranean area; Sir Maitland Wilson, and later Sir Harold Alexander. It became associated with the Allied occupation and with the 29 April 1945 signing of the surrender of German forces in Italy, an episode later commemorated by the museum and local institutions in the exhibition La Reggia liberata. L’occupazione militare alleata, la resa tedesca, la restituzione all’Italia. 1943–1947. In April 1945, the palace was the site of the signing of the unconditional surrender of German and Italian RSI forces in Italy. The agreement covered between 600,000 and 900,000 soldiers along the Italian Front, including troops in sections of Austria. The first Allied war crimes trial took place in the palace in 1945; German general Anton Dostler was sentenced to death and executed nearby, in Aversa. In the left-hand arc behind the façade, a set of barracks was built, referred to in the papers of Lt. Gen. John C. H. Lee as the "Cascade Camp." During World War II, the soldiers of the US Fifth Army recovered here in a "rest center."

The Palace of Caserta suffered its most serious documented wartime damage during World War II. In September 1943 an aerial bombardment struck the palace, with the Palatine Chapel sustaining the gravest losses. The chapel had contained eight large eighteenth-century canvases commissioned by Charles of Bourbon and Maria Amalia of Saxony from artists including Sebastiano Conca, Giuseppe Bonito and Anton Raphael Mengs. Almost all of these paintings were destroyed, together with parts of the ceiling and columns, the organs, sculptures and valuable sacred furnishings. The altar painting of the Immaculate Conception, attributed to Giuseppe Bonito, is recorded by the museum as the only surviving canvas from the chapel’s original pictorial cycle.

Separately, in 2025 the museum announced a programme to create publicly accessible storage areas for historical-artistic objects that had not formed part of the public visitor offer. According to the Reggia, a survey of the palace and park had identified objects dispersed through the complex, often without an organic location or secure archival references. The programme includes the recovery, cataloguing, digitization and conservation of paintings, frames, furnishings, stone material, paper documents, applied arts, textiles, sacred vestments, presepe elements and other objects.

The complex has also suffered later accidental and structural damage. On 4 November 1998, shortly after the site’s inscription on the World Heritage List, a fire broke out in part of the attic of the palace. UNESCO recorded that the damage was restricted to less monumental spaces and the roof, and that restoration works had begun. In December 2017 a large section of plaster fell in the Sala delle Dame di Compagnia; no one was injured and the museum director stated that there was no structural damage. The collapse was linked in contemporary reports to earlier repair methods after the 1930 Irpinia earthquake and to later consolidation work, with the affected area described as close to the part of the royal apartment that had suffered the worst damage in the 1980 Irpinia earthquake.

The palace, park, Aqueduct Carolino and San Leucio complex remain part of a UNESCO World Heritage Site.

== Layout of the palace ==
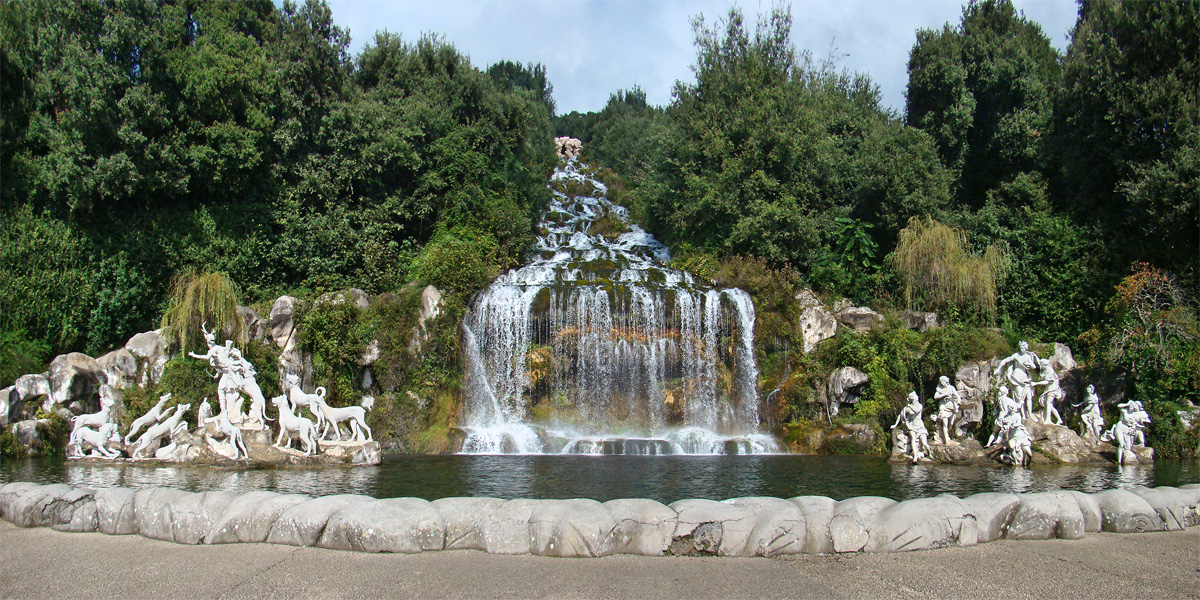
The Diana and Actaeon Fountain at the feet of the Grand Cascade

The palace has five floors; 1,200 rooms, including two dozen state apartments; 1,742 windows; 34 staircases; 1,026 fireplaces; a large library; and a theatre modelled after the Teatro San Carlo of Naples. The Palatine Chapel was designed by Luigi Vanvitelli on the model of the chapel at Versailles, although he criticized the French model and departed from it by placing the chapel inside the Royal Palace, with direct access from the Upper Vestibule.

An avenue running 20 kilometres between the palace and Naples was planned but never realized.

The palace has a rectangular plan, measuring 247 m × 190 m (810 ft × 623 ft), and the four sides are connected by two orthogonal arms, forming four inner courts.

Caserta has a volume of around 2 million cubic metres (70 million cubic feet). The floor space is 130,000 square metres. Behind the façades of its matching segmental ranges of outbuildings that flank the giant forecourt, a jumble of buildings arose to facilitate daily business. The palace encloses four courts that feature what scholars describe as a well-proportioned interior.

Like its French predecessor, the palace was intended to display the power and grandeur of an absolute Bourbon monarchy. The enfilades of Late Baroque saloni were the heart and seat of government, as well as displays of national wealth. Caserta provided a royal refuge from the dust and factions of the capital, just as Versailles had freed Louis XIV from Paris.

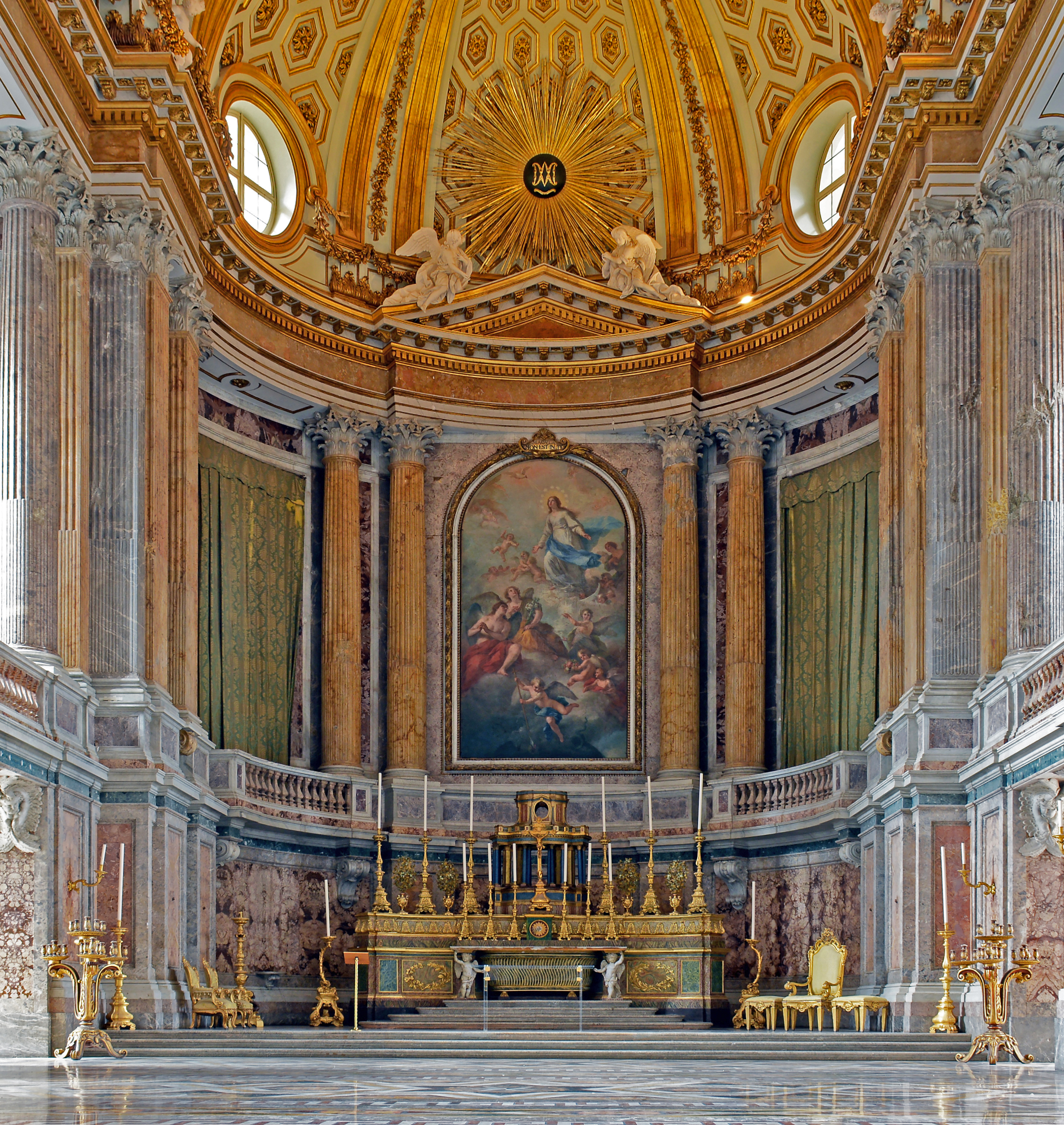
Palatine Chapel

== The park ==
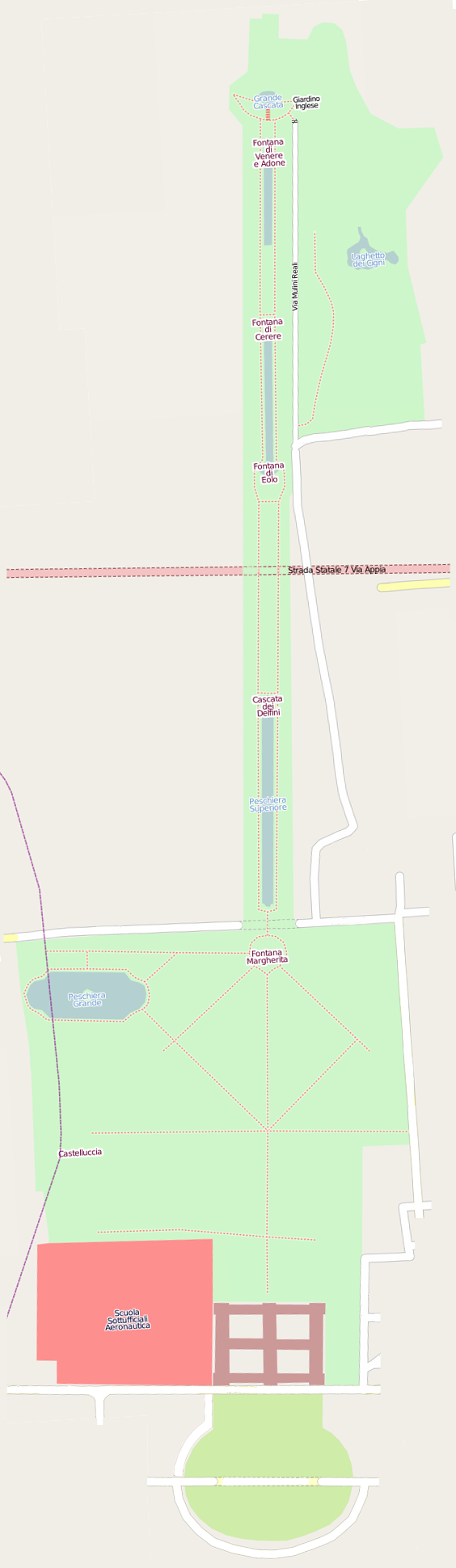
Map

The garden, a typical example of the Baroque extension of formal vistas, stretches for 120 hectares (300 acres), partly on hilly terrain. Its construction started in 1753, and it is also inspired by the park of Versailles. The park starts from the back façade of the palace, flanking a long alley with artificial fountains and cascades. There is a botanical garden called "The English Garden" in the upper part designed in the 1780s by Carlo Vanvitelli and the German-born botanist, nurseryman, and plantsman-designer, John Graefer, who was trained in London and recommended to Sir William Hamilton by Sir Joseph Banks. It is an early Continental example of an English garden in the svelte naturalistic taste of Capability Brown.

The fountains and cascades, each filling a vasca (basin), with architecture and hydraulics by Luigi Vanvitelli at intervals along a wide straight canal that runs to the horizon. These include:

- The Fountain of Diana and Actaeon (sculptures by Paolo Persico, Angelo Maria Brunelli, and Tommaso Solari);
- The Fountain of Venus and Adonis (1770–80);
- The Fountain of the Dolphins (1773–80);
- The Fountain of Aeolus;
- The Fountain of Ceres.

Many figures from classical Antiquity were modelled by Gaetano Salomone for the gardens of the Reggia and were executed by large workshops.

== UNESCO World Heritage Site ==
The palace was listed as a UNESCO World Heritage Site in 1997. According to the rationale, the palace, "whilst cast in the same mould as other 18th-century royal establishments, is exceptional for the broad sweep of its design, incorporating not only an imposing palace and park but also much of the surrounding natural landscape and an ambitious new town laid out according to the urban planning precepts of its time."

== See also ==
- Asteroid 274246 Reggiacaserta
- List of Baroque residences
