= Santa Maria a Vico =

- Comune
- Comune di Santa Maria a Vico
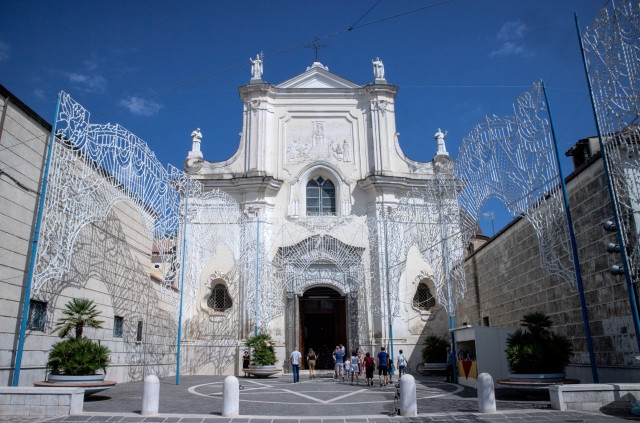

- Location within Italy Location within Campania
- Coordinates: 41°2′N 14°29′E
- Country: Italy
- Region: Campania
- Province: Caserta (CE)
- Frazioni: Ruotoli

Government
  - Mayor: Andrea Pirozzi

Area
  - Total: 10.8 km^{2} (4.2 sq mi)
- Elevation: 83 m (272 ft)

Population (31 August 2018)
  - Total: 14,023
  - Density: 1,300/km^{2} (3,360/sq mi)
- Demonym: Santamariani
- Time zone: UTC+1 (CET)
  - Summer (DST): UTC+2 (CEST)
- Postal code: 81028
- Dialing code: 0823
- Patron saint: St. Nicholas of Bari
- Saint day: December 6
- Website: Official website

Santa Maria a Vico is a comune (municipality) in the Province of Caserta in the Italian region Campania, located about 30 kilometres (19 mi) northeast of Naples and about 13 kilometres (8 mi) southeast of Caserta.

In the past it had a largely agricultural economy though today it is a flourishing commercial centre. Santa Maria a Vico is strategically positioned between Caserta, Benevento and Naples.

== History ==
The town was founded as a military colony by the Romans during the Second Samnite War, as Vicus Novanensis. Later it was a stage on the ancient Appian Way, called Ad Novas.

It was destroyed during the barbaric invasions, and later rebuilt, flourishing as a trade center under the Aragonese dynasty of the Kingdom of Naples.

On 5 June 1498, Frederick of Naples granted the permission for the Mastro Mercato to the town of Santa Maria a Vico; before that date this privilege was only reserved to Bari, Cosenza, Lucera, Reggio and Taranto. This event brought to a further development of the town, which reached its commercial peak under the Aragonese dynasty.

Up until 1927, when by order of the Fascist Regime the edict that established the borders of the provinces in Campania was suppressed and substituted with a new one, the town of Santa Maria a Vico was a province of Naples. The new edict, passed under the name of "Terra di Lavoro", has its roots in the project of King Francis I of the Two Sicilies, who in 1818 wanted to give more importance to the area of Caserta, which had been chosen as location to build the new Royal Palace. Starting from 1861, many towns and cities stopped being under the influence of Naples, to be redistributed into new districts.

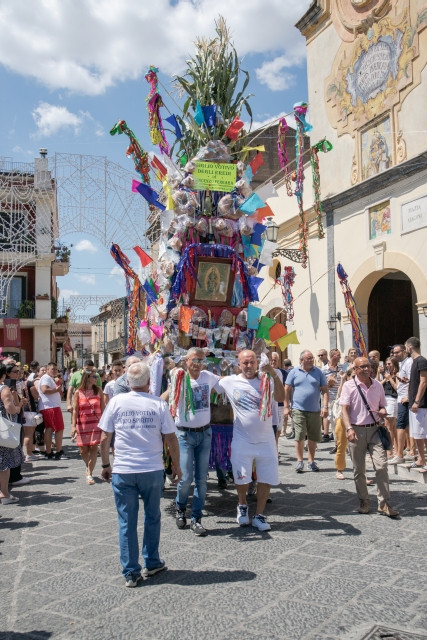
Festival at Santa Maria a Vico

== Culture ==
Every year, in August, a celebration takes place to honour the Aragon Kingdom: people march all over the historical centre of the town dressed in medieval clothes, playing all the different roles of the Aragon society: among the others, there are people impersonating peasants, servants, knights, and the King and the Queen themselves.

The town has many churches on its territory. In 1957, by decree of Pope Pius XII the Basilica of the Assumption of the Most Holy Mary was designated Minor Basilica. The importance of the church is determined by two main events: the first one dates back to the building of the religious edifice (1492), whereas the second one concerns a tradition handed down to this day. According to the legend the place where the church was built was chosen by Virgin Mary herself, who moved the bricks from their original position to the current one. She later appeared to the Queen Leonor de Alburquerque in a dream to confirm the new location of the church. The second event is connected to Virgin Mary as well: once every 25 years, the statue of the Virgin parades through the streets of the old parts of the town. This ceremony takes place on August 15, in order to celebrate the Assumption of Mary into Heaven.

== Main sights ==
The Basilica of the Assumption of the Most Holy Mary mentioned above is among the oldest monuments of the town: the original structure was realised in the Gothic style of the early 16th century; however, after the Baroque restoration of the church, which took place in the second half of the 1700s, only few Gothic elements survive, such as the bell tower and part of the facade. The cloister of the church stores up a marble replica of the Standards of the Aragon dynasty. After the earthquake of the 1730, the columns of the cloister were secured, with the addition of blocks to the original structure. Even though the church and the cloister were not built until 1492, the project of a church devoted to the Virgin Mary dates back to 1460, when Ferdinand I of Naples claimed that in case of victory over the Capetian House of Anjou, at the time set in Arienzo, he would have to erect a church. In 1480 he renewed his vow, praying for the Virgin to grant him another victory: this time the battle took place in Apulia, where his army was fighting the Turk invasion. The Aragonese army won on this occasion as well, yet despite his vows, Ferdinand I did not order the construction until 12 years later.

The Chiesa Parrocchiale di San Nicola Magno, the church dedicated to the patron saint of the town, was commissioned in 1762 by the then bishop of Sant'Agata de Goti, Sant'Alfonso de' Liguori, to replace the pre-existing church from the 17th century, Santa Maria la Nova.

In Piazza Umberto I, a square placed in the historical centre of the town, a number of statues evoking and celebrating the old crafts can be found: the majority of them were placed in the 1990s and have a private committee, but some date back to the 2010s, distancing themselves from the craft theme, and bearing the memory of the migration of many Italians in the post-war period.

In 2019, street art recalling the history, main monuments and personalities of Santa Maria a Vico was completed. The piece was created in partnership with students of the Giovanni XXIII institute, which also offered the wall used for the project.
