= Luigi Vanvitelli =

Italian architect (1700–1773)

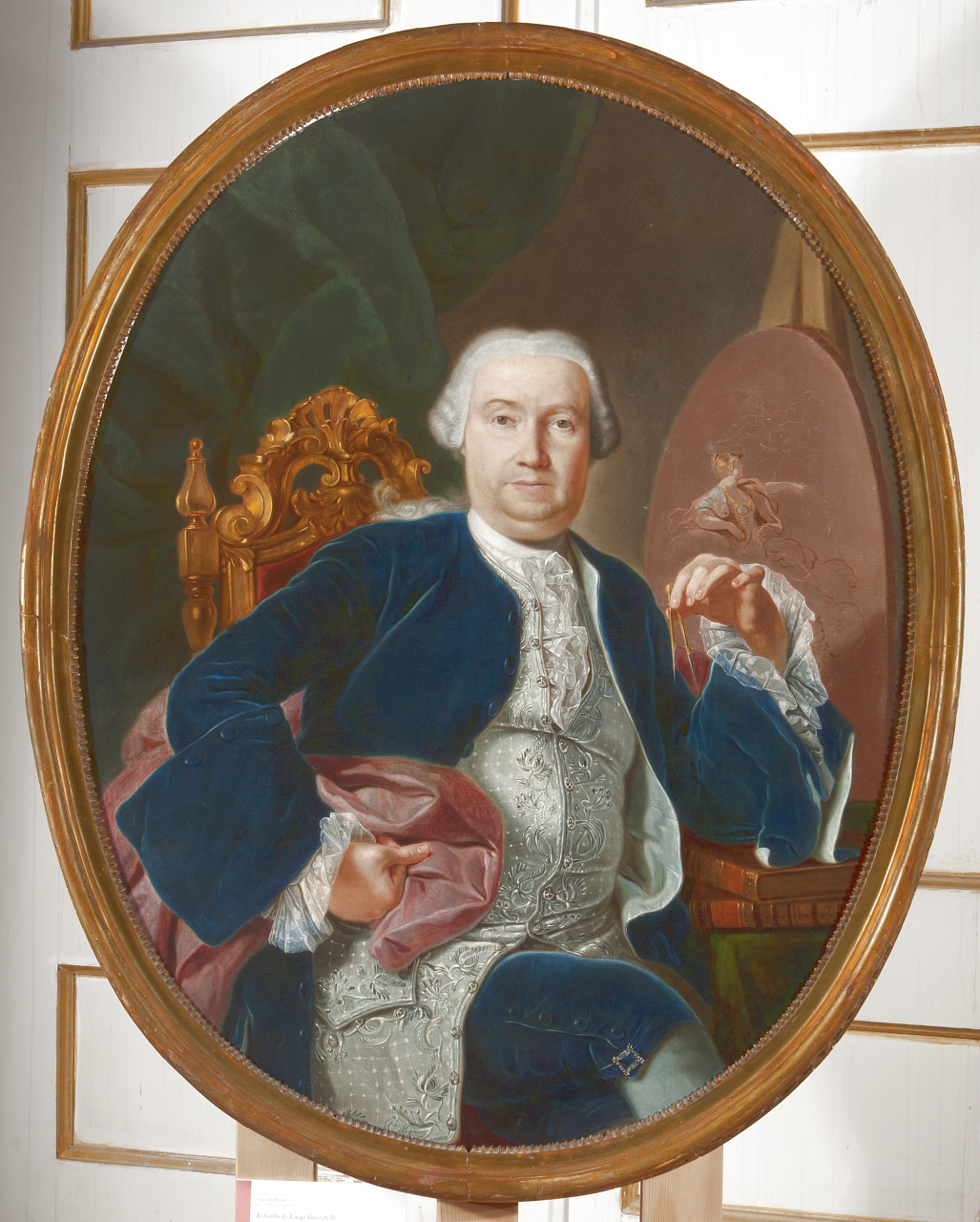
- Portrait by Giacinto Diano (1765)
- Born: 12 May 1700; Naples, Kingdom of Naples
- Died: 1 March 1773 (aged 72); Caserta, Kingdom of Naples
- Known for: Architecture, painting
- Notable work: Palace of Caserta; Chapel of Saint John the Baptist in the Igreja de São Roque; Aqueduct of Vanvitelli; Santissima Annunziata Maggiore, Naples
- Movement: Baroque and Neoclassicism

Signature
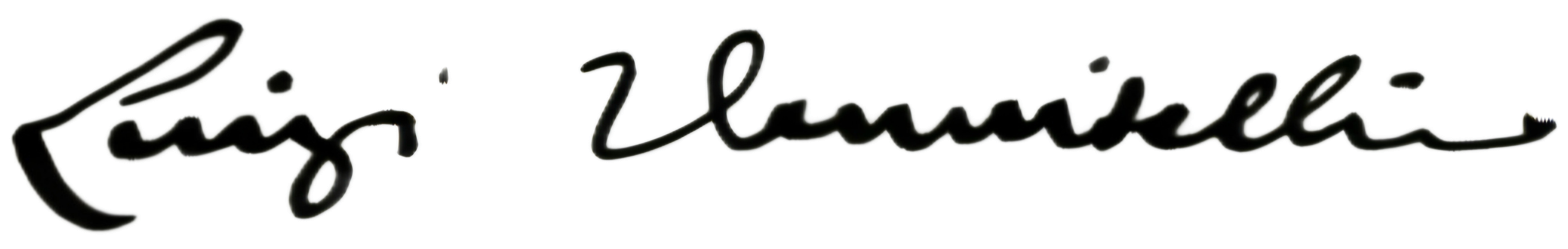

Luigi Vanvitelli (Italian pronunciation: [luˈiːdʒi vaɱviˈtɛlli]; 12 May 1700 – 1 March 1773), was an Italian architect and painter. The most prominent 18th-century architect of Italy, he practised a sober classicising academic Late Baroque style that made an easy transition to Neoclassicism.

== Biography ==
=== Early years and education ===
Vanvitelli was born in Naples, the son of an Italian woman, Anna Lorenzani, and a Dutch painter of land and cityscapes (veduta), Caspar van Wittel, who also used the name Vanvitelli. Luigi began his career as a history painter, and from 1724, he was employed as a copyist in the fabbrica of St Peter's in Rome. The extent of his academic training is not clear, but under Antonio Valeri (1648–1736), who succeeded Carlo Fontana as architetto soprastante, Vanvitelli discovered his talent as an architect. Ultimately, however, Valeri was a less significant influence on his work than Fontana or Filippo Juvarra. His first patron was the prefect Cardinal Annibale Albani. As a member of the latter's retinue, in the 1720s, Vanvitelli went to Urbino, where he participated in the decoration of the Albani Chapel (c. 1729) in the church of San Francesco (in situ), the staircase and corridors of the Palazzo Albani and the fountain in front of the palazzo. Although the extent of his involvement in the work is not known with certainty, these decorations with their isolation of fanciful single forms are clearly derived from the Roman Barocchetto of the early 18th century or directly from Borromini. Forms typical of Borromini, such as garlands, palm branches and herm pilasters, continue to appear discreetly throughout Vanvitelli's later work. Many drawings testify to Vanvitelli's interest, from the 1720s onwards, in designing decorative ceilings and ciboria. The early fountains, however, are in a restrained decorative style and are clearly executed. In Urbino he may also have been involved in building the churches of San Francesco and San Domenico.

=== Rome and the Papal States ===
In 1728, Vanvitelli became a member of the Academy of Arcadia, under the name Archimede Fidiaco. After being engaged in engineering works in and around Rome, designing the Vermicino aqueduct with a fountain (c. 1730) below Albano, in 1732, Vanvitelli won the competitions for the façade of the Basilica di San Giovanni in Laterano and the façade of Palazzo Poli behind the Trevi Fountain. These designs are of a monumental and academic character that is unusual for their date and in parts resemble the work of Vanvitelli's friend and collaborator Nicola Salvi. These designs led to Vanvitelli's being admitted to the Accademia di San Luca.

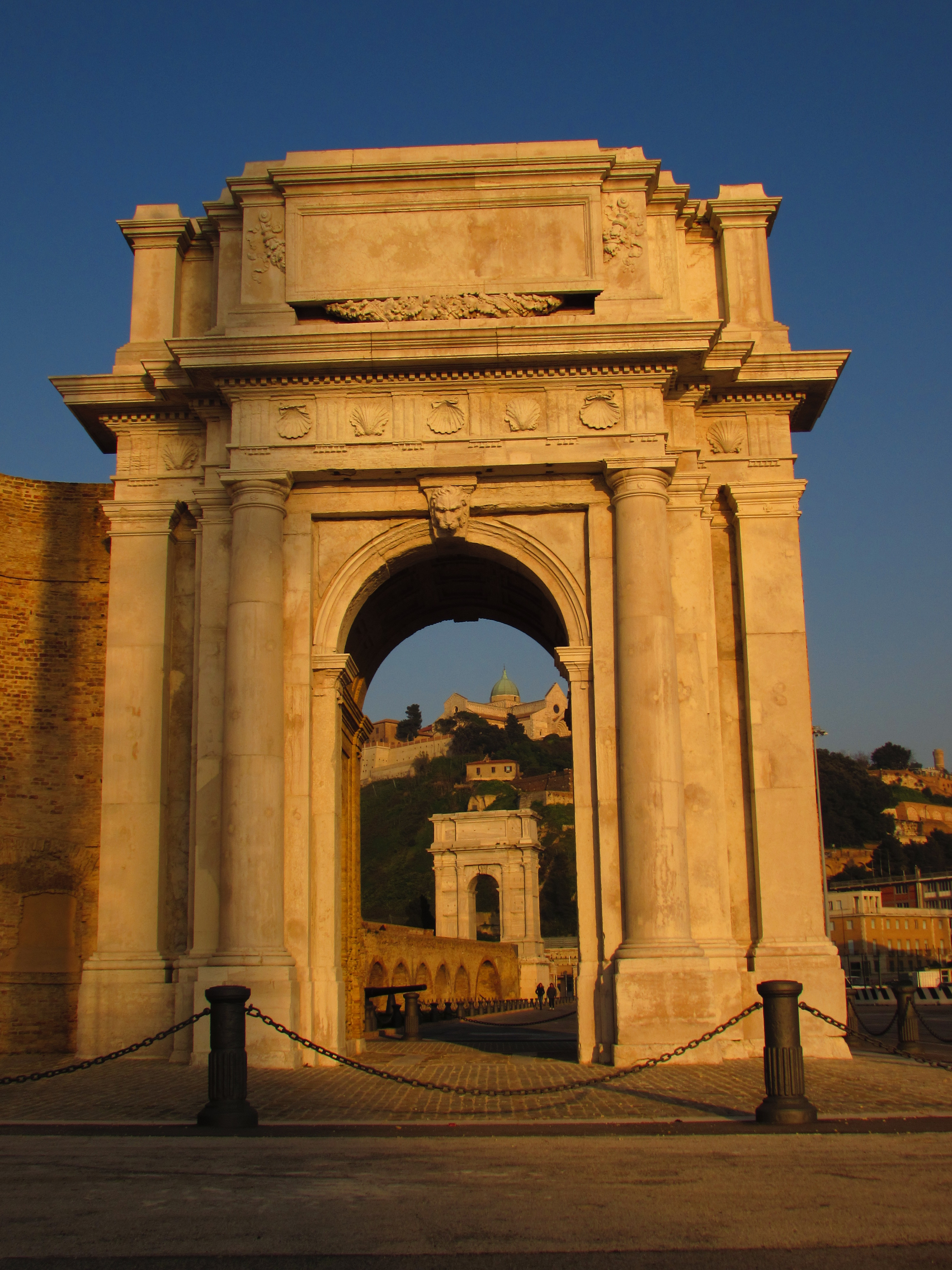
The Arco Clementino in Ancona

He was also commissioned to develop the port of Ancona by building a pentagonal lazaretto and lengthening the quay with a triumphal arch (from 1733 ), the Arco Clementino, in honour of Pope Clement XII. The lazaretto is a vast pentagonal building covering more than 20,000 square meters, built to protect the military defensive authorities from the risk of contagious diseases potentially reaching the town with the ships.

Subsequently, for the most part in the service of the Apostolic Camera, Vanvitelli acquired wide experience in the Marche and Umbria, both in engineering projects and in architecture, including the construction in Ancona of Il Gesù (the Jesuit church, completed 1743) and the reliquary chapel (1739) in the cathedral there. In the lazaretto and its chapel, in the Arco Clementino and in the façade of Il Gesù, Vanvitelli arrived for the first time at his own style, characterized by concise, harmoniously modulated reliefs and displaying the ability to take on very diverse kinds of work and use them as a basis for invention.

Among his other works of this period are the construction of the church and monastery of Montemorcino (1739–62; now the university) for the Olivetan Order in Perugia. In the interior here, with its centralizing longitudinal space inspired by Andrea Palladio, he achieved for the first time the clarity and plasticity characteristic of his mature work and in contrast to his previous church designs, in which he had experimented with designs in a rather unsatisfactory manner; important motifs were columns and pendentive domes with ribs and coffers in the manner of Bernini.

During the 1740s, Vanvitelli became increasingly active in Rome. Although originally subordinate to Filippo Barigioni, he began to take over the effective direction of the fabbrica of St Peter's, arguing for the highly controversial restoration of the dome, which he executed in 1742–8, in accordance with the calculations of the mathematician Giovanni Poleni. With Nicola Salvi he also carried out the enlargement (c. 1745) of the Palazzo Chigi-Odescalchi, doubling the width of the central section and thereby upsetting the finely balanced proportions of Bernini's original scheme.

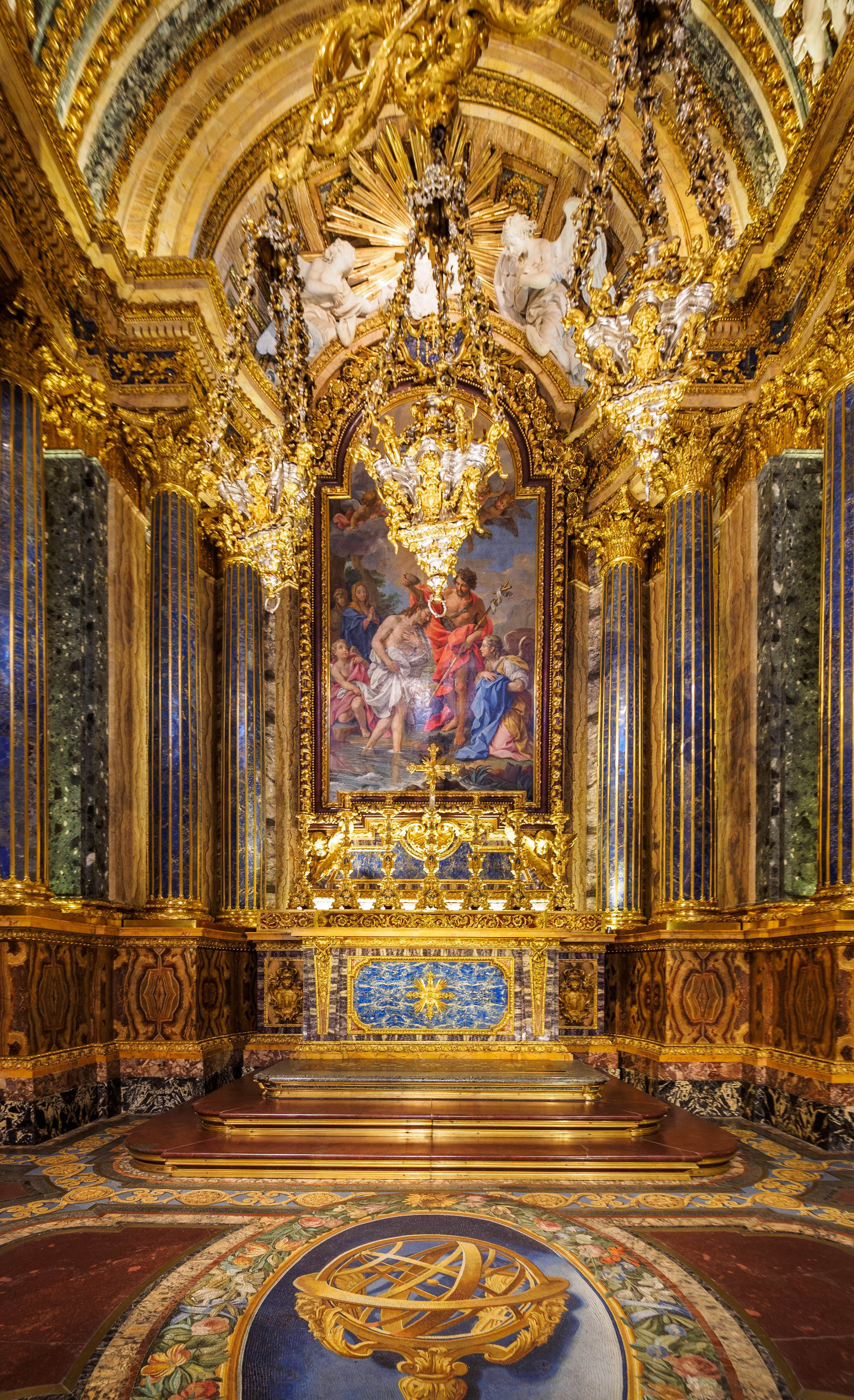
The Chapel of Saint John the Baptist in the Igreja de São Roque

He also collaborated with Salvi on the design, execution and furnishing of St John's Chapel for the Jesuit Igreja de São Roque in Lisbon, which was built in Rome between 1743 and 1745, disassembled in 1747, and shipped to Lisbon, where it was reassembled. It was completed in 1750, although the mosaics in it were not finished until 1752. St John's Chapel is an extreme example of material splendour encased in a strict architectonic form. Built of many precious marbles and other costly stones, as well as gilt bronze, it was held to be the most expensive chapel in Europe up to that time. In 1745, he was also commissioned to design a façade for Milan Cathedral, but his plans (preserved) were not executed.

Also in the 1740s, Vanvitelli restored the Villa Rufinella (1741–5) at Frascati for the Jesuits and began a collaboration with the Augustinians that continued into the 1750s and included the construction of the sacristy and large monastery (1746–56) of Sant'Agostino in Rome, the construction of Sant'Agostino in Siena (1747–55; only the nave built according to his plans), the construction of Sant'Agostino in Ancona (1760–64), and the restoration of Sant'Agostino in Rome (from 1756 ). The exterior of the monastery is particularly austere. Inside, however, Vanvitelli gave rein to his decorative imagination; particularly interesting architectural features are the courtyard with Renaissance-style windows set in arcades and the vestibule of the side entrance.

His most spectacular work in Rome, however, was the reworking of Michelangelo’s Carthusian church of Santa Maria degli Angeli (1748–65), where he converted the nave into a transept, relocating the entrance on the west side. Here – as at Sant'Agostino, Rome, and in his plans for the modernization (1750–54) of Foligno Cathedral – Vanvitelli was inspired by the halls of Roman baths (thermae), and he conferred the most elaborate decoration on the tepidarium of what had formerly been the Baths of Diocletian, which Michelangelo had left unadorned.

=== Royal Palace of Caserta ===
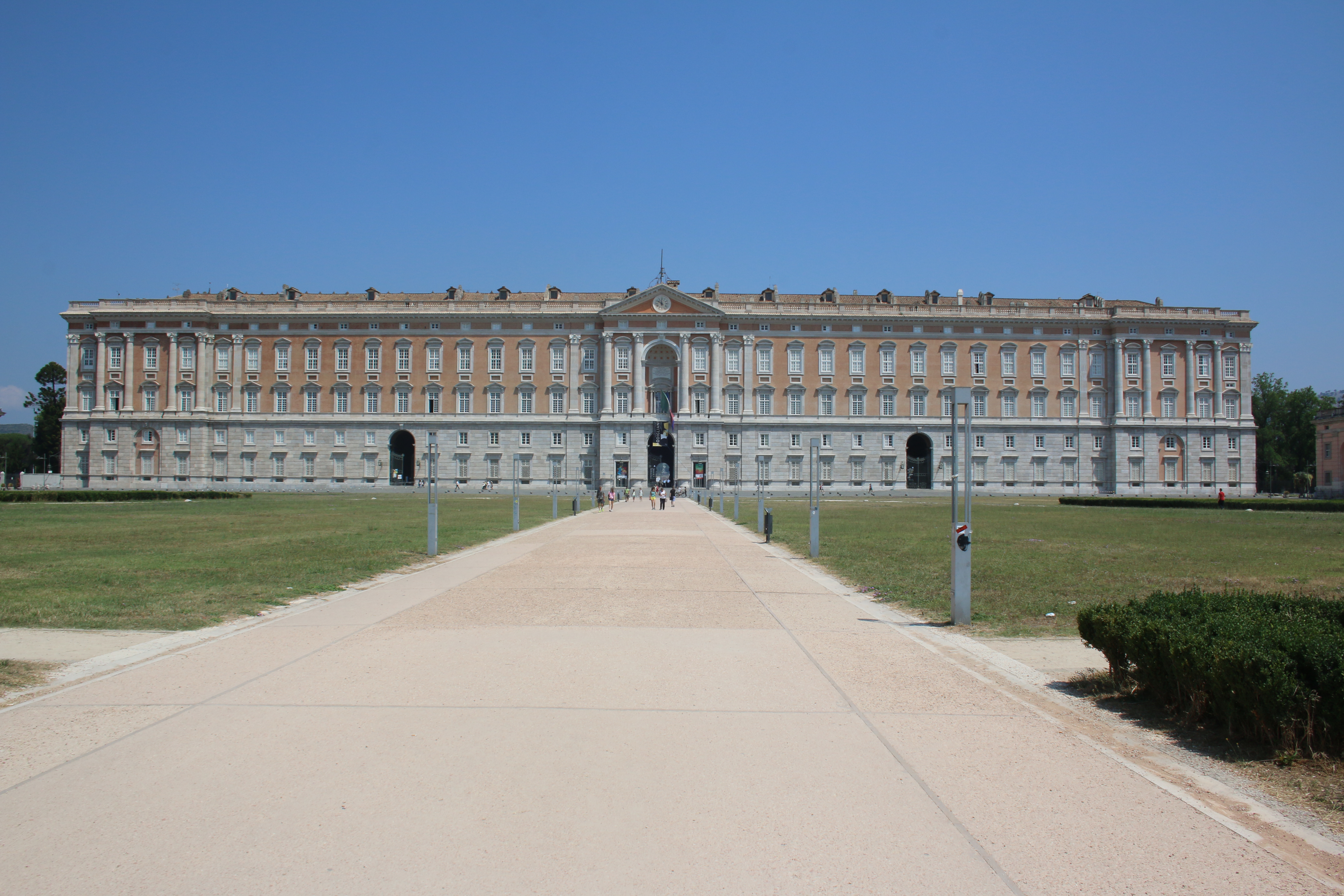
Façade

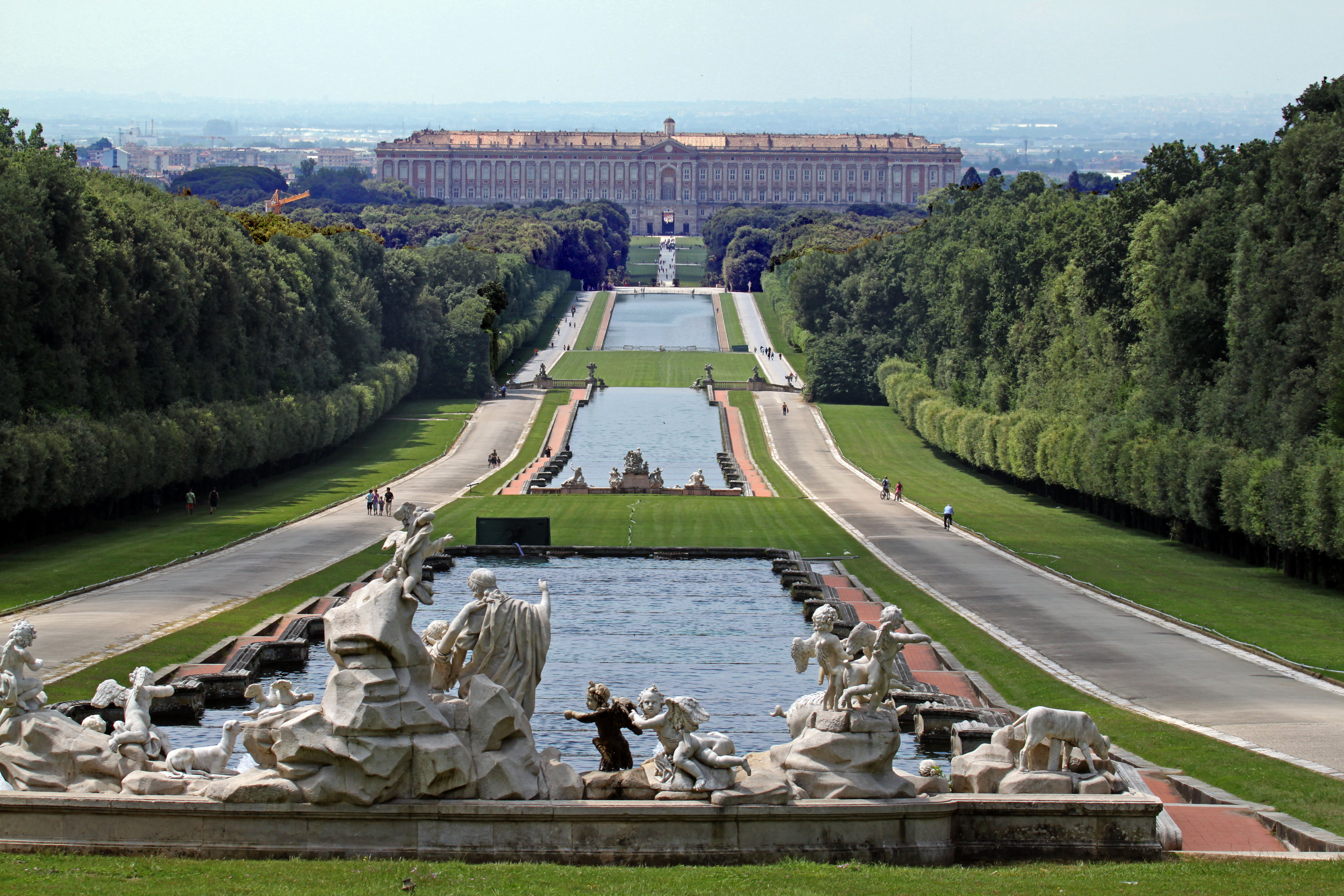
Garden Facade

In 1750, Charles VII, King of Naples, later Charles III of Spain, summoned Vanvitelli, and in 1751 the planning of the Royal Palace of Caserta, 33 km north of Naples, was basically completed. The most important part of Vanvitelli's remaining career was devoted to supervising the work there. He himself was responsible for the completion of the palace's staircase, chapel and theatre (not part of the original plans); the first of the state apartments and the fountains in the garden were executed to his plans after his death. The Royal Palace is an enormous block (253×190 m), and despite the overall simplicity of its appearance it is a complex creation. Some of its basic ideas are derived, thanks to Charles III, from Spanish and French Bourbon palaces: in particular the ground-plan with its four internal courtyards formed by crossed wings is derived from Robert de Cotte’s unexecuted projects for the Casón del Buen Retiro, Madrid, while the chapel is influenced by that at Versailles. The functional and rational working out of the plan (for example, the placing of the staircase and the chapel), however, are Vanvitelli's distinctive contribution. The radiating visual effect of the upper central vestibule (including the splayed corners of the courtyards) is splendid, as is the visual axis extending from the road through the centre of the palace and the length of the entire park; both are ideas derived from Vanvitelli's experiments with scenography. Further scenographic effects are achieved with the majestic staircase, which opens from the central octagon.

=== Other buildings in Naples ===
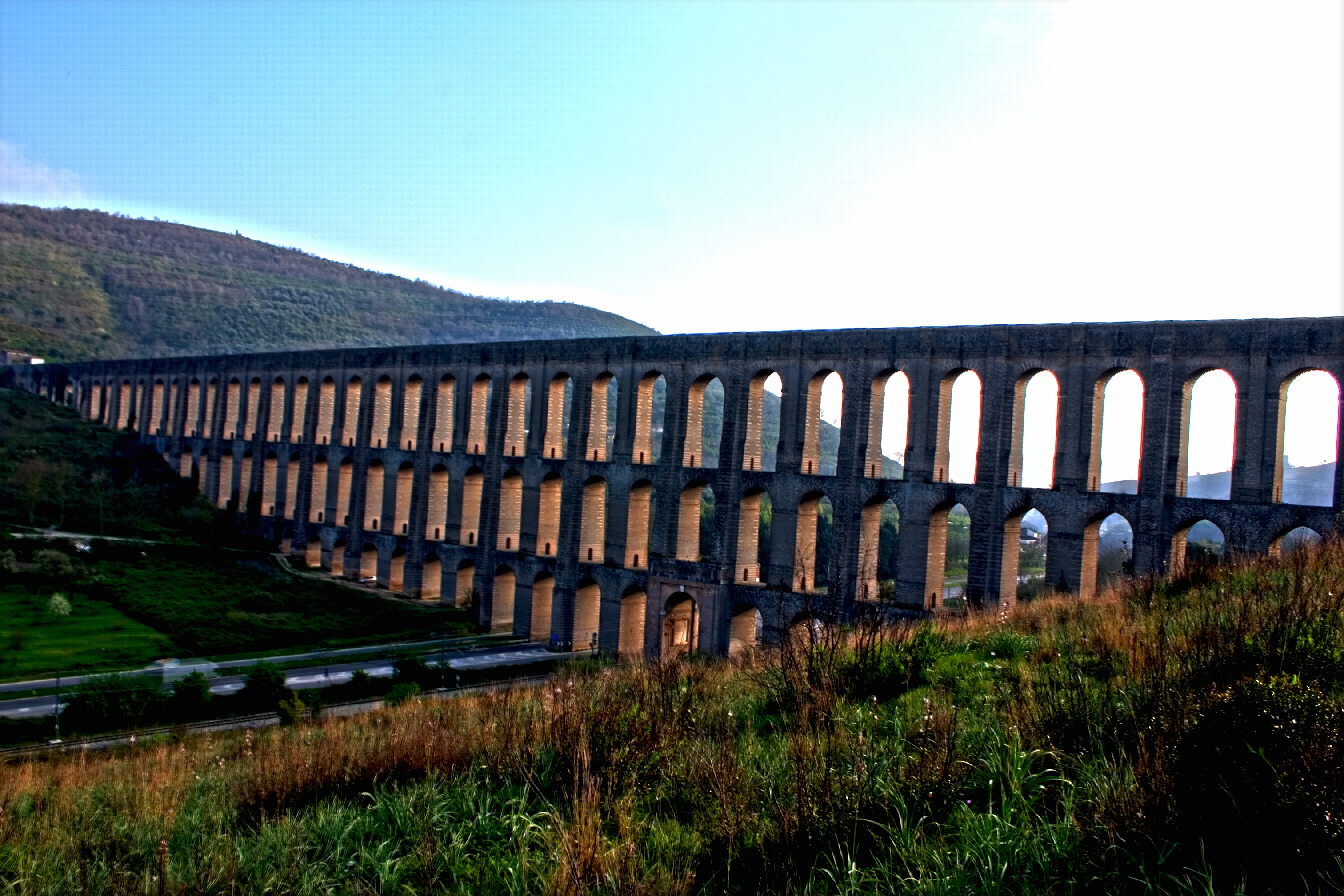
Aqueduct of Vanvitelli

Subsequently, Vanvitelli was engaged in numerous civil engineering and technical works, including the aqueduct for the gardens at Caserta, with the tunnelling works and the archi della Valle (1753–69). He also completed the barracks begun by military engineers at the Ponte della Maddalena on the outskirts of Naples (from 1754). Here the ennoblement of a utilitarian building by the application of geometry and a unifying order demonstrate Vanvitelli's affinities with early Neoclassicism. His next major scheme, undertaken as court architect, was the Foro Carolino in Naples (from 1758; now the Piazza Dante), a hemicycle backed by a curved building with a palace front that is articulated by a giant Tuscan order, interrupted in the centre by a nicchione that originally held an equestrian statue of Charles III. This statue was commissioned in 1761. Although never executed in bronze, a plaster model was set up in 1765 and destroyed in 1799. The use of a colonnade here again foreshadows Neoclassicism.

Another important project in Naples was the rebuilding from 1760 of the basilica of Santissima Annunziata, which had been damaged by fire in 1757, and the church of the Albergo dei Poveri, under royal patronage. Here Vanvitelli produced a splendid variation on the theme of the large aisleless church with side chapels, an amply architraved colonnade and dome. The church also has a characteristic concave façade in two tiers; in addition there is a striking crypt with a circular colonnade. In Naples he was also involved in work on the Calabritto and Casacalenda palaces, and he drew up plans for the Palazzo d’Angri; he also completed the Villa Campolieto (after 1762) at Ercolano. Apart from Santissima Annunziata, however, his ecclesiastical works in Naples were few: the building of the Vincentian missionary church in Via Vergini (from c. 1760); the decoration of Santi Marcellino e Festo (c. 1765), with the oratory of the Scala Santa (1772); and the sacristy of San Luigi in Palazzo (completed in 1766). Santi Marcellino e Festo has the appearance of being sheathed in coloured marble, with elegant decorative details. Generally, however, Vanvitelli's later style is characterized by a reductive and more abstract resumption of old themes with strict organization, chiefly by means of flat pilasters and lesenes: for example in the oratory of the Scala Santa, the staircase and vestibule of the Villa Campolieto and, above all, the scenographic sequence of three central spaces (the middle one of which is inspired by the Roman church of Santa Maria in Montesanto) in the Vincentian missionary church and monastery, where the influence of Borromini is also evident.

Throughout his career, Vanvitelli made important designs for altars and tabernacles, notable examples of which include the high altar of Terni Cathedral (1751–4), executed with Carlo Murena (1713–64); the high altar of San Pantaleo in Rome (1751–68); and the altar of the Sampajo Chapel in Sant'Antonio dei Portoghesi, Rome (1752–6).

=== Later life ===
He was also commissioned to produce a design for the grand staircase (1745) of the Royal Palace of Madrid, and in 1769, he went to Milan for the replanning of the Palazzo Regio-ducale; during his visit he also provided plans for the Loggia dei Commercianti in Brescia and for private dwellings. In his last years there were important opportunities for festive architecture. He designed a false façade and temporary grand hall for the Palazzo Teora (for the Austrian Ambassador) in 1768, on the betrothal of Ferdinand IV to Maria Carolina of Austria, and for the Spanish Ambassador in 1772, when the King's first son was born. Again, Vanvitelli's treatment of festive decorations as ideal architecture with antique overtones can be regarded as an early example of Neoclassicism. Vanvitelli died at Caserta in 1773.

== Legacy ==
Vanvitelli's work represents the transition from Baroque to Neoclassicism, and his correspondence and the number of his extant drawings make him perhaps the best-documented Italian architect of the 18th century. After his death, he continued to be regarded as the greatest architect of his day. His pupils did much to disseminate his style, especially Giuseppe Piermarini in Lombardy, his son Carlo Vanvitelli in Naples, Carlo Murena in Rome, Francesco Sabatini in Spain and Antonio Rinaldi in Russia, and his own contribution is sometimes difficult to distinguish from those of his immediate successors in Naples and Rome. His work can nevertheless be characterized by the recurrent use of some distinctive elements: concave forms (as in such church façades as Santa Maria degli Angeli and the Santissima Annunziata in Naples or Il Gesù in Ancona); reinforcing arches and coffers; lunettes or oval medallions in the vaulted areas and over the doors; and, in his decorative details, seashell-shaped niches and motifs derived from Borromini. He also made frequent use of columns, but always taking into consideration the architectural context rather than seeing them as absolute values.

== Gallery ==
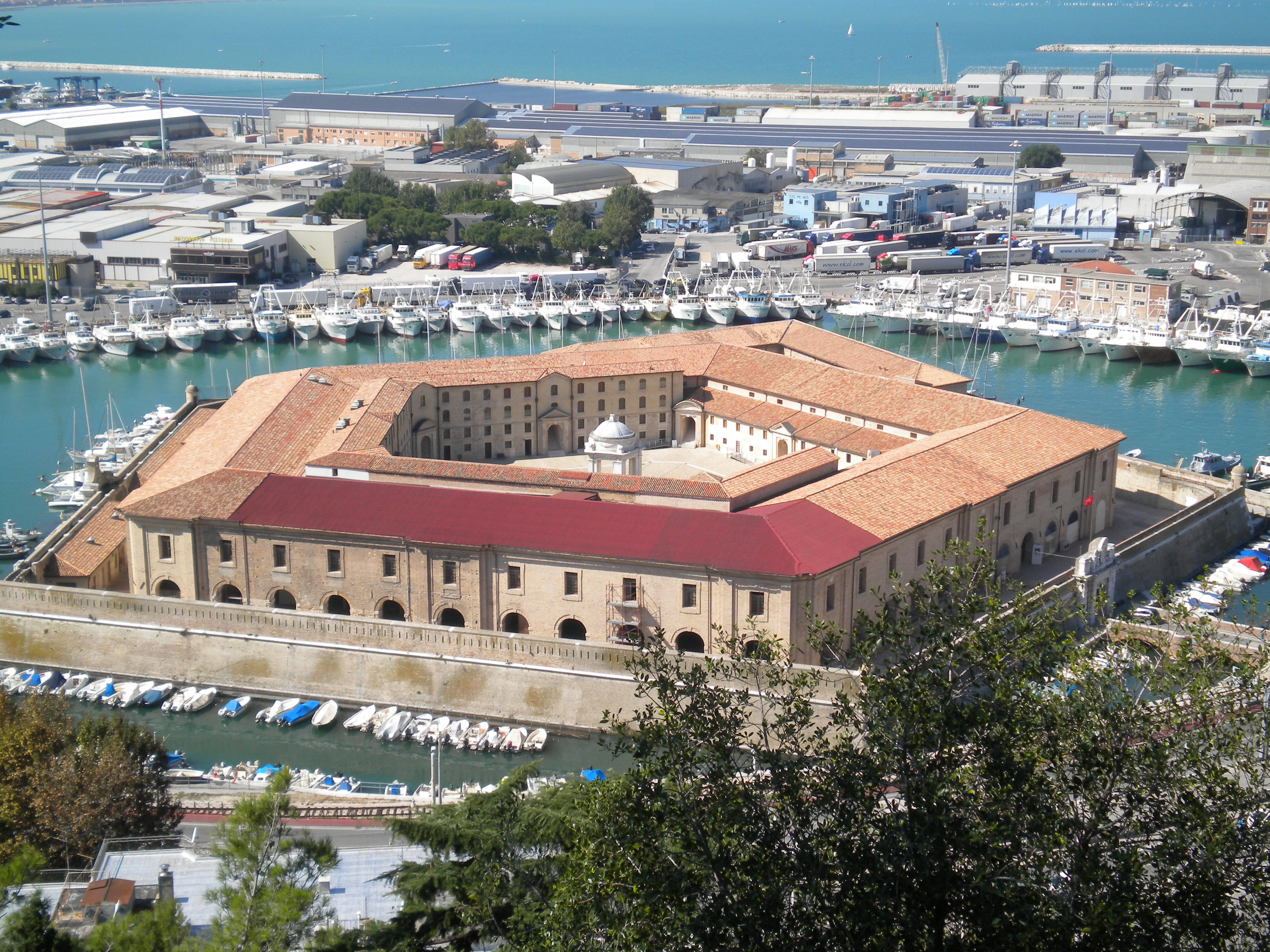
The Lazzaretto of Ancona

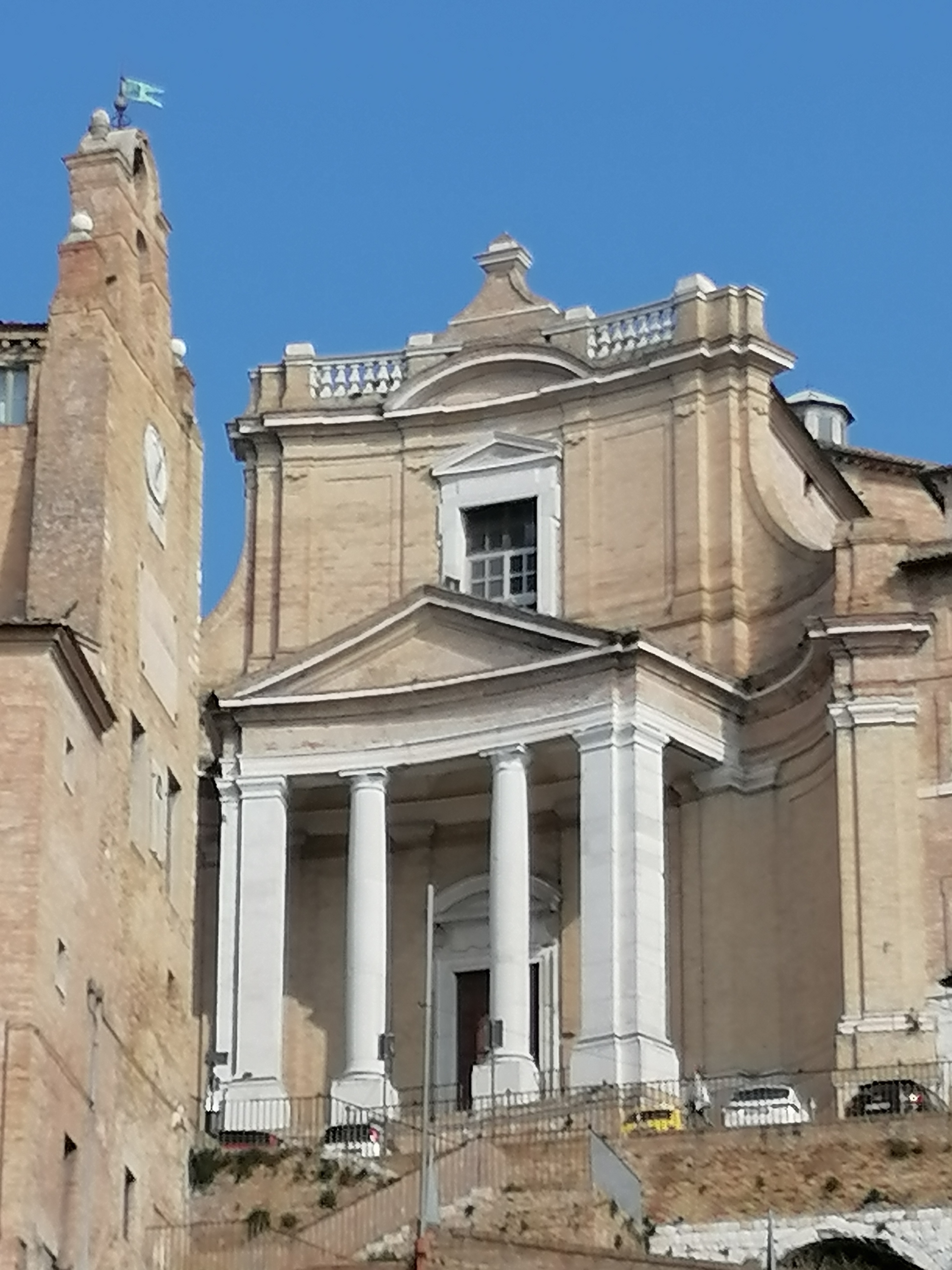
The Chiesa del Gesù, Ancona

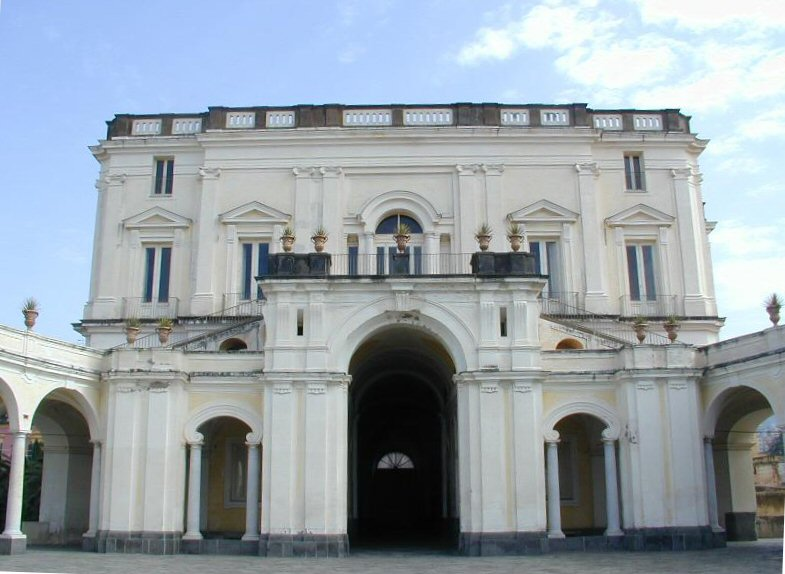
Villa Campolieto, Ercolano

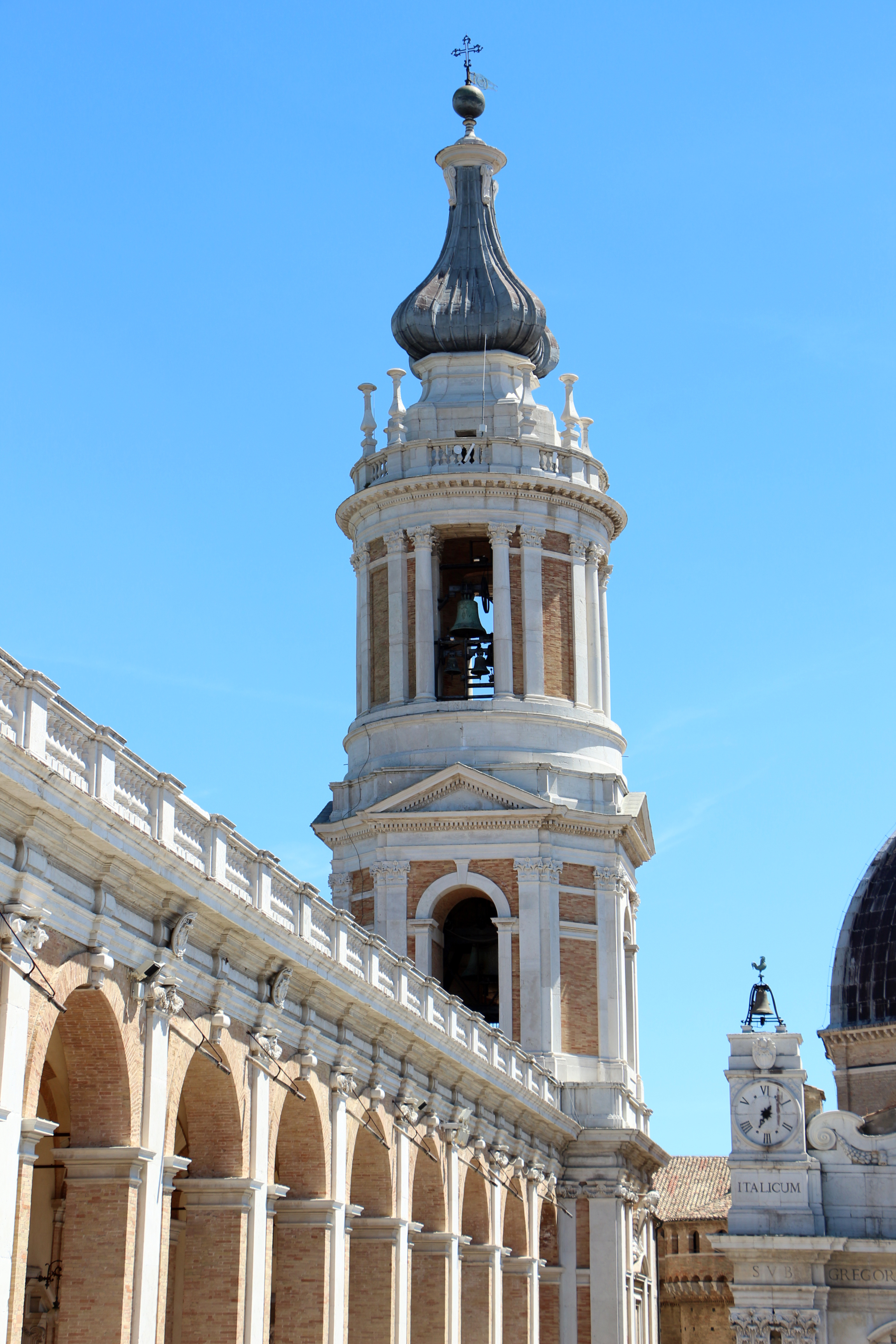
Bell tower of the Basilica della Santa Casa, Loreto

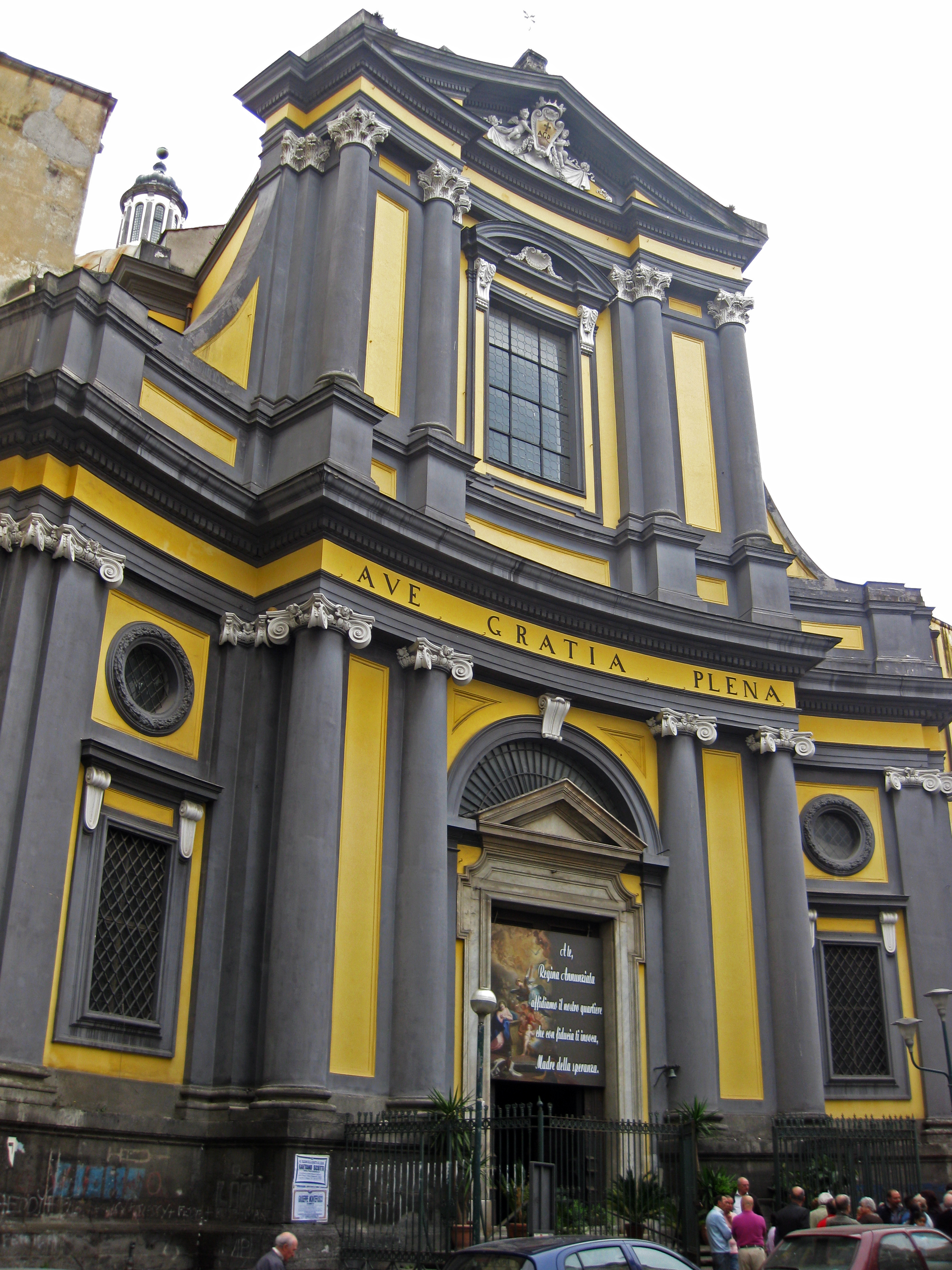
Basilica della Santissima Annunziata Maggiore, Naples

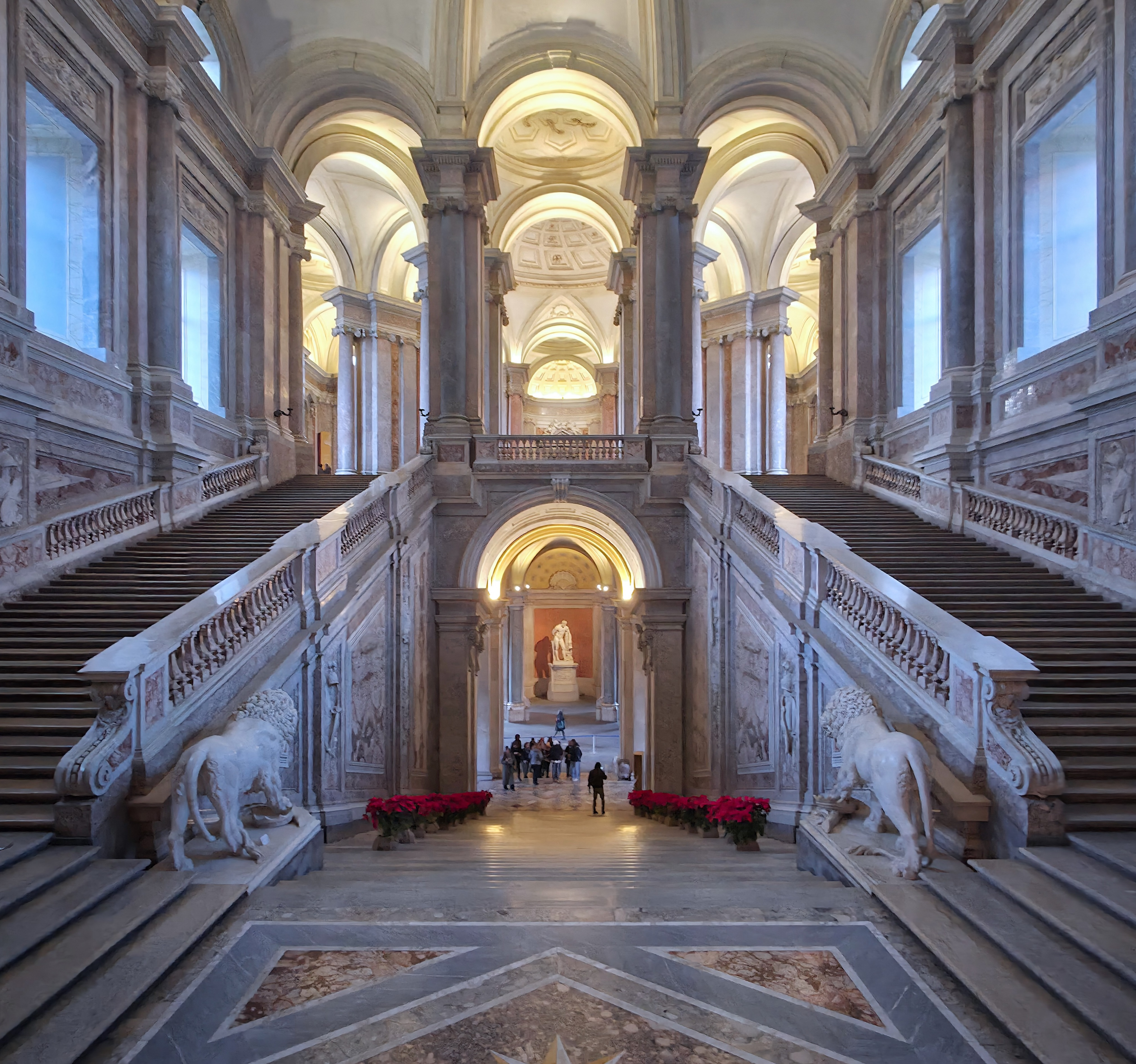
Grand Staircase of Honour of The Royal Palace of Caserta

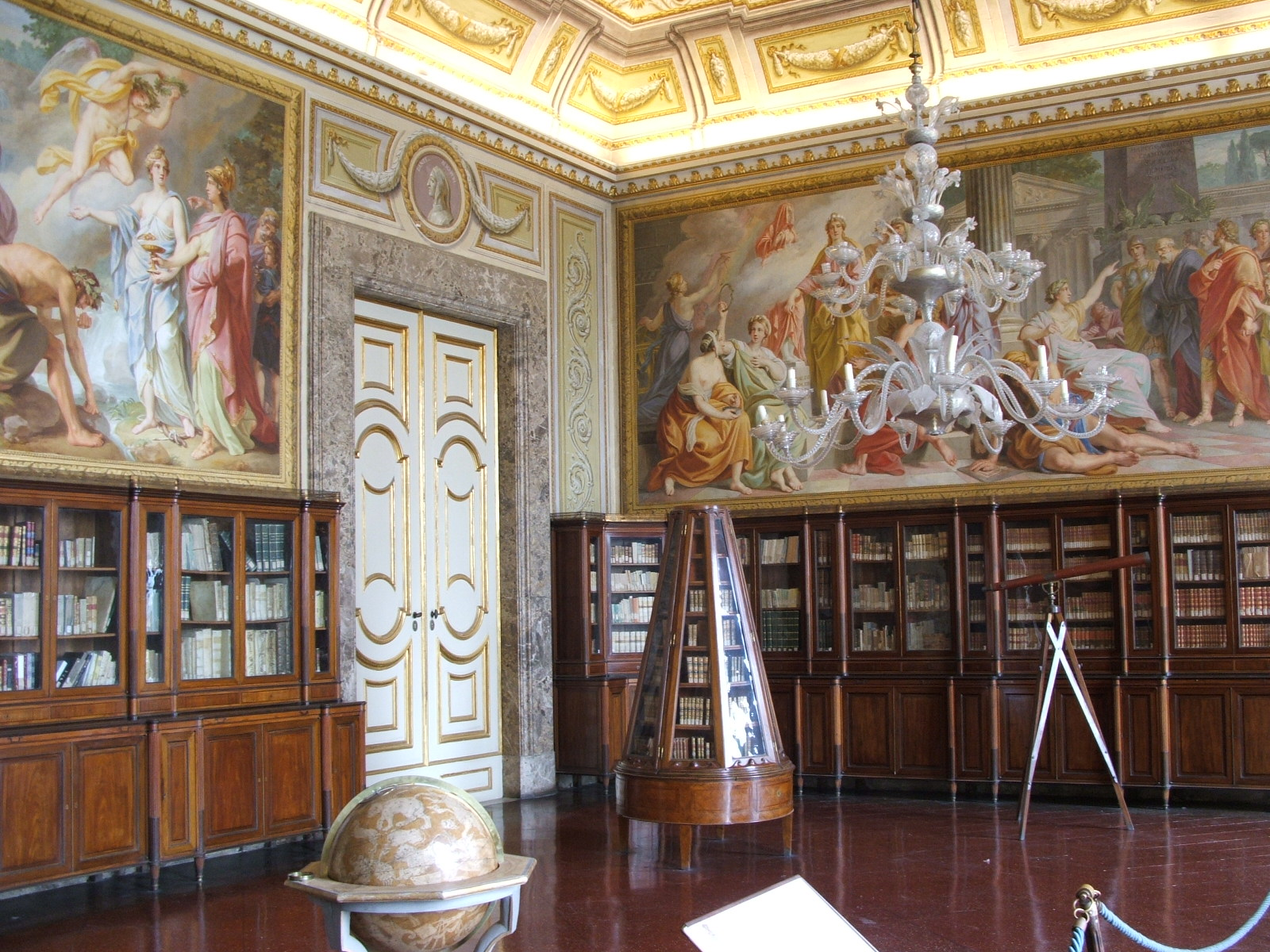
The Palatine Library

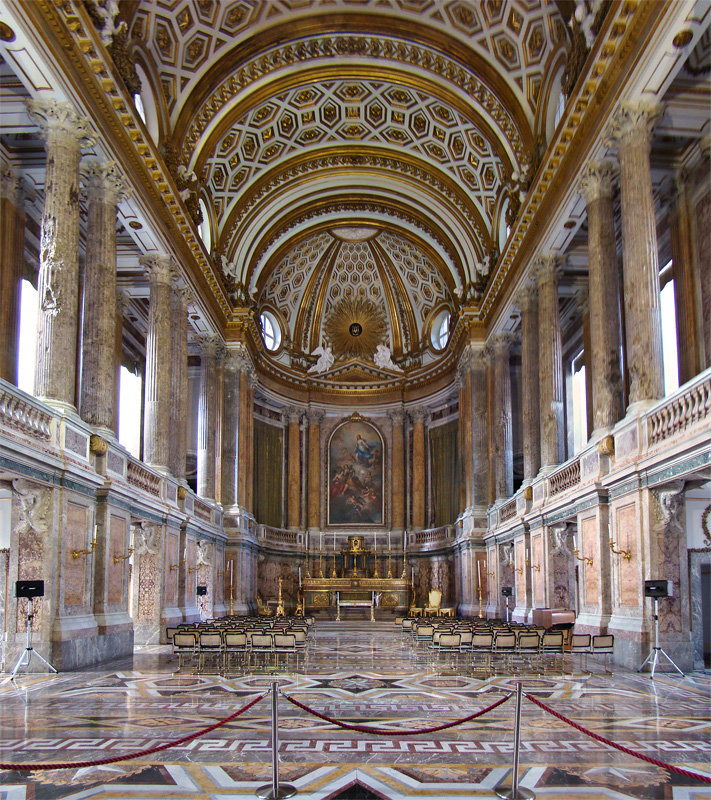
The Palatine Chapel

== Writings ==
- Dichiarazione dei disegni del Reale Palazzo di Caserta. Naples: nella Regia Stamperia. 1756.
- F. Strazzullo, ed. (1976). Le lettere di Luigi Vanvitelli nella biblioteca palatina di Caserta. 3 vols. Galatina: Congedo.

== Bibliography ==
- Fichera, F. (1937). Luigi Vanvitelli. Rome: Reale Accademia d'Italia.
- Garms, J. (1971). "Die Briefe des Luigi Vanvitelli an seinen Bruder Urbano in Rom: Kunsthistorisches Material". Römische historische Mitteilungen. 13: 201–85.
- Garms, J. (1974). "Altäre und Tabernakel von Luigi Vanvitelli". Wiener Jahrbuch für Kunstgeschichte. 27: 140–57. doi:10.7767/wjk.1974.27.1.140.
- Garms, J. (1974). "Beiträge zu Vanvitellis Leben, Werk und Milieu". Römische historische Mitteilungen. 16: 107–90.
- de’ Seta, C. (1974). "I disegni di Luigi Vanvitelli per la reggia di Caserta ed i progetti di Carlo Fontana per il palazzo del principe di Liechtenstein". Storia dell'arte. 22: 267–76.
- L'attività di Luigi Vanvitelli nelle Marche e i suoi epigoni: Convegno vanvitelliano. Ancona: Deputazione di storia patria per le Marche. 1974.
- Fiengo, G. (1976). Gioffredo e Vanvitelli nei palazzi dei Casacalenda. Naples: Editoriale scientifica.
- de’ Seta, C. (1978). "Luigi Vanvitelli: L'antico ed il neoclassico". Prospettiva. 15 (15): 40–46. JSTOR 24413205.
- Thomas, R.L. (2010). "From the Library to the Printing Press: Luigi Vanvitelli's Life with Books". Journal of the Society of Architectural Historians. 69 (4): 508–533. doi:10.1525/jsah.2010.69.4.508.
