= Santa Maria delle Grazie =

Santa Maria delle Grazie (St. Mary of Graces) may refer to:

- Our Lady of Graces, a devotion to the Virgin Mary in the Roman Catholic Church

== Churches in Italy ==
- Santa Maria delle Grazie, Alcamo
- Santa Maria delle Grazie, Arezzo
- Santa Maria delle Grazie, Brescia
- Santa Maria delle Grazie, Este
- Santa Maria delle Grazie, Foce di Amelia
- Santa Maria delle Grazie, Loro Piceno
- Santa Maria delle Grazie, Milan
- Santa Maria delle Grazie, Montefiascone
- Santa Maria delle Grazie, Pesaro
- Santa Maria delle Grazie, Pistoia
- Santa Maria delle Grazie, Riccia
- Santa Maria delle Grazie, San Severino Marche
- Santa Maria delle Grazie, Scandriglia
- Santa Maria delle Grazie, Senigallia
- Santa Maria delle Grazie, Varallo
- Santa Maria delle Grazie a Capodimonte, Naples
- Santa Maria delle Grazie a Mondragone, Naples
- Santa Maria delle Grazie a Toledo, Naples
- Santa Maria delle Grazie a Via Trionfale, Rome
- Santa Maria delle Grazie alle Fornaci fuori Porta Cavalleggeri, Rome
- Santa Maria delle Grazie di Montevergine, Palermo
- Santa Maria delle Grazie Maggiore a Caponapoli, Naples
- Basilica of Santa Maria delle Grazie, Cortemaggiore

== Other structures ==
- Santa Maria delle Grazie Tower, a watchtower in Xgħajra, Malta
