= Jacobello del Fiore =

Italian painter (c. 1370 – 1439)

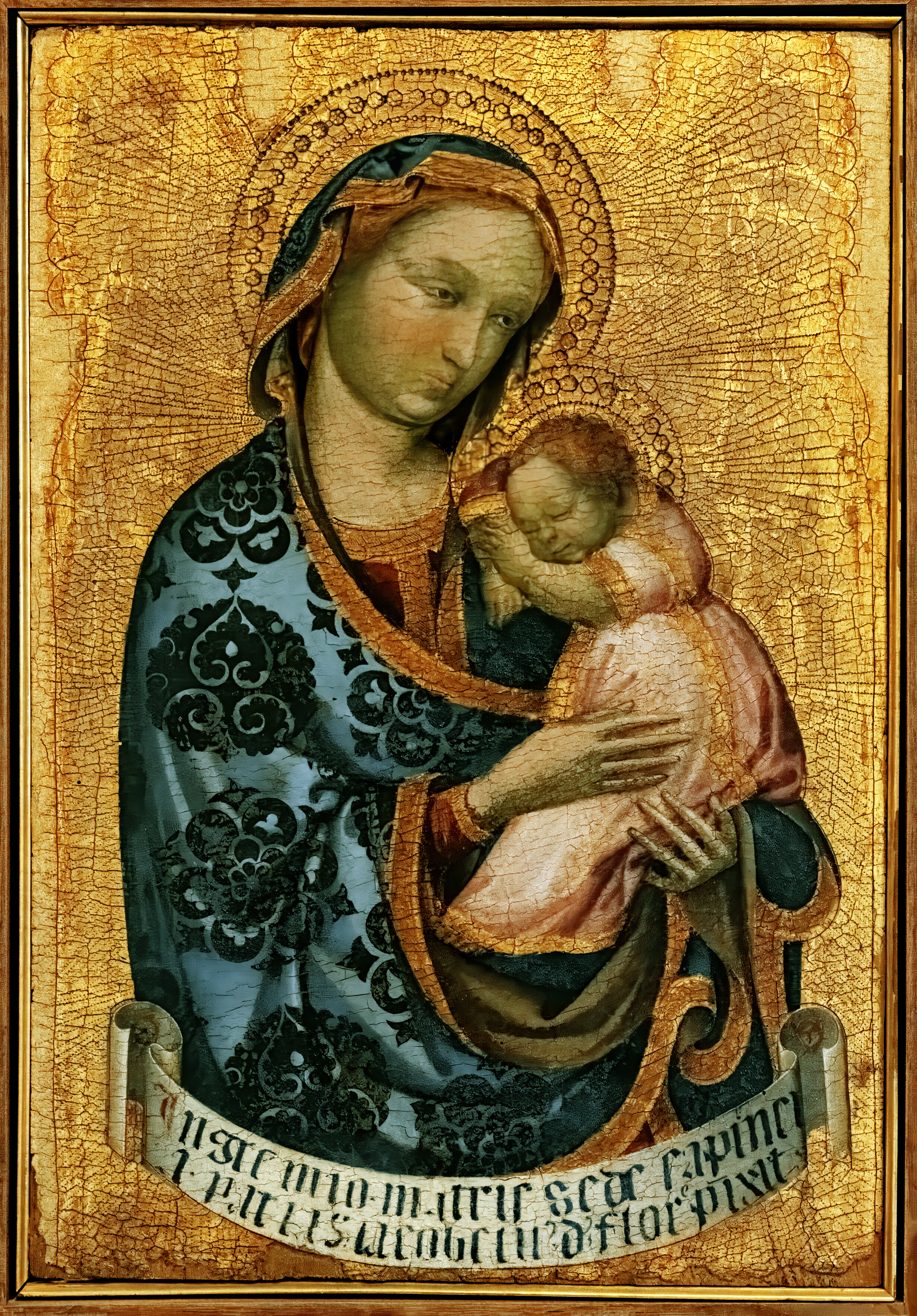
- Del Fiore's Virgin and Child, c. 1410, Museo Correr
- Born: c. 1370
- Died: 1439
- Known for: Painting
- Style: Gothic early in career, became more modern
- Movement: Renaissance

Jacobello del Fiore (c. 1370 – 1439) was a Venetian painter in the late fourteenth century and early fifteenth century. His early work is in the Late Gothic style popularized by Altichiero da Verona and Jacopo Avanzi, two of his contemporaries, while his mature work displays a local Venetian style established by the school of Paolo Veneziano, an artist and workshop proprietor with notable Byzantine inspiration in his work. This stylistic return to his roots sets him apart from Niccolò di Pietro and Zanino di Pietro, Venetian contemporaries he is often associated with. During his lifetime, he received commissions primarily on the Adriatic coast and in Venice.

== Early life and works ==
=== Birth and family ===
Jacobello del Fiore is likely to have been born around 1375, since by the time of his marriage in 1394, he was still under the tutelage of his father, Francesco del Fiore. While it is known that Jacobello del Fiore was married in 1394, the identity of his spouse is unknown, as is whether or not he had children. Jacobello's father, Francesco, was a painter himself: in 1376 he is documented in a contract as the chief officer of the confraternity, or organization dedicated to recognizing Christian works of charity, Scuola dei Pittori. Francesco headed a workshop that included Jacobello and his two brothers, Nicola (who died in 1404, when Jacobello was in his twenties or thirties) and Pietro.

=== The "Master of the Giovaneli Madonna" ===
While Jacobello's earliest surviving and confirmed work is dated in 1407, he is thought to be the painter of a Crucifixion piece in the Matthiesen Collection and the Virgin and Child of Piazzo Giovaneli, both painted in the late 14th century. The Crucifix was a common theme in Jacobello's earliest works, though as a subject it was a fairly common focus of many painters at the time. Art historian Andrea de Marchi was the first to suggest that a single author was responsible for these 'neo-giottoesque' paintings inspired by mainland painters Altichiero and Jacopo Avanzi and coined the author's unknown name as "Master of the Giovaneli Madonna". In the Matthiesen Crucifixion, Christ hangs on his cross in the center of the scene, dividing the followers of Christ on the left with the soldiers on the right. These details reveal that the author of the painting must have been familiar with the Late Gothic movement of the mainland and had Venetian training as well, due to the depiction of Longinus who lances Christ and the centurion who orders Christ's legs to be broken, two figures that also appear in Altichiero's Crucifixion in the Oratorio di San Giorgio, and also the city wall that closes the scene, a technique used by Paolo Veneziano. Similarly, art historian Carlo Volpe noted that a series of small Passion panels painted in the 1390s––Agony in the Garden (Vatican Picture Gallery), Lamentation (Vatican Picture Gallery), Way to Calvary (British Royal Collection), and Arrest of Christ (private collection)––share a Paduan influence and stylistic similarity with that of the Matthiesen Crucifixion." De Marchi also attributes The Madonna of Humility in a provincial museum in Lecce to the "Master of the Giovaneli Madonna", thus connecting this work with the Matthiesen Crucifixion and the Passion panels as well.

In 1401, Jacobello sent a polyptych, which has since been lost, to the church of San Cassiano in Pesaro, where it was seen by the 18th-century art historian Luigi Lanzi. The Madonna of Humility in Lecce, according to art historian Illeana Chiappini di Sorio, may well have belonged to this polyptych. Thus, the Madonna of Humility, as hypothesized by art historian Daniele Benati, connects all of the above works by the "Master of the Giovaneli Madonna" to none other than Jacobello del Fiore.

=== A progression in style ===
The year 1401 marks a transition in Jacobello's career from a more archaic, gothic style, utilized in the last decade of the Trecento and captured in the Matthiesen Crucifixion, to a more modern style concerned with line, as seen in the Giovaneli Madonna and Crucifixion with Mourners and Saints in a French private collection. The latter, as De Marchi emphasizes, still derives from Altichiero and Jacopo Avanzi but moves beyond the sterner style of the Matthiesen Crucifixion by employing a looser Gothic flexibility. Both these works were probably painted between 1401 and 1407, the date of Jacobello's first surviving, verified painting.

The Matthiesen Crucifixion contains allusions to Jerusalem and to biblical imagery such as the Golgotha, the location where Jesus was crucified. The older gothic style that Jacobello often used, exemplified by the Matthiesen Crucifixion, is characterized by distinct composition and posing of figures in front or side view, sweeping lines, and vivid colors, though the scheme of the Matthiesen Crucifixion is especially bright.

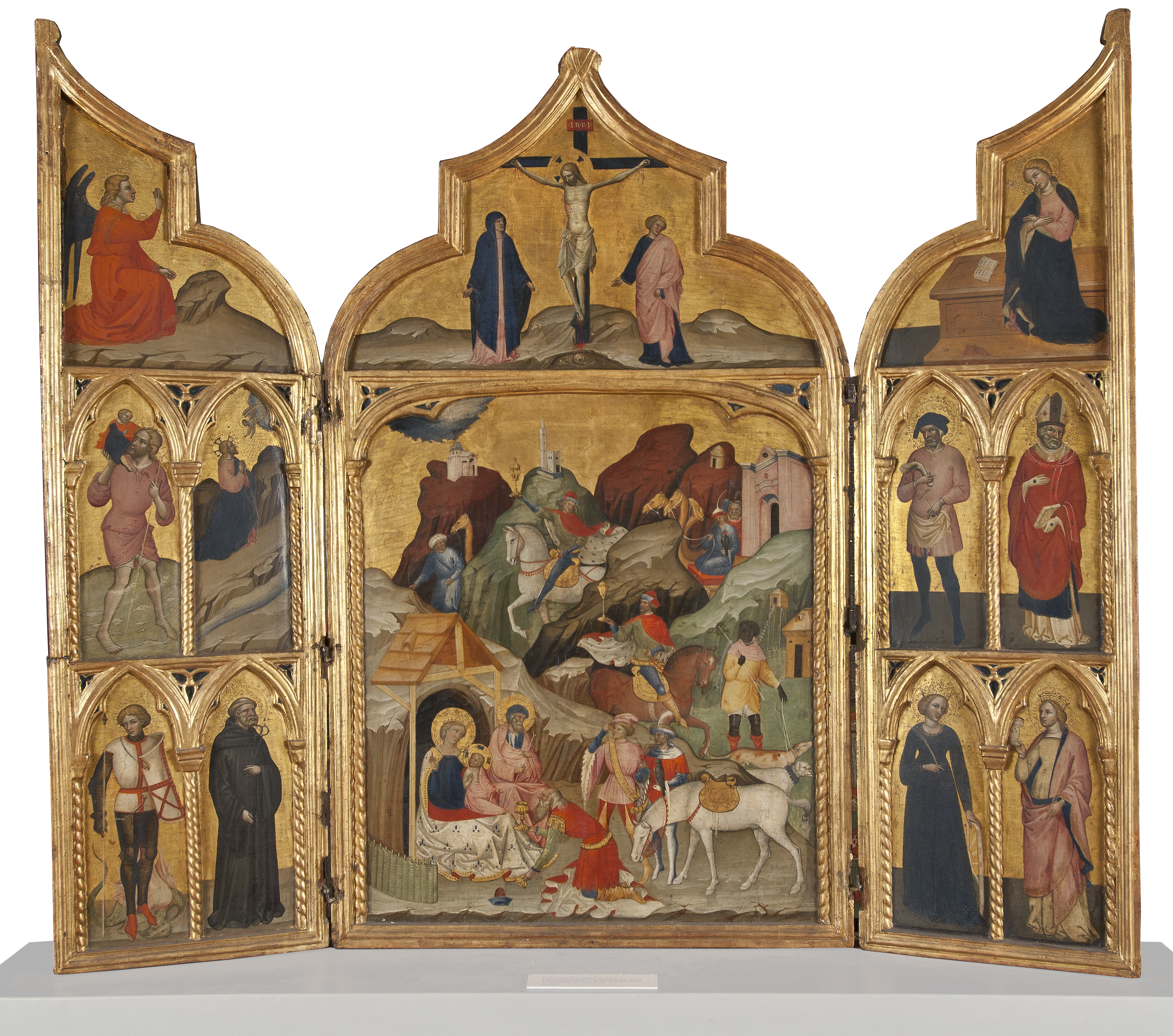
Jacobello del Fiore: The Crucifixion and The Adoration of the Magi, Stockholm, Nationalmuseumn

In 1407 Jacobello painted a triptych of the Virgin of Mercy with Saints James and Anthony Abbot now residing in the church of Santa Maria delle Grazie in Pesaro but originally for the church of Santa Maria in Montegranaro. This triptych, according to Benati, reveals Jacobello's interest in the latest artistic trends: its technique and style are up to date, and the pinched nose of the Virgin points toward the influence of Lombard's Michelino da Besozzo. Similar influences found in Jacobello's triptych of the Adoration of the Magi in Stockholm, Nationalmuseum, place it chronologically near the Virgin of Mercy triptych.

In 1408 Jacobello is believed to have completed another Crucifixion scene with the aid of woodcarver Antonio di Bonvesin for a parish church in Casteldimezzo in Pesaro. The following year he is believed to have painted a tavola for Pesaro, first seen by Lanzi and later hypothetically identified by art critic Keith Christiansen as belonging to the Polyptych of the Blessed Michelina. These two paintings demonstrate his growing professional reputation achieved before the death of his father in 1409–1411.

=== Doge's Palace commission ===
As proof of his prominence, in 1412 the Venetian signory employed Jacobello with an annual salary of one hundred ducats, a stipend that was later reduced to 50 ducats because of Venice's war with Dalmatia.

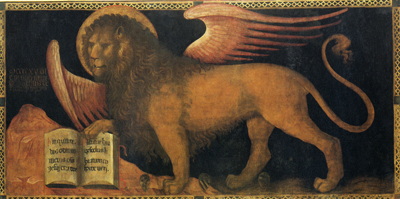
Jacobello del Fiore: The Lion of St. Mark (In situ), 1415 (detail)

Between 1409 and 1415, Jacobello is believed to have been commissioned to decorate the Sala del Maggior Consiglio (Hall of the Great Council) in the Doge's Palace, putting him in direct contact with advanced mainland painters such as Gentile da Fabriano, Pisanello, and Michelino da Besozzo. The influence of Fabriano and Michelino can be seen in Jacobello's previously mentioned 1409 Polyptych of the Blessed Michelina and in the later Virgin of Mercy between Saints John the Baptist and John the Evangelist in the Accademia of Venice, likely painted in the mid-1410s. Michelino's influence can be seen in the heavy-limbed infant and areas of raised pastiglia decoration in the Virgin of Mercy and additionally in the 1415 Lion of St Mark (in situ), specifically in the animal's abstract tail and decorative wings.

Fabriano's influence can be seen in Jacobello's use of luxurious drapery and decorative sophistication; however, instead of adopting Fabriano's empirical attention to detail of nature and surface structure, Jacobello, as noted by Benati, upheld a stylized, abstract use of line and devotion to metallic appearances, giving his work a heraldic appearance. This conscious decision, as Benati further argues, marks a shift in Jacobello's style that loyally turns back to his early influences of the local Trecento tradition of Lorenzo Veneziano.

== Later works and final years ==
=== The Life of St. Lucy, Francesco's Memorial, and final years ===
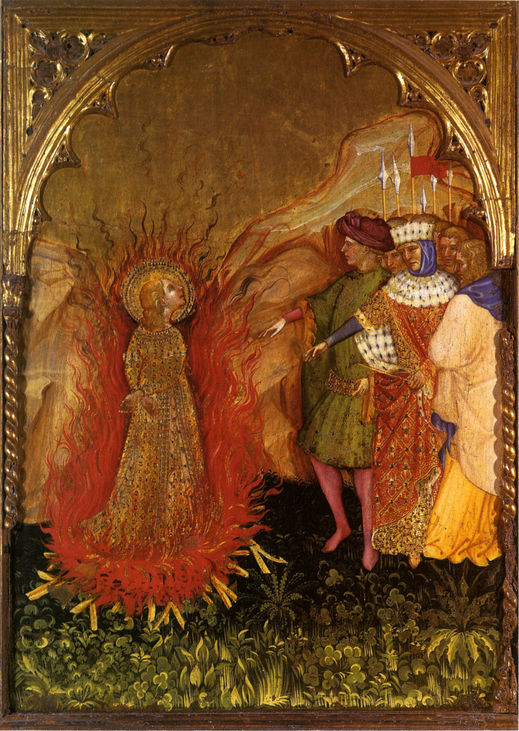
Jacobello del Fiore: Stories from the Life of St. Lucy, Fermo, Pinacoteca Civica

Commissioned for the Adriatic coastal town of Fermo, this altarpiece (Civic Museum, Fermo) is considered his masterpiece. The first record of the work dates to 1763 when it was recorded in the inventory of Saint Lucy's Church in Fermo. The paintings, restored in 1950, highlight the refulgent beauty of the Gothic style that does not attempt to be naturalistic. Instead, Jacobello returns to the narrative style of Paolo Veneziano and his Venetian roots as opposed to moving in the same direction as Gentile and Pisanello.

The eight scenes of the altarpiece depict St. Lucy visiting St. Agatha's tomb, distributing her possessions to the poor, refusing to sacrifice to idols, resisting the pull of oxen to a brothel, burning at the stake, getting stabbed in the throat, receiving Holy Communion before death, and finally, being placed in her grave. Jacobello places the first three scenes amid Gothic-style architecture and the latter five scenes in open spaces with of rocks and grass, which in their detail recall the French tapestries woven in the mille-fleurs style. Additionally, Jacobello captures the extravagance of 15th-century garb in the fifth scene depicting her failed burning at the stake.

In 1433 Jacobello erected a tomb in dedication to his father Francesco in San Giovanni e Paolo (now lost). Jacobello clothed the effigy of his father in a full-length robe to emphasize his social prestige. Benati notes that this stone memorial not only highlights the elevation of artists in that day from simple artisans to revered members of society but also celebrates the vocation of painting, a profession that by 1433 had given Jacobello much wealth and celebrity.

Benati concludes, "It was Jacobello who had to face the challenge of renewing local figurative culture from within, by degrees, and who ultimately succeeded in connecting the thread that tied it to its fourteenth-century principles. In the light of his youthful adherence to the Paduan neo-Giottoesque style, we can better understand how keenly, starting in 1407, he sought to adapt the novelty of the Lombard late Gothic style to local sensibilities."

During the 1430s he is believed to have mentored a young Carlo Crivelli, who was to be later known for his small colorful temperas of landscapes, fruit, flowers, and other accessories. Jacobello's adopted son, Ercole del Fiore, appears in a 1461 record stating his vocation as a painter. Jacobello died in 1439 in his sixties.

== List of works with technical descriptions ==
Name of Work	Year Produced	Medium	Size	Current location
Madonna and Child	Unknown	Tempera on panel	88 x 62 cm	Private collection
Crucifixion	1400	Tempera and gold on panel	127 x 135 cm	Toledo Museum of Art, Toledo, Ohio
Virgin and Child	1410	Panel	57 x 39 cm	Museo Correr, Venice
Triptych of the Madonna della Misericordia	1415	Tempera on panel	86 x 113 cm	Gallerie dell'Accademia, Venice
Justice between the Archangels Michael and Gabriel	1421	Tempera on panel	208 x 490 cm	Gallerie dell'Accademia, Venice
Coronation of the Virgin	1438	Tempera on panel	283 x 303 cm	Gallerie dell'Accademia, Venice

=== Madonna and Child ===
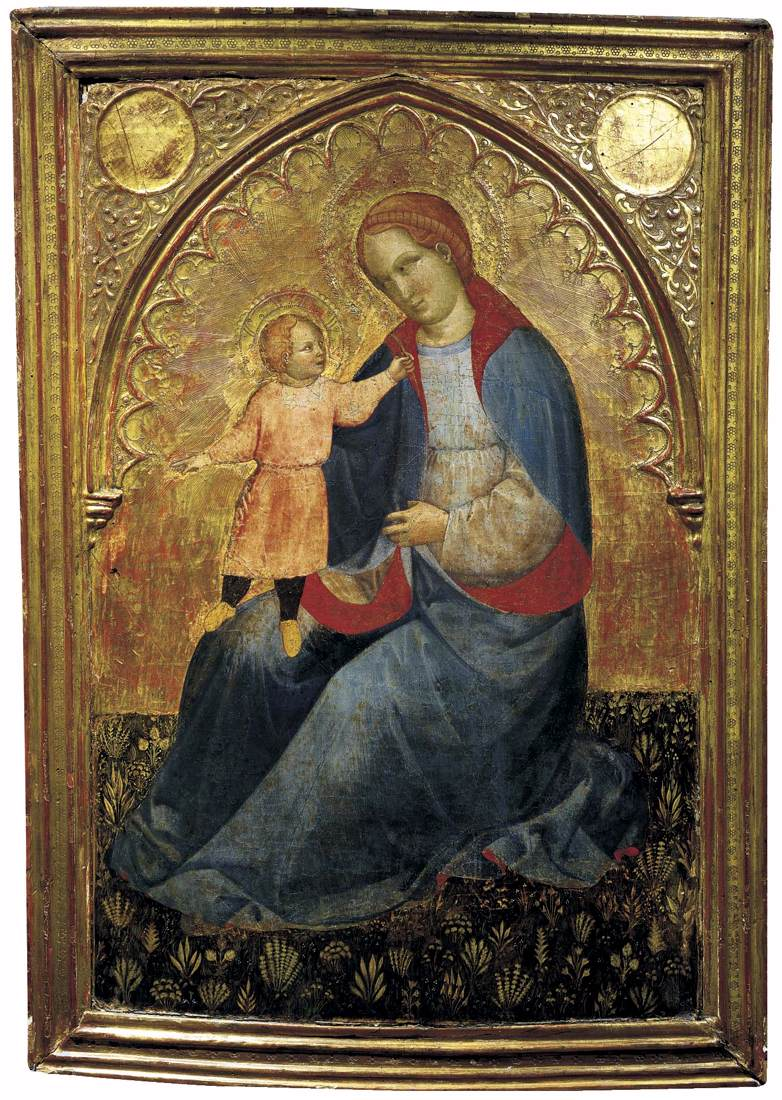
Jacobello del Fiore: Madonna and Child

Madonna and Child is a painting that aligns with its contemporaries and is comparable to them. For example, the way that it portrays the child is expectedly crude: the child looks like an adult person that has been scaled down and shrunk in proportion to Mary. This is due in part to the fact that Renaissance depictions of children were less sophisticated than the depictions of adults.

Yet, art historians have noted that the overall mood of the Virgin Mary and baby Jesus is unexpectedly tender and loving when compared to the Byzantine works that this piece is otherwise evoking. Mary's posture is less rigid than it is in most depictions: she is turned slightly towards Jesus and is looking at him, two features rarely found in the works Jacobello would have looked to as inspiration. As for baby Jesus himself, his posture is casual and he extends a hand out to his mother, also a contrast to the precedent set by other paintings. These stylistic choices distinguish Jacobello's work from that of his contemporaries as well as from that of earlier Byzantine models.

The panel upon which this painting was created is adorned with specialized, intricate, and ornamental carving in lieu of a painted background. A plain layer of gold fills up most of the space around the Virgin Mary and Jesus. Jacobello opts to use solid color and to form patterns and visual interest through carving rather than a painted landscape as the background, though greenery and foliage are still present in the painting. The halos are rendered by light carvings around the figures’ heads.

As with many of Jacobello's works, the shading on the subjects of this painting doesn't appear to come from a realistic or singular light source. This was common among paintings from this time period, as realistic lighting and shading in painting by means of considering a light source had not yet been widely popularized. Just as the depiction of clothing and fabric is advanced, the portrayal of foliage and plants as scenery is flat and two dimensional considering this painting's Byzantine influences. The Virgin Mary's legs are made disproportionately long.

=== Crucifixion (Ohio) ===
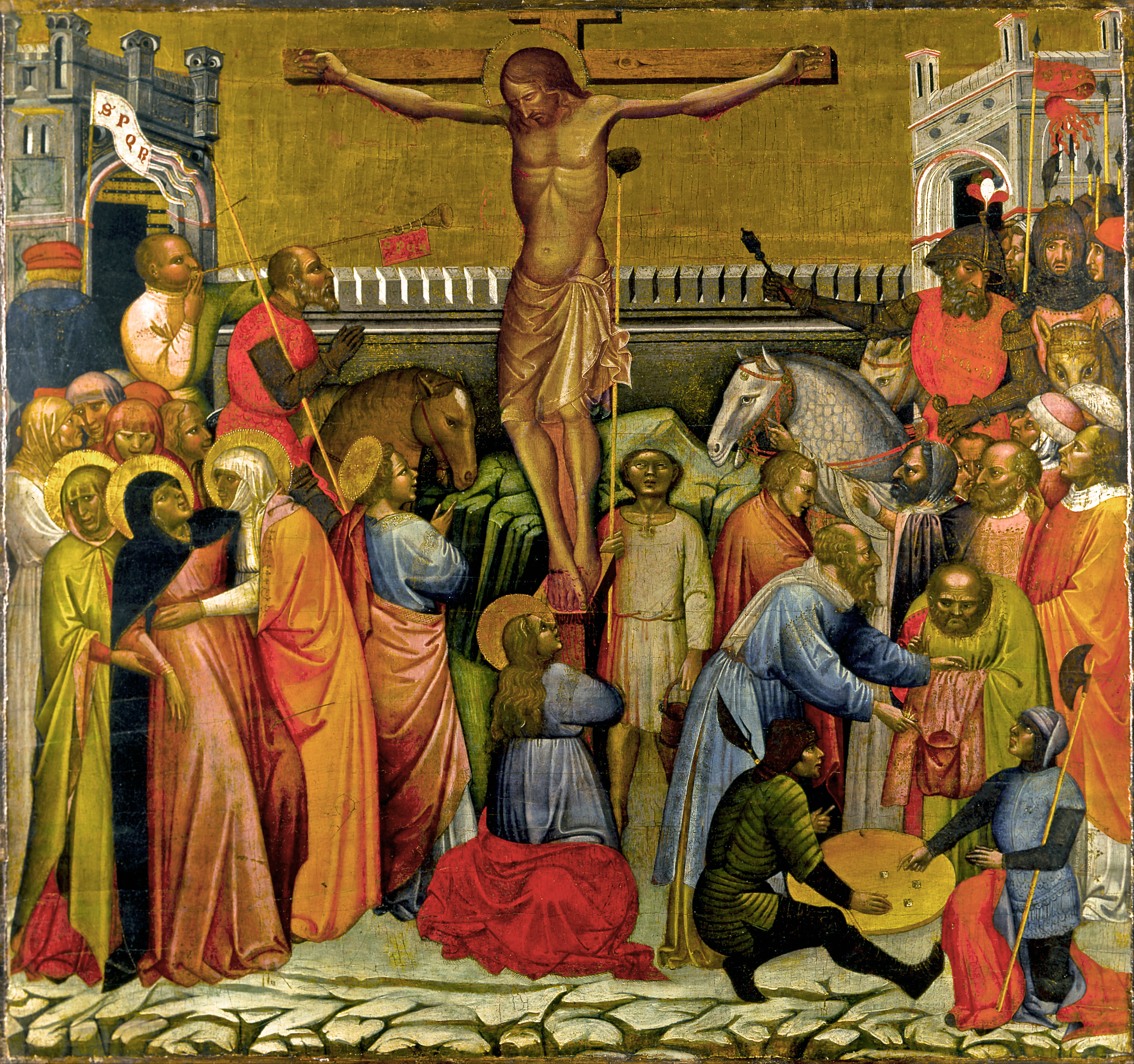
Jacobello del Fiore: Crucifixion, 1395–1400, now in Toledo, Ohio

Art historians presume that the small Crucifixion panel in Ohio was a single part of a larger whole work or altarpiece. Christ is presented on the same plane as all of the other figures in the painting, yet he appears to be much larger than any other person in the frame. Christ's proportional domination of the composition exemplifies a common Renaissance technique used to place emphasis on a subject. Most of the bright color from this piece comes from clothing, ranging from red to blue and orange tones. The color of the clothing is especially accentuated by the skin tones of the figures, which have become muted and faded over time.

While the plethora of people that surround Jesus may look like a randomly distributed crowd, they are actually placed in a sort of continuum or timeline, and include significant people such as Saint John and Mary Magdalene. The figures have sequential and chronological significance when viewed from left to right, as they tell the story leading up to the crucifixion depicted in the painting. The composition displays a rudimentary use of perspective: While there does not appear to be one set or standard vanishing point or horizon line, the wood of the cross and the stone of the wall behind Christ appear to have depth. The rocks present in the foreground of the piece are developed in a realistic manner with regard to shading.

The Crucifixion shows Jacobello's level of proficiency with regards to human anatomy, and his attempts to pose figures in more natural or realistic positions than they had been in the past. This piece, one of his most famous, is used by art historians to demonstrate Jacobello's progression, and first attempts separate himself from the Italo-Byzantine art styles that preceded him.

=== Virgin and Child ===
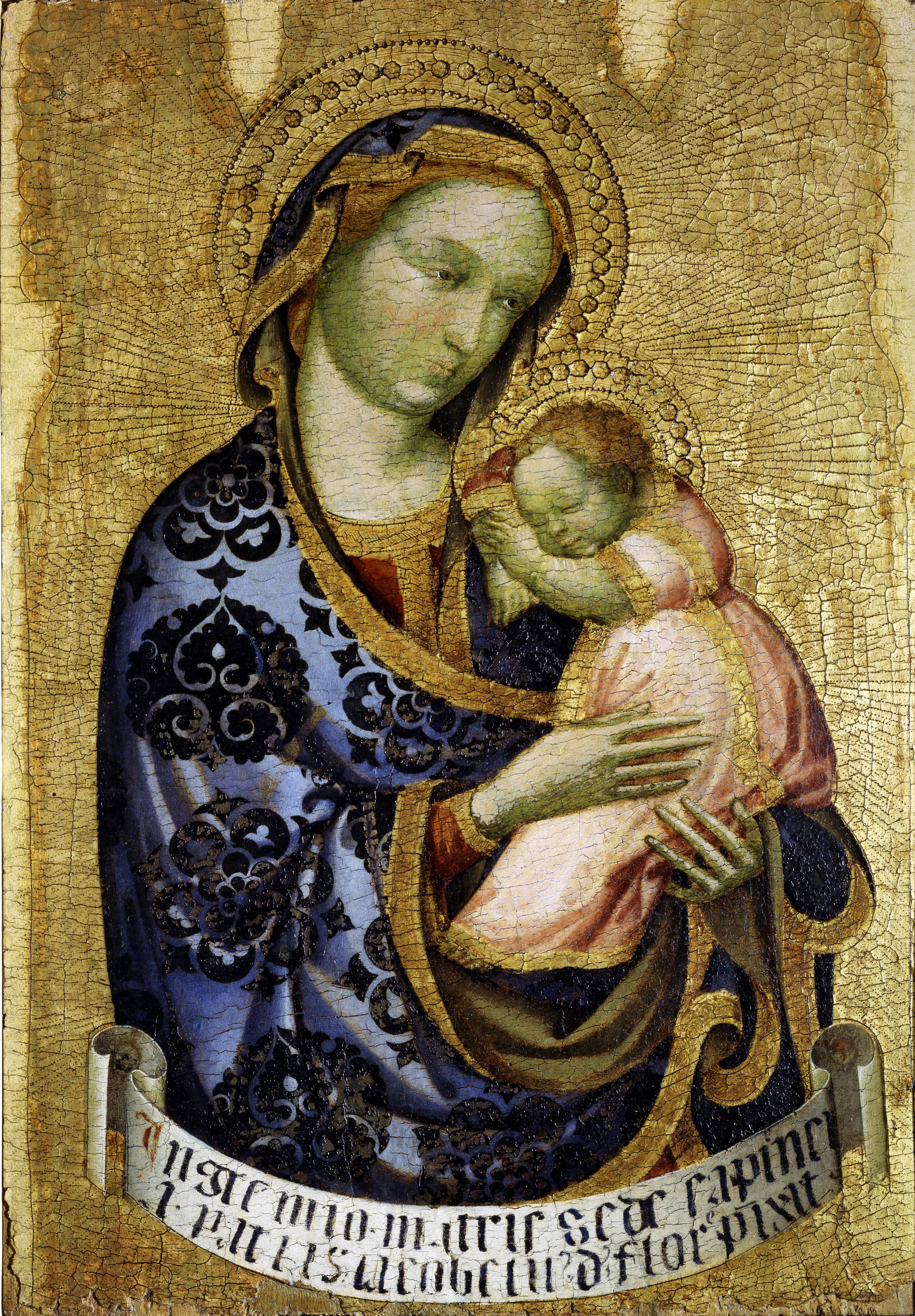
Jacobello del Fiore: Virgin and Child, 1410

Virgin and Child is considered by art historians to be one of Jacobello's most important and defining works. It utilizes what may be the most realistic proportions for human beings in Jacobello's entire body of work, even though it was produced during a phase when his artworks were inspired with Byzantine sensibilities of early fourteenth-century Venetian artists. The depiction of baby Jesus in this work is uncharacteristically realistic and accurately proportioned to how a small infant would look and be posed against its mother.

Though the current condition of Virgin and Child is poor, the colors have been preserved fairly well, and retain vibrancy. In its original state, it is presumed that Virgin and Child was one of Jacobello's brightest works, especially when compared to the darker color schemes of his later, more Gothic-inspired pieces like Justice between the Archangels Michael and Gabriel and Coronation of the Virgin. The brightness from this piece comes mainly from the clothing worn by the Virgin Mary and baby Jesus. Mary sports a large bold pattern on one of her fabrics, a feature unique to this painting among Jacobello's repertoire. Virgin and Child has a solid golden background, though it does not have any complex ornamental framing, carving, or patterning like some of his other works. The halos are created through texturing on the panel.

This work is important in Jacobello's career in the eyes of art historians because it illustrates his progression through time, and also showcases how he was influential, as the works of other artists like Antonio Vivarini and Giambono emulate this artwork.

=== Triptych of the Madonna della Misericordia ===
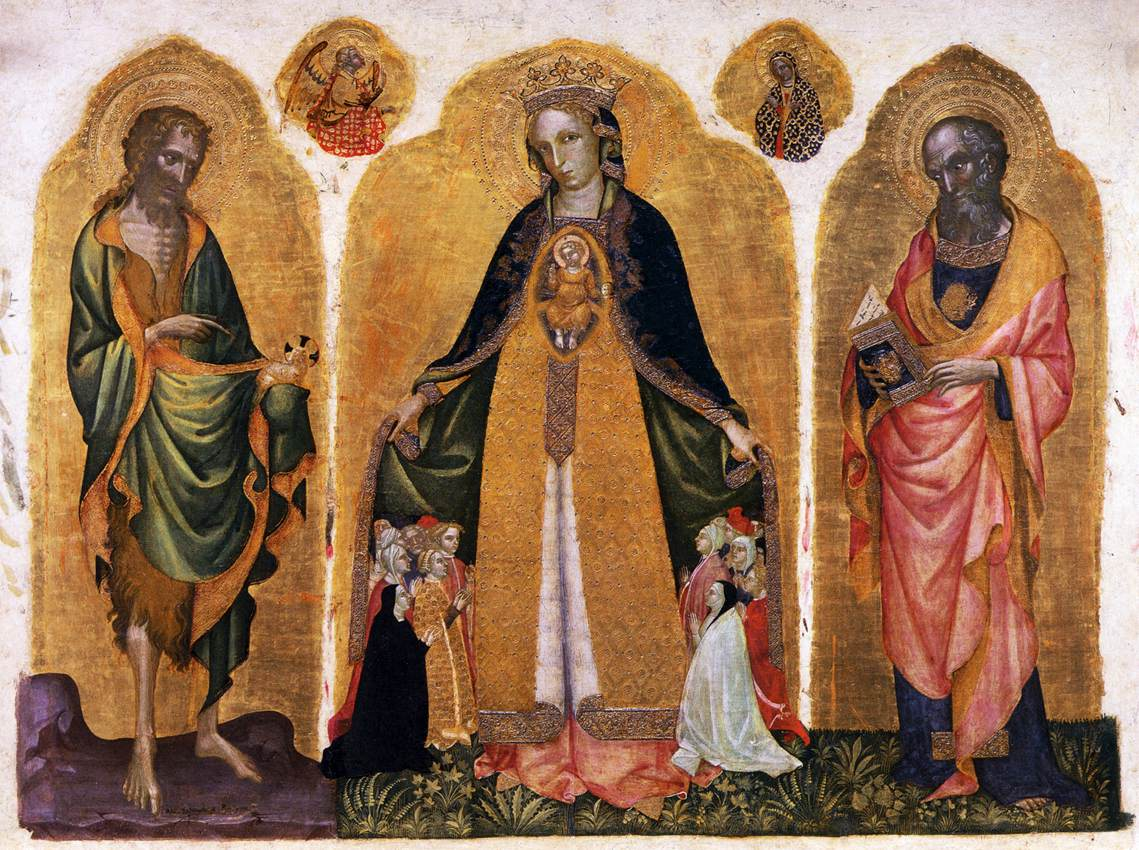
Jacobello del Fiore: Triptych of the Madonna della Misericordia, 1415

Triptych of the Madonna della Misericordia depicts the Virgin Mary in a central position, flanked on one side by Saint John the Baptist and on the other side by Saint John the Evangelist. The Virgin Mary has crowds of people intimately surrounding her. The figures occupy a shallow depth, and the plain solid golden background has little ornamental decoration in the form of carving or pattern.

This piece represents the beginning of Jacobello's return to the style that he originally had an affinity for: that of Byzantine-inspired, early-fourteenth-century Venetian painting. The color palette of this work and the manner in which the figures are shaded are more similar to some of Jacobello's earlier works such as Crucifixion than his later, more Gothic-inspired artworks like Justice between the Archangels Michael and Gabriel. Though art historians consider this movement a reversion to an older style on Jacobello's part, they do not consider it a regression in terms of technical aptitude.

Elements of this piece that affirm these art historians’ assertions are the depiction of cloth, hair and skin, compared to Jacobello's earlier works. The lighting and shading on those clothes and fabrics is consistent, the fabrics are more detailed than in Jacobello's other pieces, and subtle textures distinguish a velvety fabric from a more silky fabric. Additional effects are used such as frayed tattering on the figure on the left, and intricate details on the trim of some of the garments.

The rocky surface on the leftmost side of the image is rendered skillfully, and a measurable improvement can be seen in the depiction of vegetation in this painting compared to Madonna and Child. Since it is unknown when Madonna and Child was painted, art historians can use Triptych of the Madonna della Misericordia as a reference to determine that Madonna and Child was completed before this painting. The foliage in Triptych of the Madonna della Misericordia is accurately colored, realistically shaded, and appropriately layered. Hair is curly and stylized, and skin is depicted in a similar way to its representation in Jacobello's earlier works of this same style, except here there are more realistic wrinkles.

The composition of this piece favors a more Byzantine-inspired sensibility because of the way that the different depictions of figures are bordered and sectioned off. The proportional difference between representations of humans is more drastic than in Jacobello's other works. The common people surrounding the Virgin Mary are so small that the Madonna shelters them underneath her clothing. The figures are more stylized in their bodily proportions than usual for Jacobello. Their exaggerated slenderness can be observed most notably in the exposed lower legs of the saint on the left. Halos are less ethereal than they are in Jacobello's other works.

=== Justice between the Archangels Michael and Gabriel ===
Painted for the Magistrato del Proprio in the Doge's Palace in 1421 (now in the Gallerie dell'Accademia, Venice), and also referred to simply as The Triptych of Justice, Justice between the Archangels Michael and Gabriel established a distinct style that dictated Venetian painting for more than a decade. The center figure represents both justice and Venice, with a scale in one hand and a sword of punishment in the other. The scroll behind her head reads, "I will carry out the admonition of the angels and the holy word: gentle with the pious, harsh with the evil, and haughty with the proud." On the left panel St. Michael battles a dragon and holds a scroll that asks Venice/Justice to "commend the purged souls to the scales of benignity." On the right panel Angel Gabriel declares himself as messenger to Mary and asks Venice to guide men through the darkness. As a both civil and criminal court, this commission celebrates both functions of the Magistrato del Proprio. Giambono's St Michael and Michele di Matteo's altarpiece of the Virgin with Saints both pay homage to this triptych, testaments to its influence.

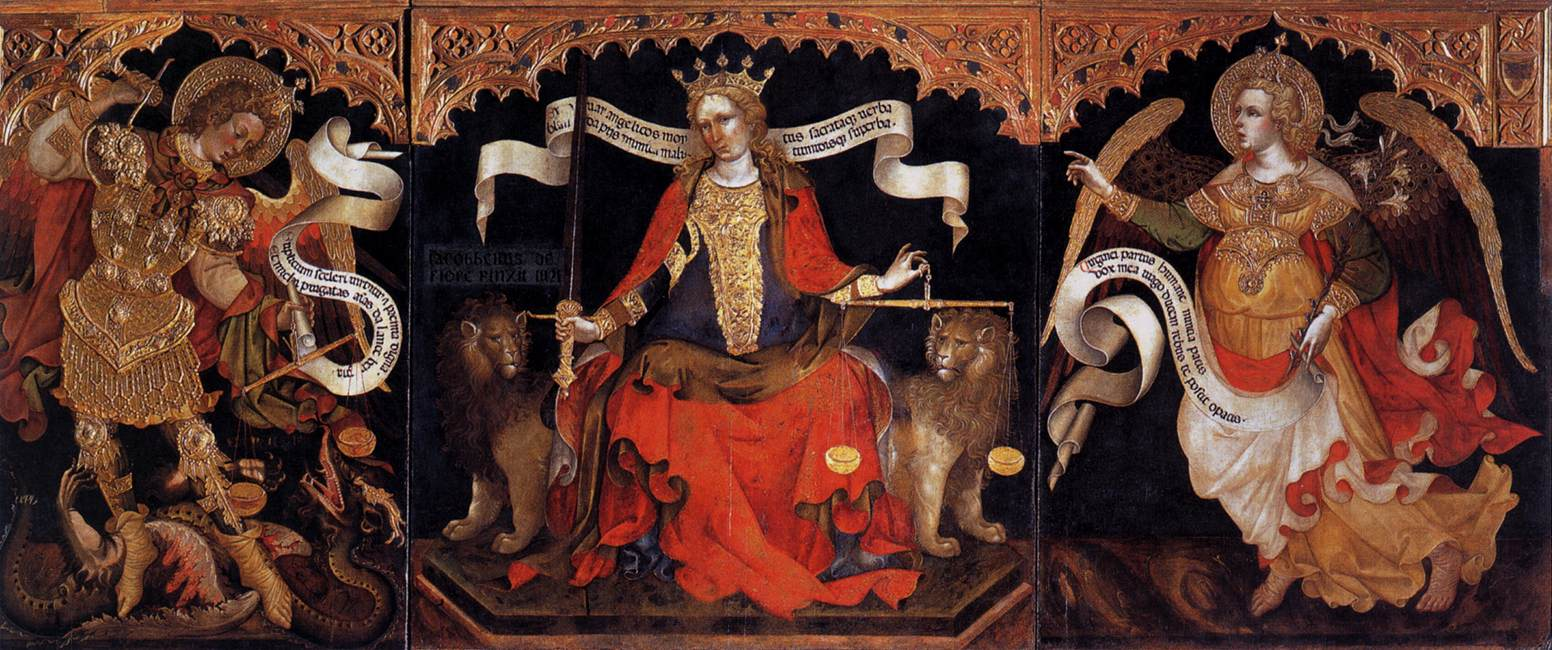
Jacobello del Fiore: Justice Between the Archangels Michael and Gabriel, 1421

Justice between the Archangels Michael and Gabriel is one of Jacobello's most famous works. It is one of his longest paintings, more than 400 centimeters in width, and marks the peak of his stylistic shift to a more gothic sensibility. This can be noted in the composition, in the posing and display of the figures, and in other subtle details.

The stylistic shift that Jacobello underwent can be attributed, in the opinion of many art historians, to Gentile de Fabriano, who was commissioned by the Venetian Republic to paint the Great Council Chamber of the Palace of the Doges, who were religious leaders in Venice. When Gentile took this job, he painted with courtly gothic inspiration. This style influenced many artists living in Venice at the time who, up until then, had been practicing a more Byzantine-inspired, early-fourteenth-century Venetian painting style.

Justice between the Archangels Michael and Gabriel differs from some of Jacobello's earlier works is its texturing. While the use of texturing to define border and background had been seen in some of his previous works such as Madonna and Child, here texturing describes the armor and decorative elements of both archangels, some of the clothing of the women representing Justice, her sword hilt, her crown, and her scales. The depiction of animals is also rare for Jacobello, yet seen here with the two Venetian lions that flank lady Justice. The halos of the two archangels are more intricately detailed and complex than the halos of figures in Jacobello's other pieces. There is improvement in the depiction of cloth and fabric, human skin, hair, and consistent shading. The level of detail in this piece is one reason that art historians consider it to be the height of Jacobello's gothic phase, important not just as a landmark in Jacobello's career, but as a progression of his technical skills and proficiency. It was the knowledge that Jacobello gained and the mastery of technical skill that he achieved through this piece that allowed his later confident retardataire return to his roots when his works leaned back more towards a Byzantine-inspired style.

This painting is also considered to be more metaphorical and symbolic than Jacobello's others, even those highly steeped with symbolism, like Coronation of the Virgin and Crucifixion, because Justice between the Archangels Michael and Gabriel, as the title implies, contains a physical manifestation of the concept of justice. This piece is divided into three sections in a way that historians suspect that Crucifixion was intended to be divided, Crucifixion itself being the middle piece.

=== Coronation of the Virgin ===
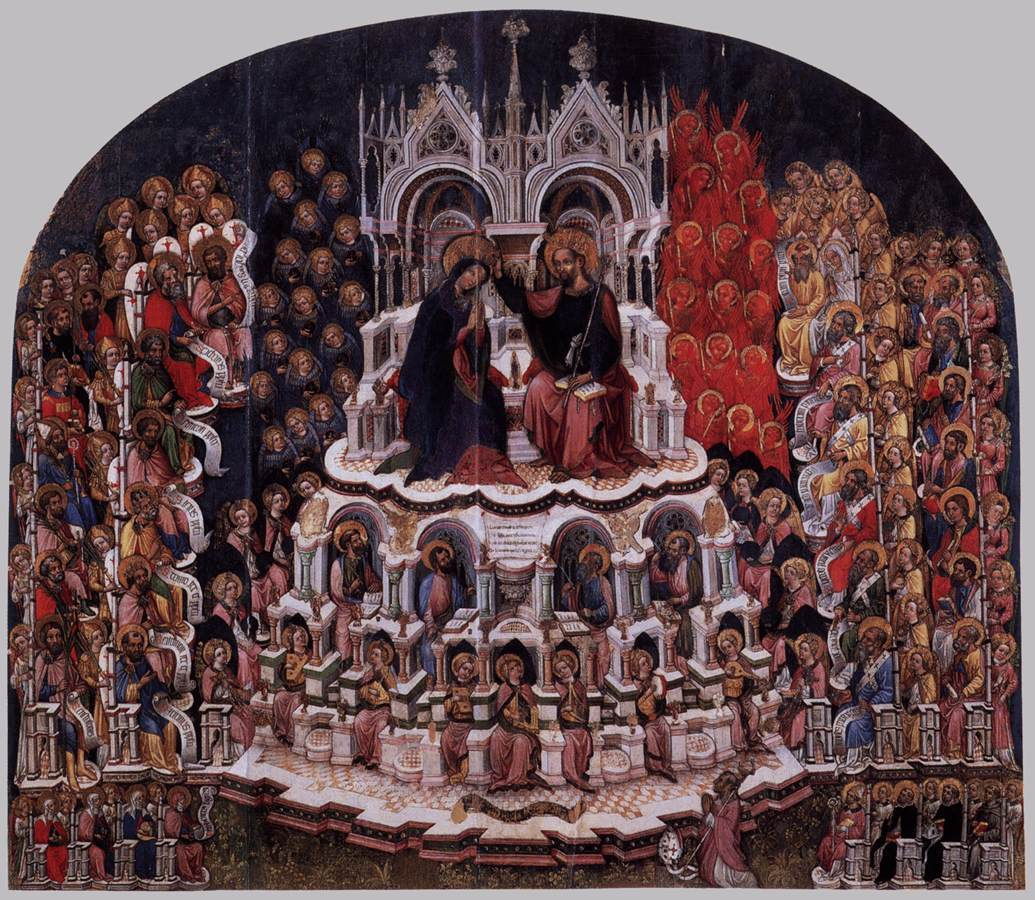
Jacobello del Fiore: Coronation of the Virgin, 1438

One of Jacobello's largest discovered works, this painting measures almost 300 centimeters in both width and height, and depicts the Virgin Mary's acceptance into heaven, which is metaphorically represented as her son, Jesus, crowning her in front of a grand audience. The border of this painting is standard and rectangular at the bottom with two corners and rounded at the top, in an oblong manner. At the center are Jesus and Mary, seated on elaborate thrones.

Filling the surrounding architecture is a multitude of religiously significant people, serving as a sort of ceremonial audience to the crowning of Mary. These figures are all a part of the canon of the Christian Bible and the Catholic Church as people who have passed on, and are proverbially "cheering the Virgin Mary on" into heaven. Figures are seated to the left of Jesus and Mary, to the right of them, and even below them, both within the columns of the structure upon which Jesus and Mary are seated, and a layer below that, among greenery and foliage beneath the base of the architectural structure. The clothing of these figures distinguishes different types of people such as apostles, martyrs, saints, virgins, and angels, through the color of the fabric. The coloring of this painting is dark, though it is hard to know how the current state of the painting compares to the original in terms of color.

Jesus's and Mary's halos are depicted as opaque golden circles behind their heads. Though the mood in this piece is portrayed as reverent and ceremonial, celebratory aspects are also present, ranging from an angelic choir, to musical instruments, and foliage alluding to the Garden of Eden. Jesus and Mary are depicted as significantly larger than the other figures, to emphasize their importance.

=== Legacy ===
For many years after his death, Jacobello del Fiore was not given the due that field experts find appropriate today as one of the leading Venetian artists of his era. Keith Christiansen writes in his book on Gentile da Fabriano, “Jacobello del Fiore suffers from a greater critical misunderstanding than any other early Venetian artist. R. Longhi judged him a lesser personality than Niccolò di Pietro or Zanino because his works seemed deeply linked to Venetian painting rather than that of the mainland. In fact, Jacobello was the greatest local artist of his generation." Art historians such as Daniele Benati have clarified Jacobello's role as the link between emerging Late Gothic style of the Lombardy artists and the local Trecento tradition of Venetian painters, restoring his important role in Venetian art and the changing styles of the time. Benati concludes, "It was Jacobello who had to face the challenge of renewing local figurative culture from within, by degrees, and who ultimately succeeded in connecting the thread that tied it to its fourteenth-century principles. In the light of his youthful adherence to the Paduan neo-Giottoesque style, we can better understand how keenly, starting in 1407, he sought to adapt the novelty of the Lombard late Gothic style to local sensibilities."

There is no known portrait of Jacobello in existence. Despite his influence and prominence in the early fifteenth century Renaissance Venetian arena of painting, Jacobello del Fiore is not remembered as a major figure of the Renaissance. Jacobello del Fiore's paintings are integral primary sources for art historians and casual researchers alike to understand this artist.
