= Cortemaggiore gas field =

Natural gas field in Emilia-Romagna, Italy

Cortemaggiore
- Country: Italy
- Region: Emilia-Romagna
- Offshore/onshore: onshore
- Operator: Eni

Field history
- Discovery: 2000
- Start of production: 2000

Production
- Current production of gas: 3×10^{6} m^{3}/d 105×10^{6} cu ft/d 1×10^{9} m^{3}/a (35×10^{9} cu ft/a)
- Estimated oil in place: 8 million barrels (~1.1×10^{6} t)
- Estimated gas in place: 14.2×10^{9} m^{3} 495×10^{9} cu ft

The Cortemaggiore gas field is a natural gas field located in Cortemaggiore, Province of Piacenza, Emilia-Romagna, Italy, situated in the Po Valley approximately 80 kilometres (50 mi) from Milan. The field is operated by Eni and produces both natural gas and condensates.

== History ==
The Cortemaggiore area has a long history of hydrocarbon exploration. The original field was discovered by AGIP in 1949, following earlier discoveries at Caviaga in 1944 and Ripalta Cremasca in 1948. The discovery of extensive methane reserves in the Po Valley near Cortemaggiore overturned the widely held assumption that Italy possessed no meaningful hydrocarbons of its own, and provided the justification for preserving AGIP rather than liquidating it as the postwar government had planned.

By 1952, the field was being developed.

In 1954, the field supplied 123,800 tonnes of crude oil, making it the most significant oil find in Italian history at the time. The discovery directly contributed to the founding of ENI on 10 February 1953, which consolidated AGIP and other state energy interests under a single national hydrocarbons company. AGIP used the commercial success of the Po Valley gas fields to introduce its Supercortemaggiore high-octane petrol brand, which became synonymous with Italian postwar industrial recovery.

A modern gas field bearing the same name was discovered in 2000 and developed by Eni. The field is onshore, with estimated gas in place of 14.2 billion m³ (495 billion ft³) and estimated oil in place of 8 million barrels. Production began the same year, at a rate of approximately 3 million m³/day (105 million ft³/day), with annual output of around 1 billion m³ (35 billion ft³).

== Production ==
Operator	Eni
Location	Onshore, Province of Piacenza, Emilia-Romagna
Discovery	2000
Start of production	2000
Gas in place	14.2 × 10⁹ m³ (495 × 10⁹ ft³)
Oil in place	8 million barrels (~1.1 × 10⁶ t)
Production rate (gas)	3 × 10⁶ m³/day (105 × 10⁶ ft³/day)
Annual production	~1 × 10⁹ m³ (35 × 10⁹ ft³)

== See also ==
- Energy law#European Union
