= Basilica of Santa Maria delle Grazie, Cortemaggiore =

Church building in Cortemaggiore, Italy

Coordinates: 44°59′46.1″N 9°55′54.7″E

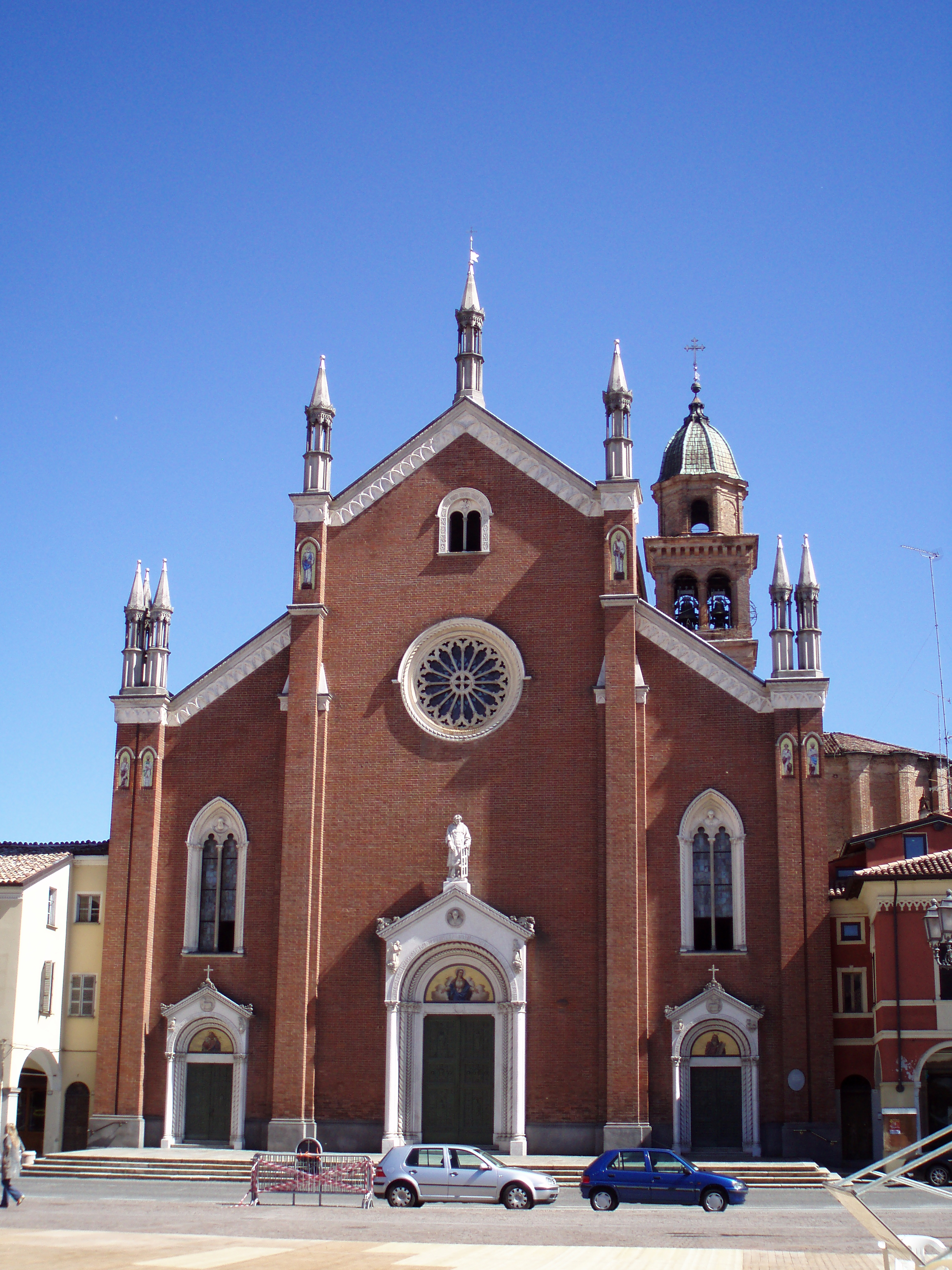
Facade

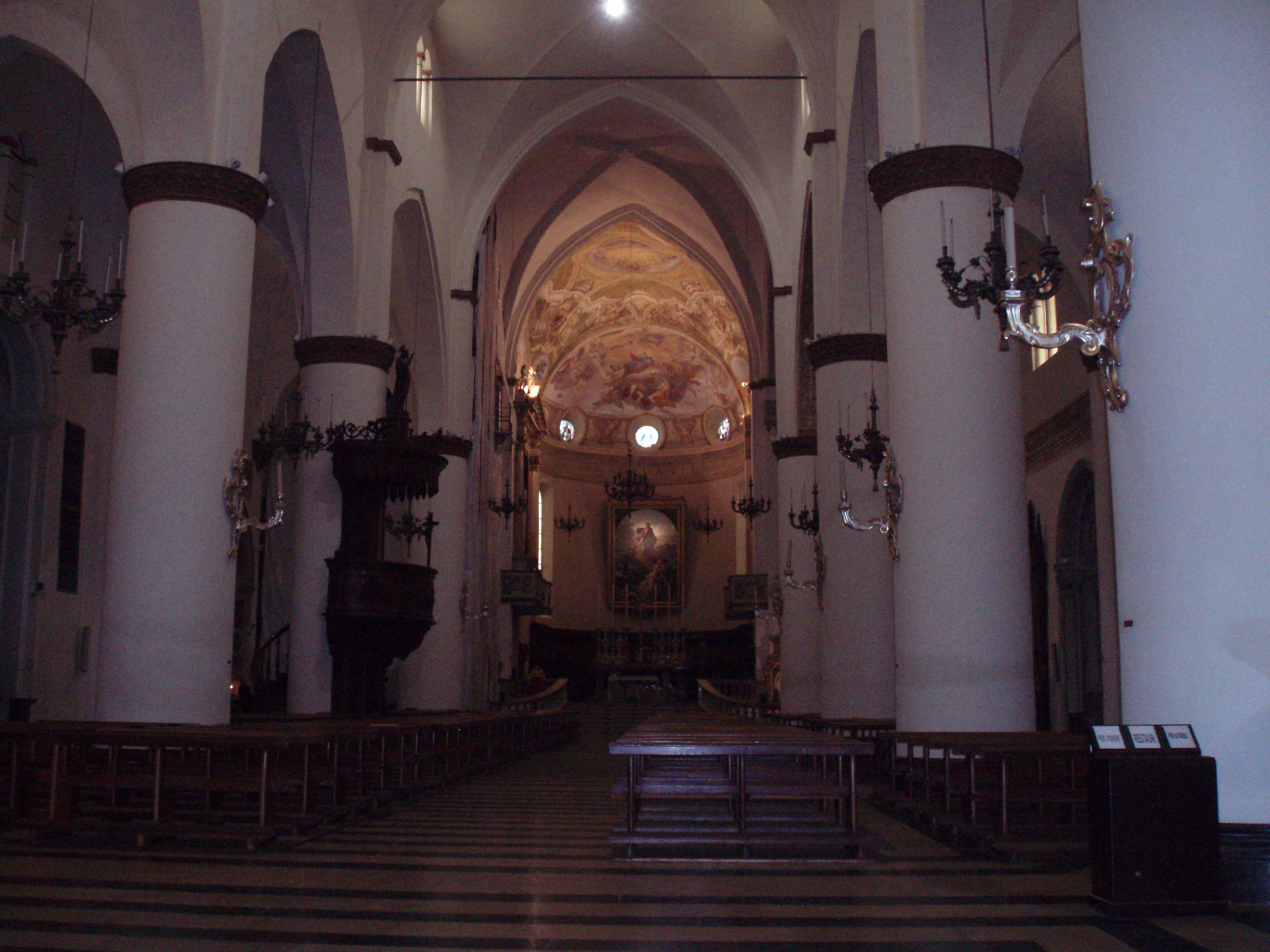
Interior

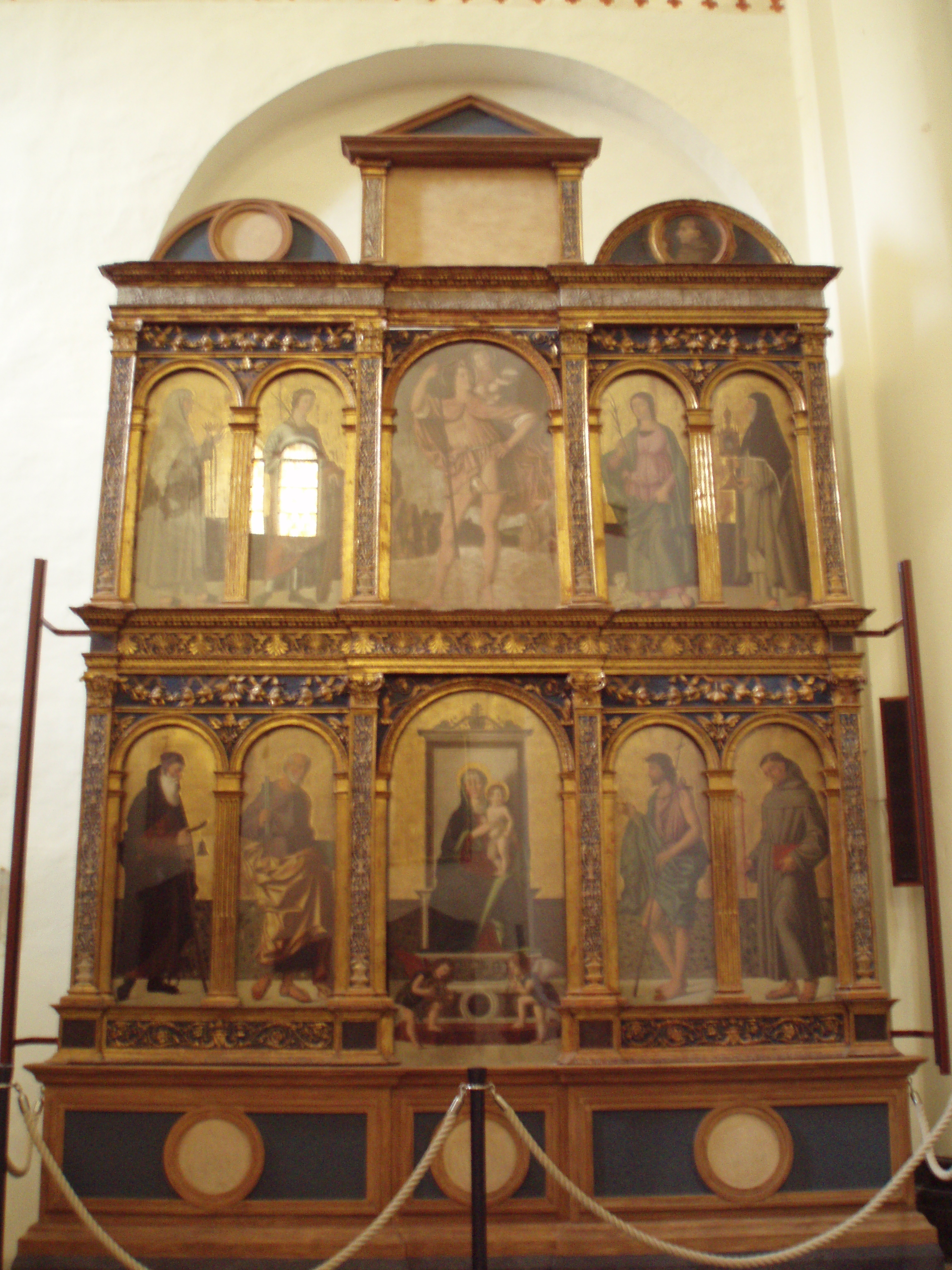
Mazzola's polyptych

The Basilica of Santa Maria delle Grazie or Collegiata is a Gothic style, Roman Catholic church and cathedral of Cortemaggiore, in the Province of Piacenza, region of Emilia-Romagna, Italy.

The church was built in 1480 using designs by Gilberto Manzi for a Latin cross layout. The belltower (1881) was added by Gaetano Guglielmetti. The interior conserves a valued polyptych, composed by twelve pieces, by Filippo Mazzola, the father of Parmigianino. The left aisle has the sculpturally elegant mausoleum (1499) of the Pallavicini family, including Gianludovico and his wife. The works are attributed to the school of Amedeo. The chapel of the Rosary contains a canvas of Madonna, Child and st Louis Gonzaga by Pompeo Batoni, and a restored Pieta by Il Pordenone. In the crypt is a fresco depicting Christ emerging from the Tomb (1522) attributed to Antonietto de' Renzi.
