= Santa Maria delle Grazie di Montevergine =

Theatre in Palermo, Italy

Coordinates: 38°06′54.8″N 13°21′30.4″E

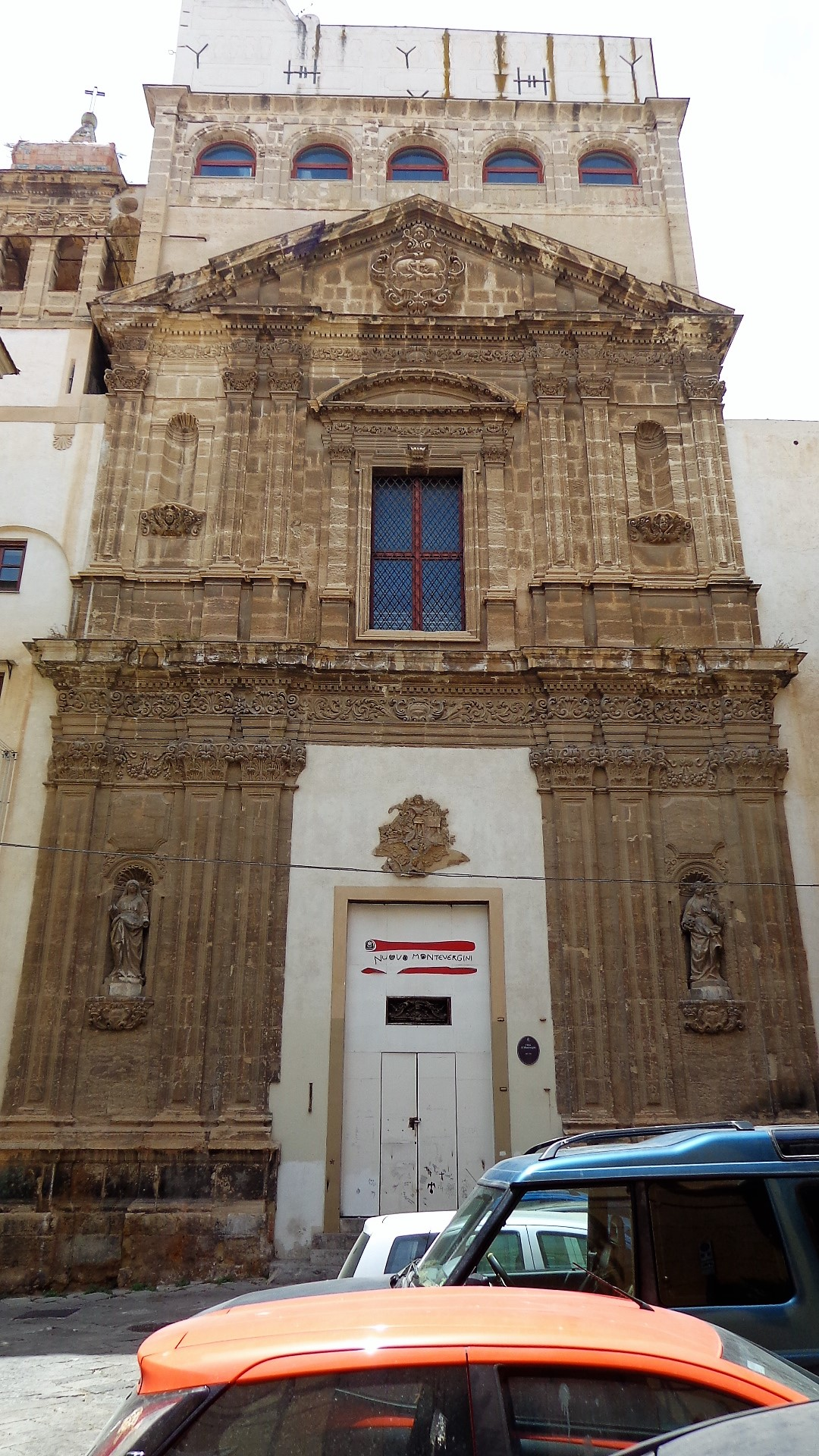
Facade of Church with bell-tower on left

Santa Maria delle Grazie di Montevergine (Holy Mary of the Graces) is a Baroque deconsecrated church in Palermo, region of Sicily, Italy. It is located on piazetta Montervergini. The church now functions as a theater: Teatro Nuovo Montevergini.

The present edifice was constructed in 1698 to replace a smaller church from the 15th century. It was property of the adjacent former cloistered female Clarissan convent; the site of that former monastery is now the Institute "Filippo Parlatore" designed in the 19th century by Lorenzo Ciprì. The facade of the church was designed by A. Palma (1644-1730). The facade has two statues depicting Saints Clare and Rosalia. In the tympanum above the portal is the heraldic symbols of the Franciscan order, with two crossed arms before a Christian cross. The bell-tower was designed by G.Mariani (1681-1731), but completed by the engineer Del Frago. The single nave was frescoed by Guglielmo Borremans with a depiction of the Glory of the Franciscan Order (1721). Surrounding frescoes by Giuseppe Velasco depict the Lifes of Franciscan Saints. The suppression of the religious order in 1866 led to the suppression of the monastery ad removal of many of the interior artworks, including an Annunciation altarpiece by Pietro Novelli, now on display in the Museo Diocesano di Palermo.
