= Filippo Mazzola =

Italian painter (1460–1505)

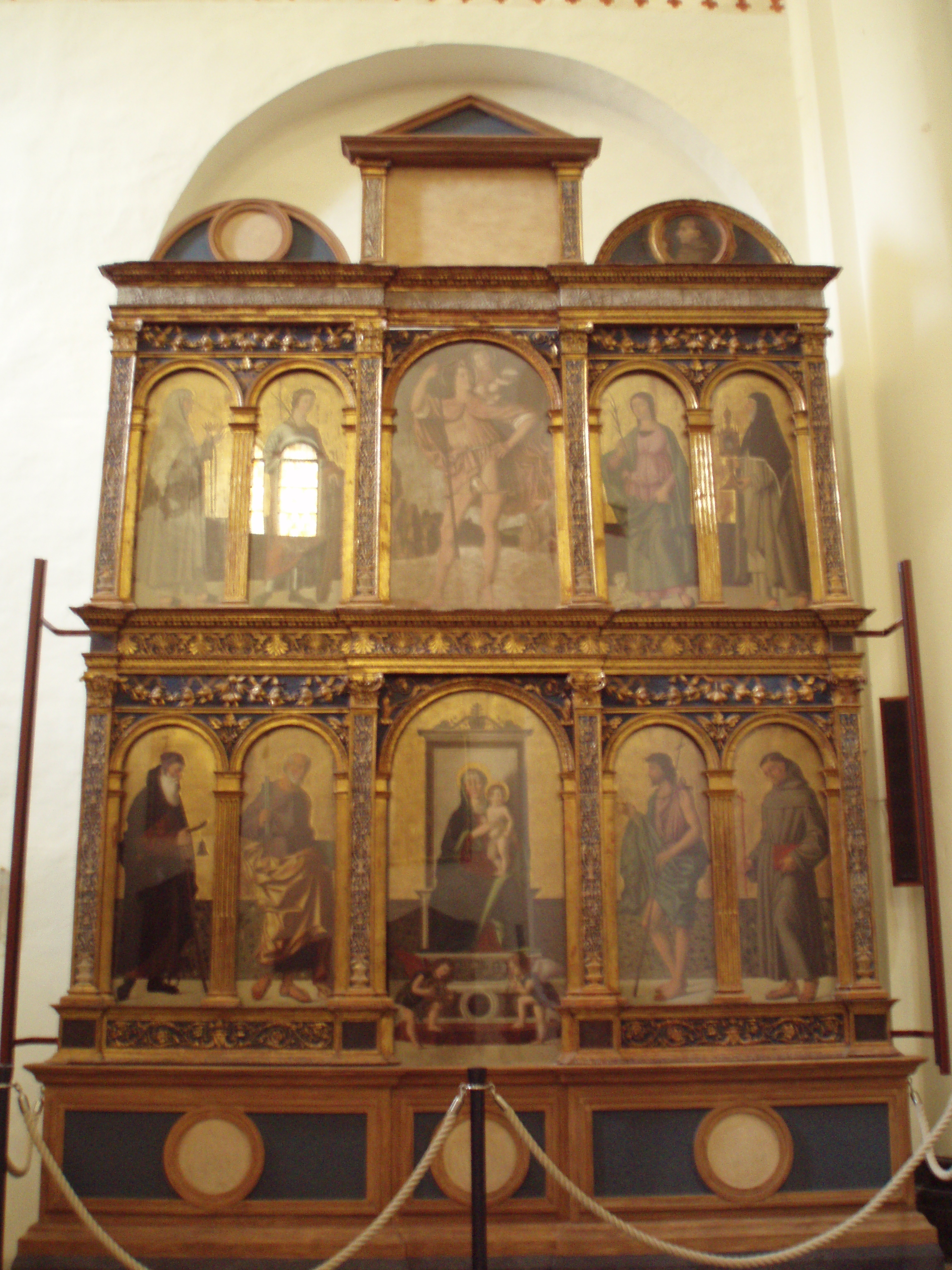
polyptych by Filippo Mazzola, basilica of Cortemaggiore

Filippo Mazzola (1460 - 1505) was an Italian painter of the Renaissance period.

He was born in Parma, his father was Bartholomew, and he became a pupil of Francesco Tacconi. He worked mainly in the area between Parma and Piacenza. There is documentation of a trip to Venice, where he is thought to have gone to study his main stylistic references: Antonello da Messina, Giovanni Bellini and Alvise Vivarini. His most notable work is the polyptych kept at the basilica of Cortemaggiore, although it is currently missing a couple of paintings. He was the father of the painter Girolamo Francesco Maria Mazzola. He died at the age of about 45 years, during an epidemic of plague.
