= Santa Maria delle Grazie, Alcamo =

Roman Catholic church in Alcamo, Italy

Santa Maria delle Grazie
- Chiesa di Santa Maria delle Grazie
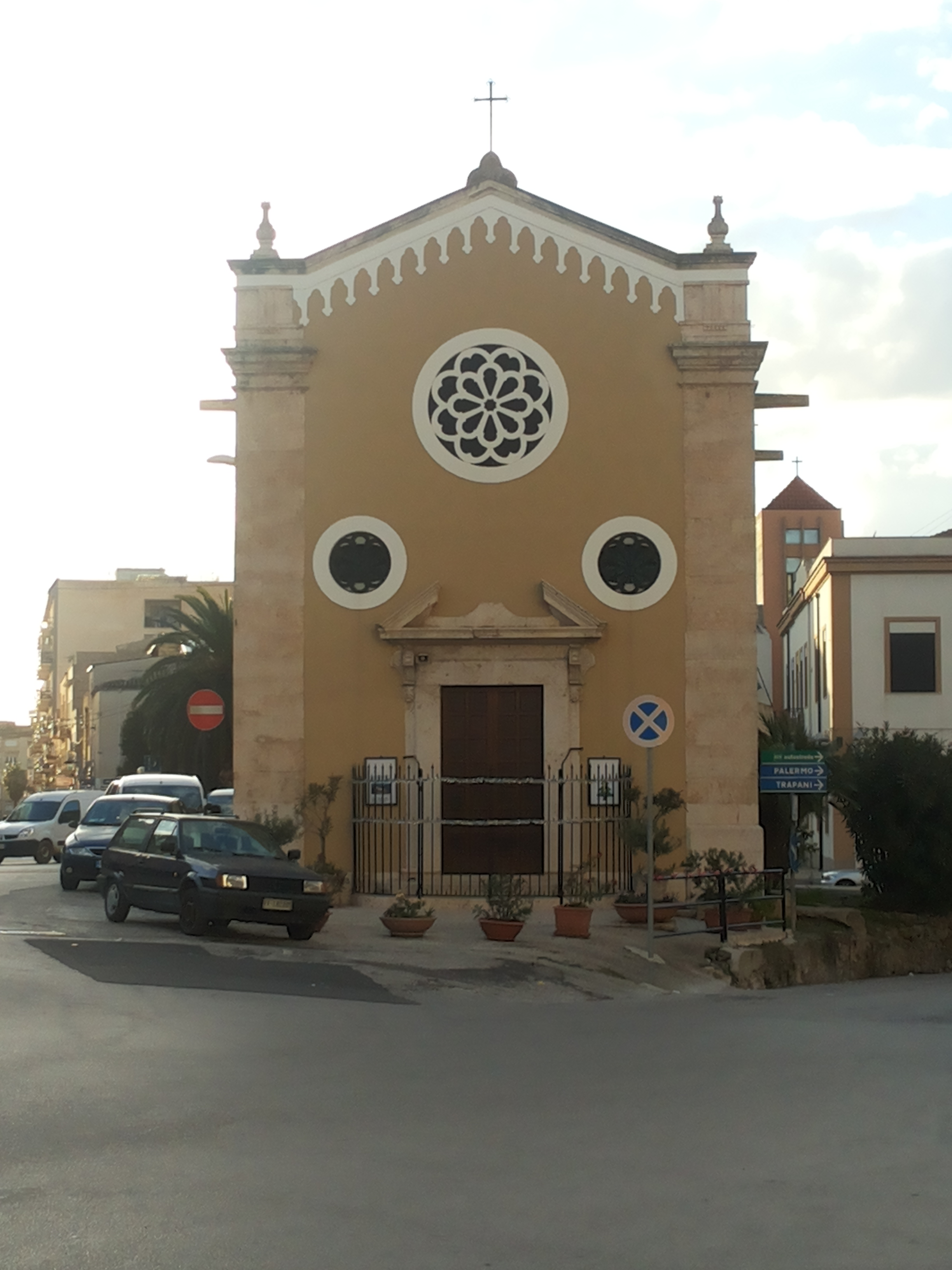
- The façade

Religion
- Affiliation: Catholic
- Province: province of Trapani
- Region: Sicily
- Rite: Catholic
- Patron: Our Lady of Graces

Location
- Location: Alcamo, province of Trapani, Italy
- Municipality: Alcamo
- State: Italy
- Interactive map of Santa Maria delle Grazie
- Territory: Alcamo
- Coordinates: 37°58′48″N 12°57′20″E

Architecture
- Groundbreaking: 17th century

Santa Maria delle Grazie is a Catholic church located in Alcamo, in the province of Trapani.

== History ==
Initially it was a small chapel built in the 17th century; in 1619 they put an image that Pietro Maria Rocca, a scholar from Alcamo, thought it was the triptych realized in 1462 on a board, and moved to the National Museum of Palermo in 1865.

The chapel was enlarged between the years 1626 and 1636, after an event happened on 21 June 1625: miraculously in front of it, the cart carrying the plague victims to the cemetery of Saint Ippolito broke irremediably, the sign that plague had finished.

== Description and works ==
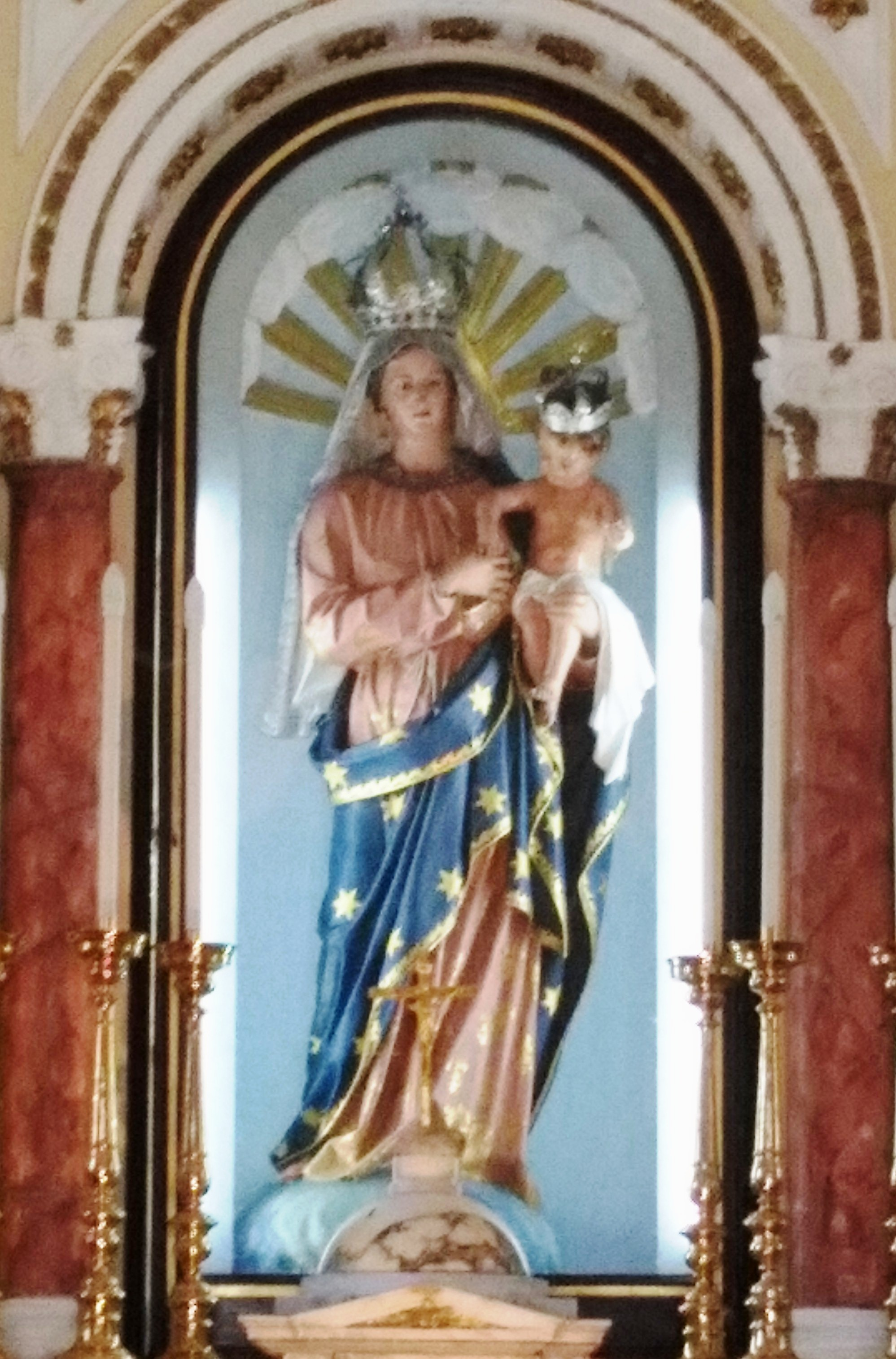
Statue of Our Lady of Graces (1925)

The façade was carved by Domenico Marchese in 1627. The church was then restored in 1898, and in 1914 it was frescoed by Liborio Mirabile, a painter from Alcamo.

A sculptor from Palermo, Paolo La Licata, realized the white marble high altar and the floor with polychrome marbles, after the design created in 1914 by Francesco Alesi, a priest and painter from Alcamo.

The Church is with one nave and three altars:

- High altar: statue of Our Lady of Graces (1925), realized by the firm Malecore from Lecce
- Right altar: statue of Saint Joseph.
- Left altar: statue of Saint Lucy.

On the south side, on the external wall of the church, there is a wayside shrine with a statue of the Virgin and Child, called Madonna del buon viaggio an Ebron (that is Madonna of the Good Trip to Ebron). In June 2015 it was subject of an act of sacrilege, in fact they broke an arm of the child Jesus and took it away.

Every year on 2 July, after a triduum of liturgical preparation, they carry the simulacrum of the Madonna in procession as far as the Salesian Oratory in the Church of the Holy Souls, where the end of the festivity takes place.

In 1929 they founded the male Congregation of Mary Most Holy of Graces, which had the scope of solemnizing her feast and the Forty Hours Devotion. It has not been existing for years.

== Sources ==
- Carlo Cataldo, Guida storico-artistica dei beni culturali di Alcamo-Calatafimi-Castellammare del Golfo p. 83-84; Alcamo, Sarograf, 1982
- Salvatore Messina, Alcamo nella storia, nella leggenda e nell'arte p. 141, Alcamo, ed. Campo, 2015
