= Santa Maria delle Grazie, Pesaro =

Church building in Pesaro, Italy

Santa Maria delle Grazie is a Roman Catholic church or oratory located on via San Francesco in Pesaro, region of Marche, Italy.

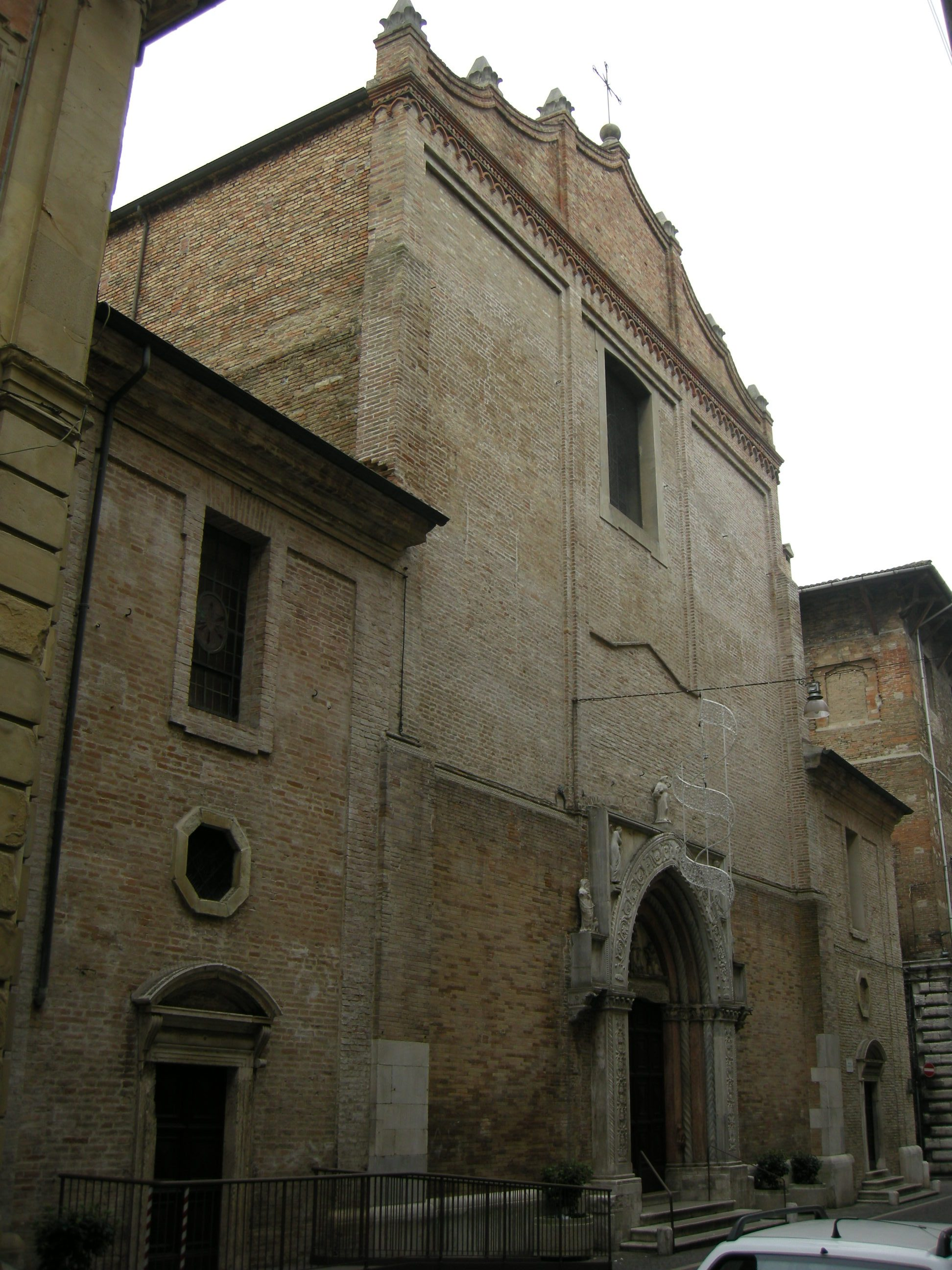
Church façade

== History ==
The church was commissioned by the Servite order. By 1233 they occupied a convent adjacent to this church. The site was ceded to the Franciscan order, who built the church we see today, and consecrated and dedicated it to St Francis (San Francesco) in 1359. The elaborate marble portal was built between 1356 and 1373. During the siege of the city in 1503, the bell-tower was destroyed. In the 1600s, the church underwent reconstruction with the present brick facade.

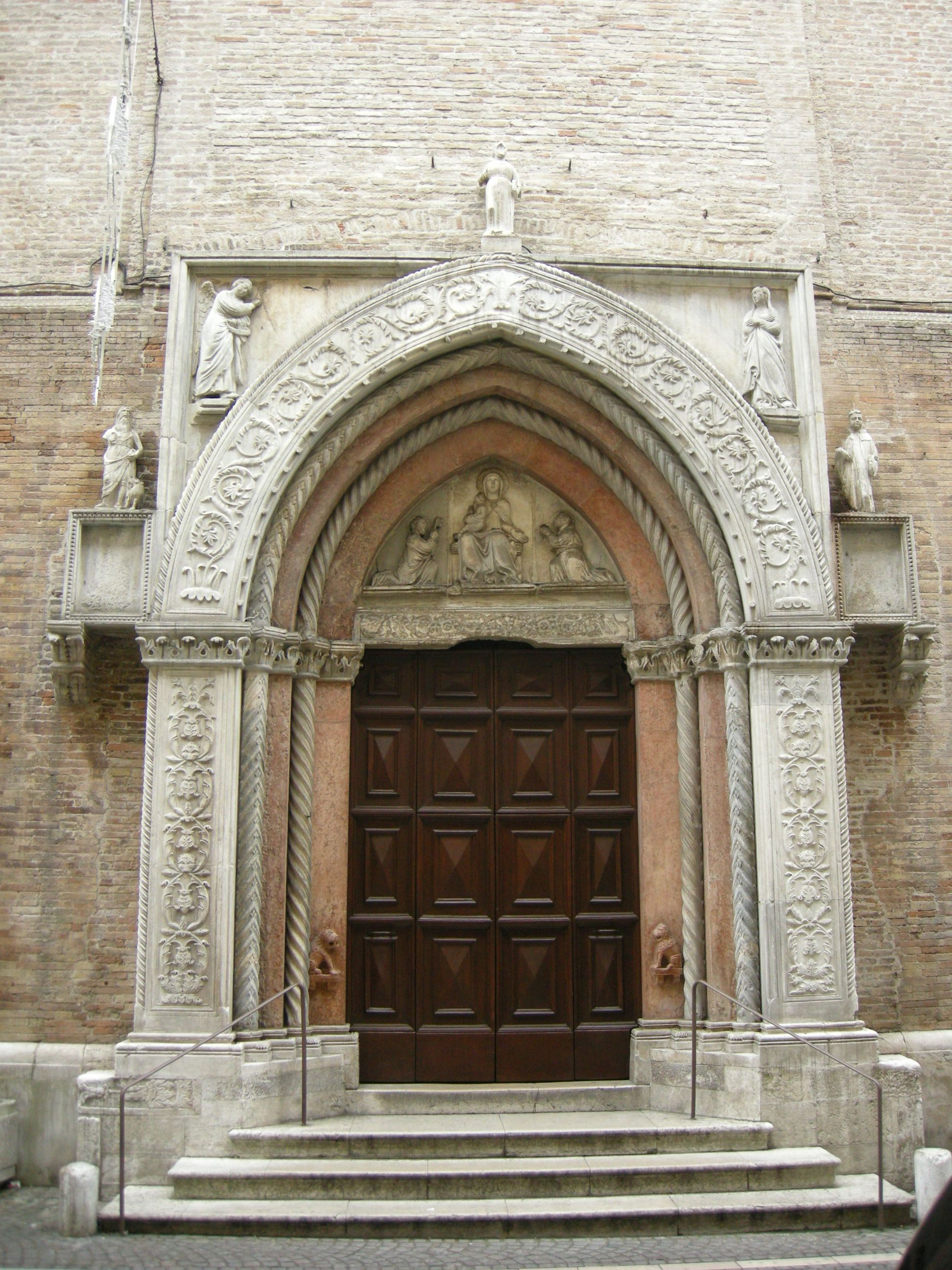
Main Portal

In 1922, the church changed from San Francesco to become the Sanctuary of the Madonna delle Grazie, when the venerated image of Vergine delle Grazie, was moved here from the Servite church. The church has funeral monument for the Beata Michelina Metelli (died 1356), commissioned by Pandolfo II Malatesta after he was rescued from a shipwreck. It has a funeral monument for Paola Orsini, the second wife of Pandolfo II Malatesta, who died in 1371. The church was once rich with 13th and 14th-century frescoes. The church once held altarpieces by Timoteo Viti, Federico Barocci, and Giovanni Giacomo Pandolfi.
