= Doubting Thomas =

Episode from the Gospel of John

The Incredulity of Saint Thomas by Caravaggio, c. 1602

A doubting Thomas is a skeptic who refuses to believe without direct personal experience—a reference to the Gospel of John's depiction of the Apostle Thomas, who, in John's account, refused to believe the resurrected Jesus had appeared to the ten other apostles until he could see and feel Jesus's crucifixion wounds.

In art, the episode (formally called the Incredulity of Thomas) has been frequently depicted since at least the 6th century, with its depiction reflecting a range of theological interpretations.

== Gospel account ==
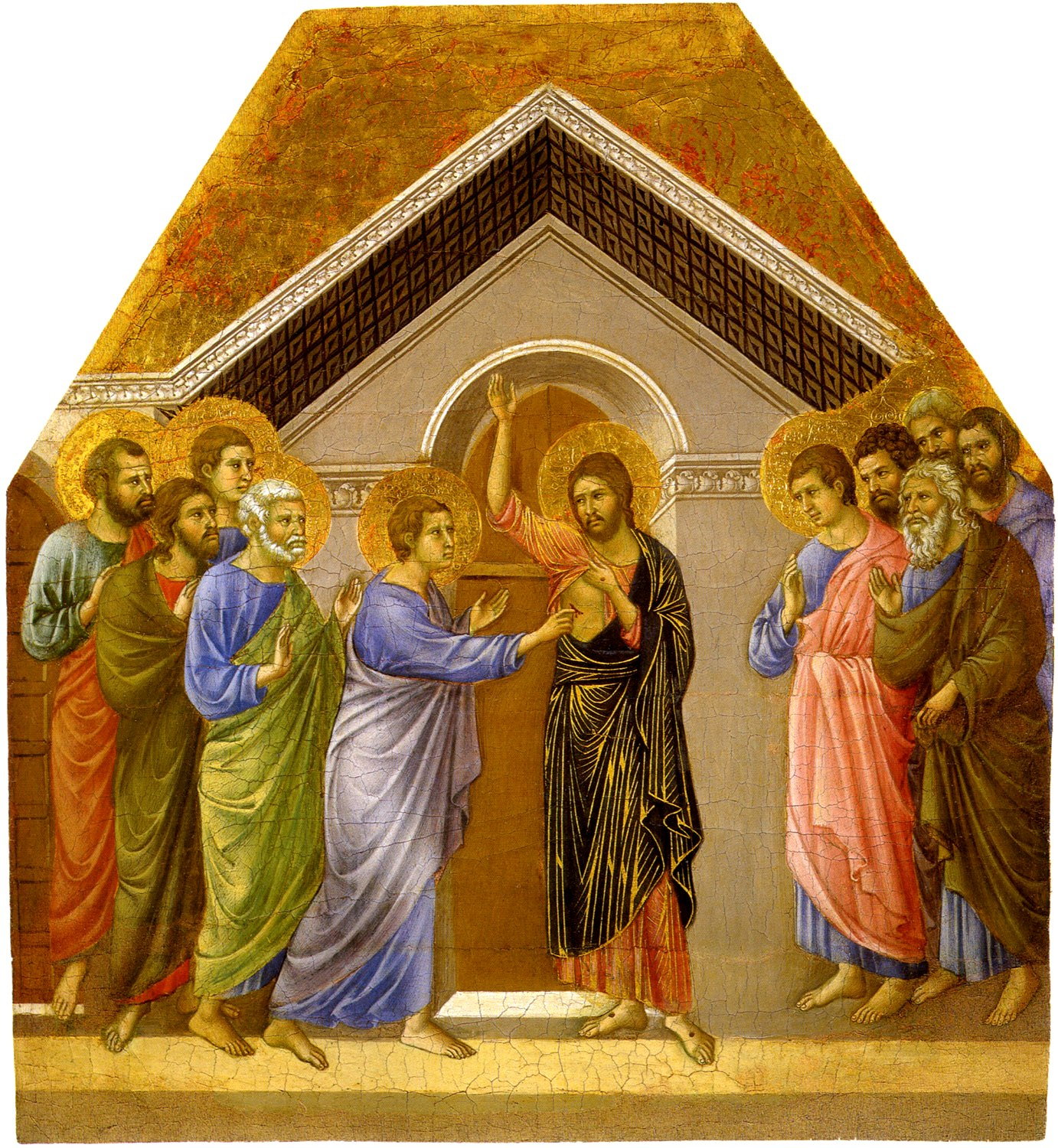
Duccio, a panel from his Maestà (1308–1311)

The episode is related in chapter 20 of the Gospel of John, but not in the three synoptic Gospels. The text of the King James Version is as follows:

24 But Thomas, one of the twelve, called Didymus, was not with them when Jesus came.
25 The other disciples therefore said unto him, We have seen the Lord. But he said unto them, Except I shall see in his hands the print of the nails, and put my finger into the print of the nails, and thrust my hand into his side, I will not believe.
26 And after eight days again his disciples were within, and Thomas with them: then came Jesus, the doors being shut, and stood in the midst, and said, Peace be unto you.
27 Then saith he to Thomas, Reach hither thy finger, and behold my hands; and reach hither thy hand, and thrust it into my side: and be not faithless, but believing.
28 And Thomas answered and said unto him, My Lord and my God.
29 Jesus saith unto him, Thomas, because thou hast seen me, thou hast believed: blessed are they that have not seen, and yet have believed.

Commentators have noted that John avoids saying whether Thomas actually did "thrust" his hand in. Before the Protestant Reformation the usual belief, reflected in artistic depictions, was that he had done so, which most Catholic writers continued to believe, while Protestant writers often thought that he had not.

Regardless of the question of whether Thomas had felt as well as "seen" the physical evidence of the Resurrection of Jesus, the Catholic interpretation was that, although Jesus asserts the superiority of those who have faith without physical evidence, he was nonetheless willing to show Thomas his wound, and let him feel it. This was used by theologians as biblical encouragement for the use of physical experiences such as pilgrimages, veneration of relics and ritual in reinforcing Christian beliefs.

Protestant theologians emphasized Jesus's statement of the superiority of "faith alone" (see sola fide), although the evangelical-leaning Anglican Thomas Hartwell Horne, in his widely read Introduction to the Critical Study and Knowledge of the Holy Scriptures (first published in 1818) treated Thomas's incredulity, which he extended somewhat to the other apostles, approvingly, as evidence both of the veracity of the gospels, as a "forger" would be unlikely to have invented it, and of their proper suspicion of the seemingly impossible, demonstrating their reliability as witnesses. In the early church, Gnostic authors were very insistent that Thomas did not actually examine Jesus, and elaborated on this in apocryphal accounts, perhaps tending to push their non-Gnostic opponents in the other direction.

The theological interpretation of the episode has concentrated on it as a demonstration of the reality of the resurrection, but as early as the writings of the 4th- and 5th-century saints John Chrysostom and Cyril of Alexandria it had been given a eucharistic interpretation, seen as an allegory of the sacrament of the Eucharist, which remained a recurring theme in commentary.

== Art ==
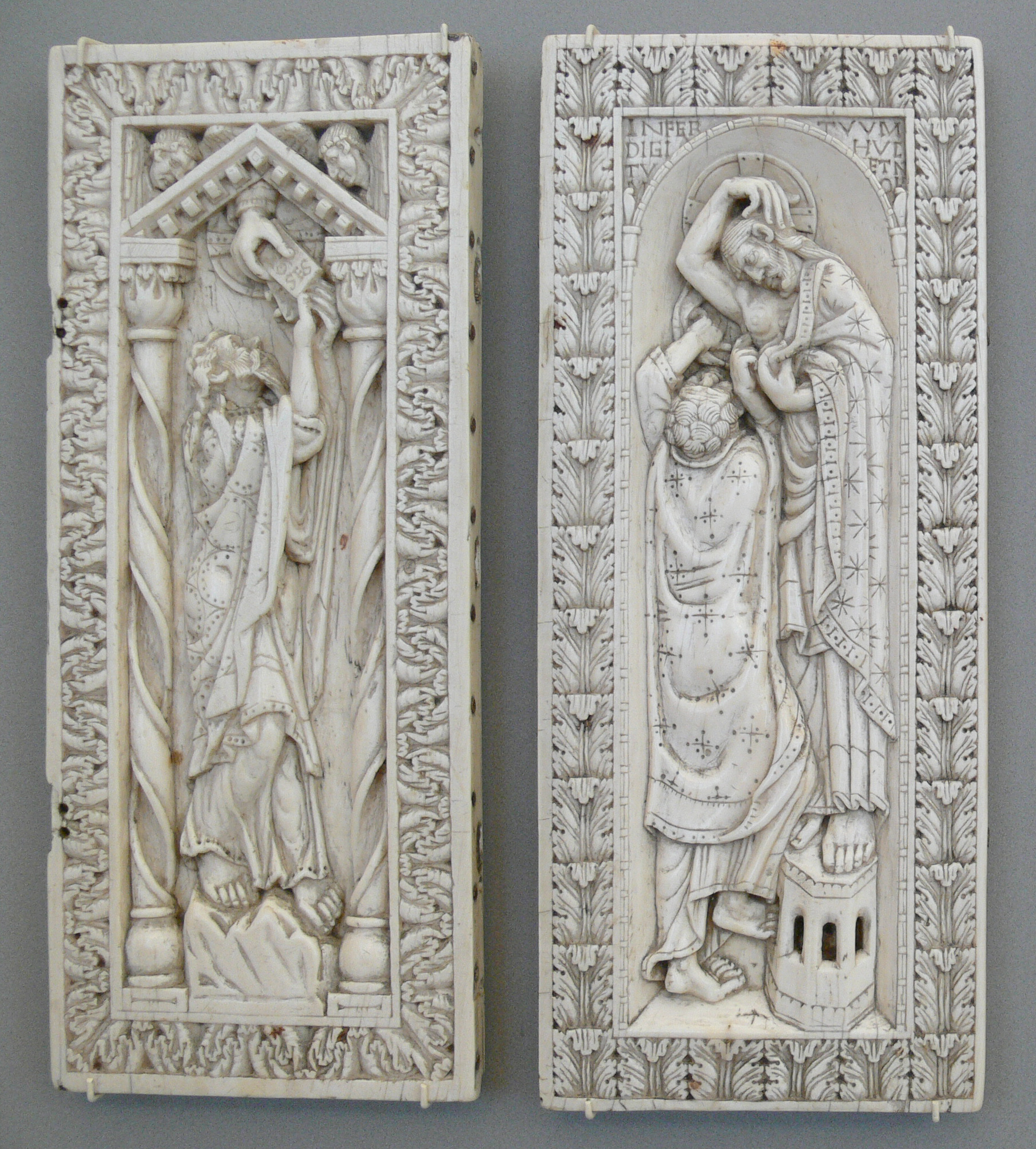
Ottonian ivory diptych

In art this subject, formally termed The Incredulity of Saint Thomas, has been common since at least the early 6th century, when it appears in the mosaics at Basilica of Sant'Apollinare Nuovo in Ravenna, and on the Monza ampullae. In those depictions, as later in the Baroque, the subject, normally depicted at the moment Thomas puts his fingers into Jesus's side, was used to emphasize the importance of physical experiences and evidences for the believer, as described above. The Ravenna mosaic introduces the motif of Jesus raising his hand high to reveal the wound in his side; his pose often, but not always, is such that the wounds on his hands can also be seen, and often those on his feet as well.

The scene was used in a number of contexts in medieval art, including Byzantine icons. Where there was room all the apostles were often shown, and sometimes Thomas's acceptance of the Resurrection is shown, with Thomas kneeling and Jesus blessing him. This iconography leaves it unclear whether the moment shown follows an examination or not, but probably suggests that it does not, especially in Protestant art. From the late Middle Ages onwards a number of variations of the poses of the two figures occur (see gallery). The typical "touching" representation formed one of a number of scenes sometimes placed around a central Crucifixion of Jesus, and is one of the scenes shown on the Irish Muiredach's High Cross, and the subject of a large relief in the famous Romanesque sculpted cloister at the Abbey of Santo Domingo de Silos. In works showing pairs of typologically related scenes from the Old and New Testaments it could be paired with Jacob Wrestling with the Angel, but in a 10th-century Ottonian ivory diptych it is paired with Moses receiving the Law, comparing both the two Biblical Testaments and the support for the faith from both textual "sacred writ" and physical evidences.

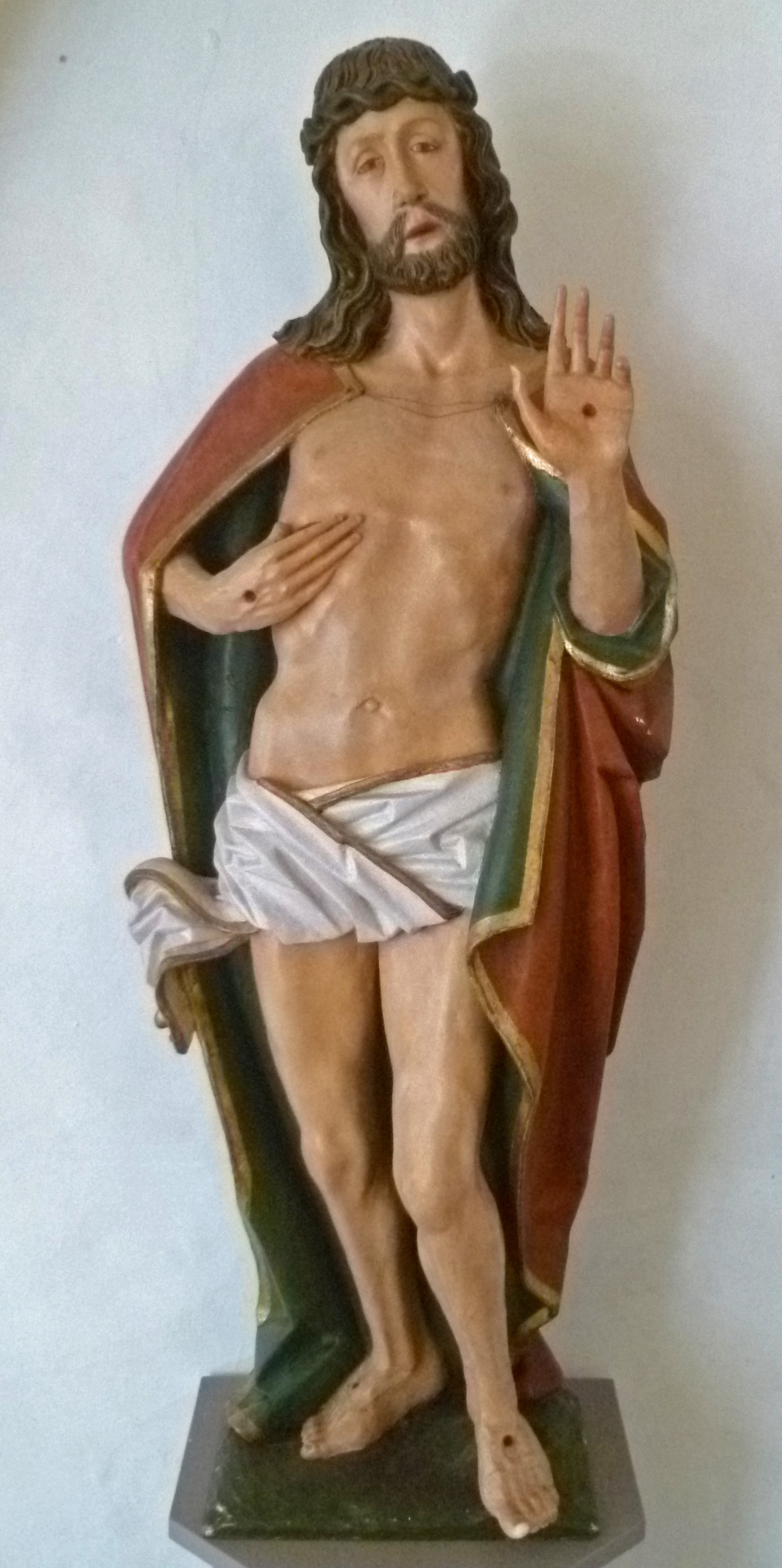
Ostentatio vulnerum

In the later Middle Ages Jesus with one side of his robe pulled back, displaying the wound in his side and his other four wounds (called the ostentatio vulnerum), was taken from images with Thomas and turned into a pose adopted by Jesus alone, who often places his own fingers into the wound in his side. This form became a common feature of single iconic figures of Jesus and subjects such as the Last Judgement (where Bamberg Cathedral has an early example of about 1235), Christ in Majesty, the Man of Sorrows and Christ with the Arma Christi, and was used to emphasize Christ's suffering as well as the fact of his Resurrection.

In the Renaissance the famous sculpted pair of Christ and St. Thomas by Andrea del Verrocchio (1467–1483) for the Orsanmichele in Florence is the best known representation; the subject is rare in free-standing sculpture. This guild church also housed commercial tribunals, and the presentation of physical evidence gave the subject a particular relevance to courts and justice, and it appeared on many other buildings in Tuscany with judicial functions. The Medici family, heavily involved in the commission, also had a particular association with St Thomas, though the painting by Salviati seems to reflect anti-Medici feeling in the 1540s.

The subject enjoyed a revival in popularity in Counter-Reformation art as an assertion of Catholic doctrine against Protestant rejection of the Catholic practices which the episode was held to support, and Protestant belief in "faith alone". In the Catholic interpretation, although Jesus asserts the superiority of those who have faith without physical evidence, he was nonetheless willing to show Thomas his wound, and let him feel it. The Incredulity of Saint Thomas by Caravaggio (c. 1601–1602) is now the most famous depiction (unusually showing Thomas to the viewer's right of Jesus), but there are many others, especially by the Utrecht Caravaggisti, painting in a Protestant environment, such as the Flemish Caravaggist Matthias Stom, whose two versions of the subject are now in Madrid and Bergamo. Both Rembrandt (Pushkin Museum) and Rubens (centrepiece of the Rockox Triptych, Royal Museum of Fine Arts, Antwerp) also painted it.

== Gallery ==
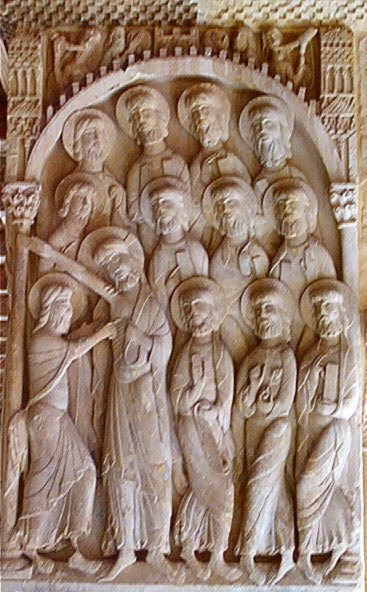
Relief in the Romanesque cloister at the Abbey of Santo Domingo de Silos, c. 1150

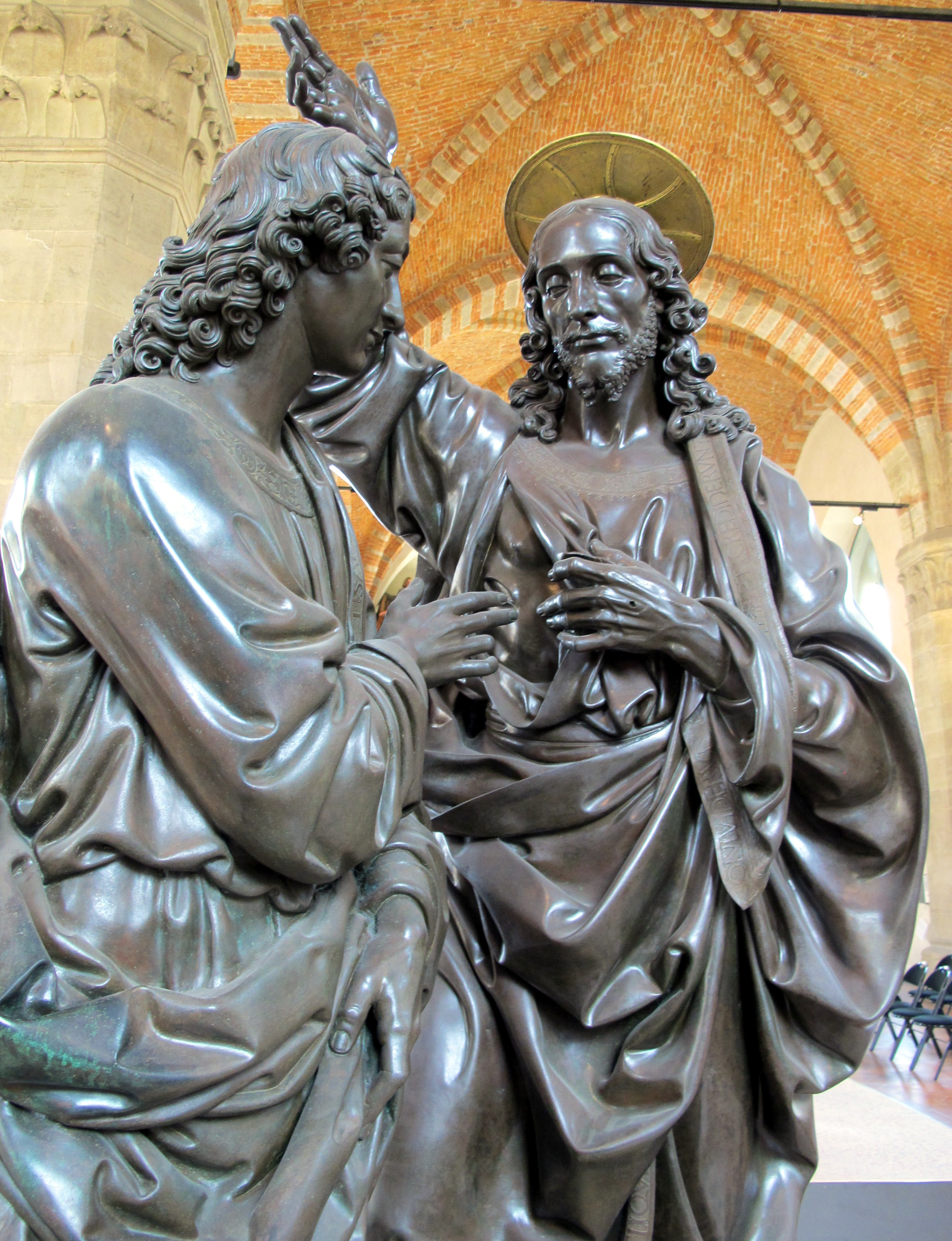
Christ and St. Thomas by Andrea del Verrocchio (1467–1483)

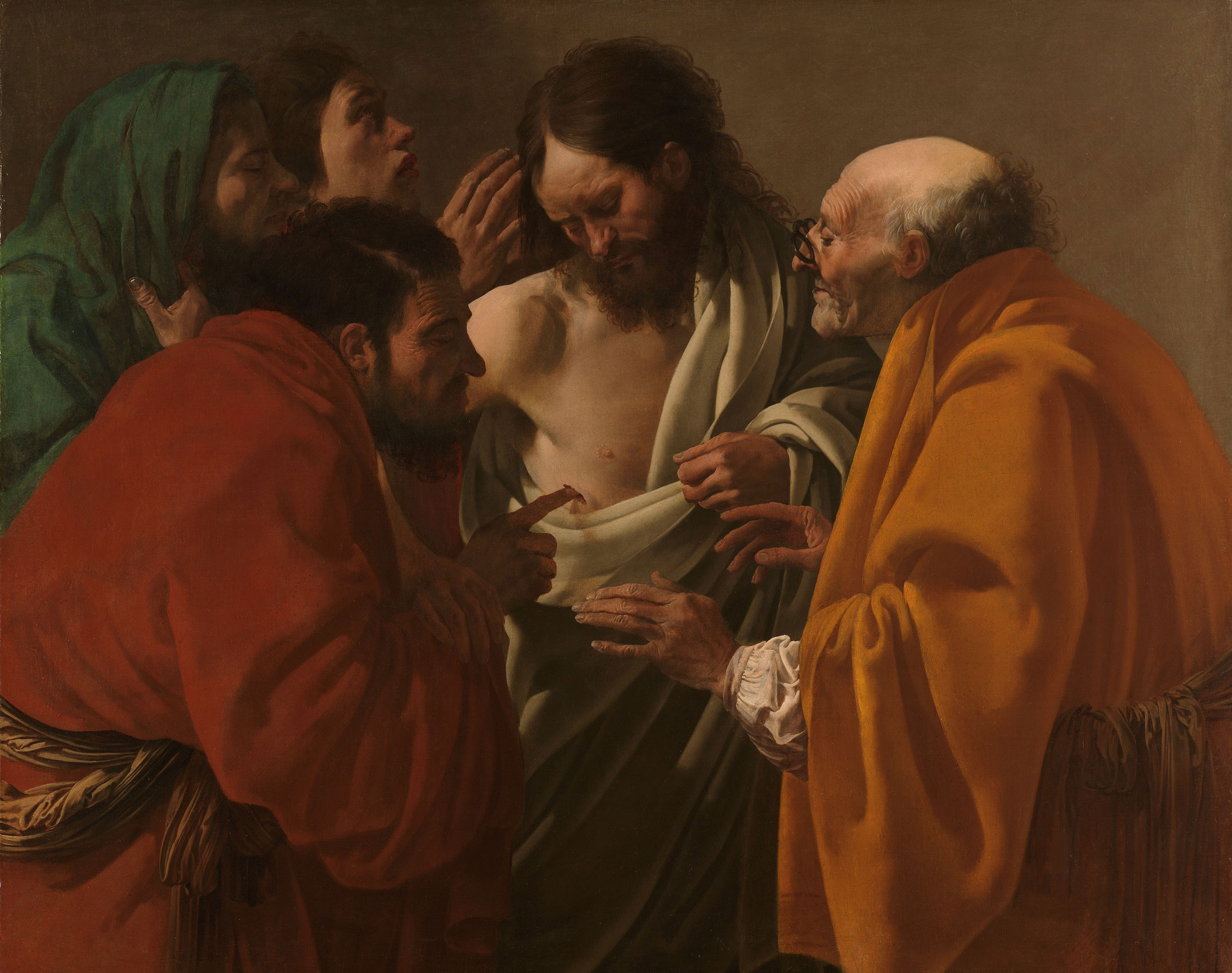
Hendrick ter Brugghen, c. 1622

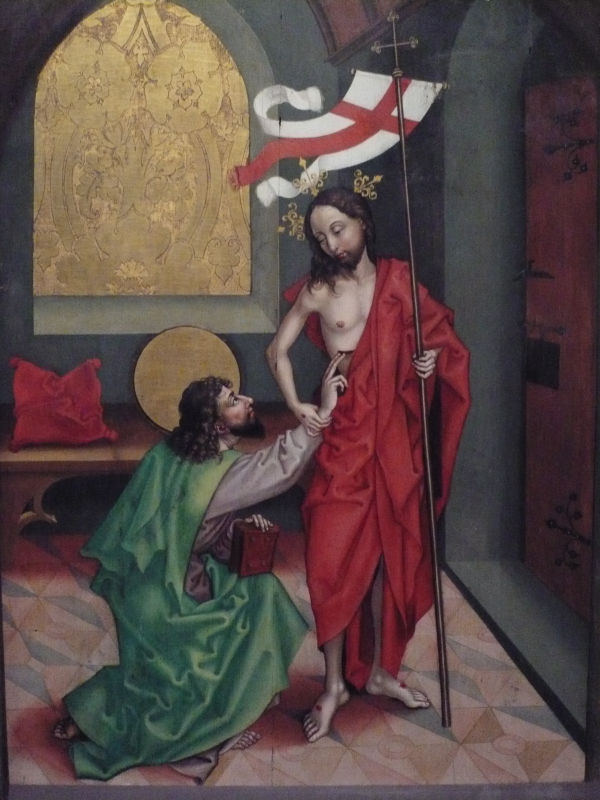
Kneeling and touching, Martin Schongauer and workshop, panel from a late 15th-century altarpiece

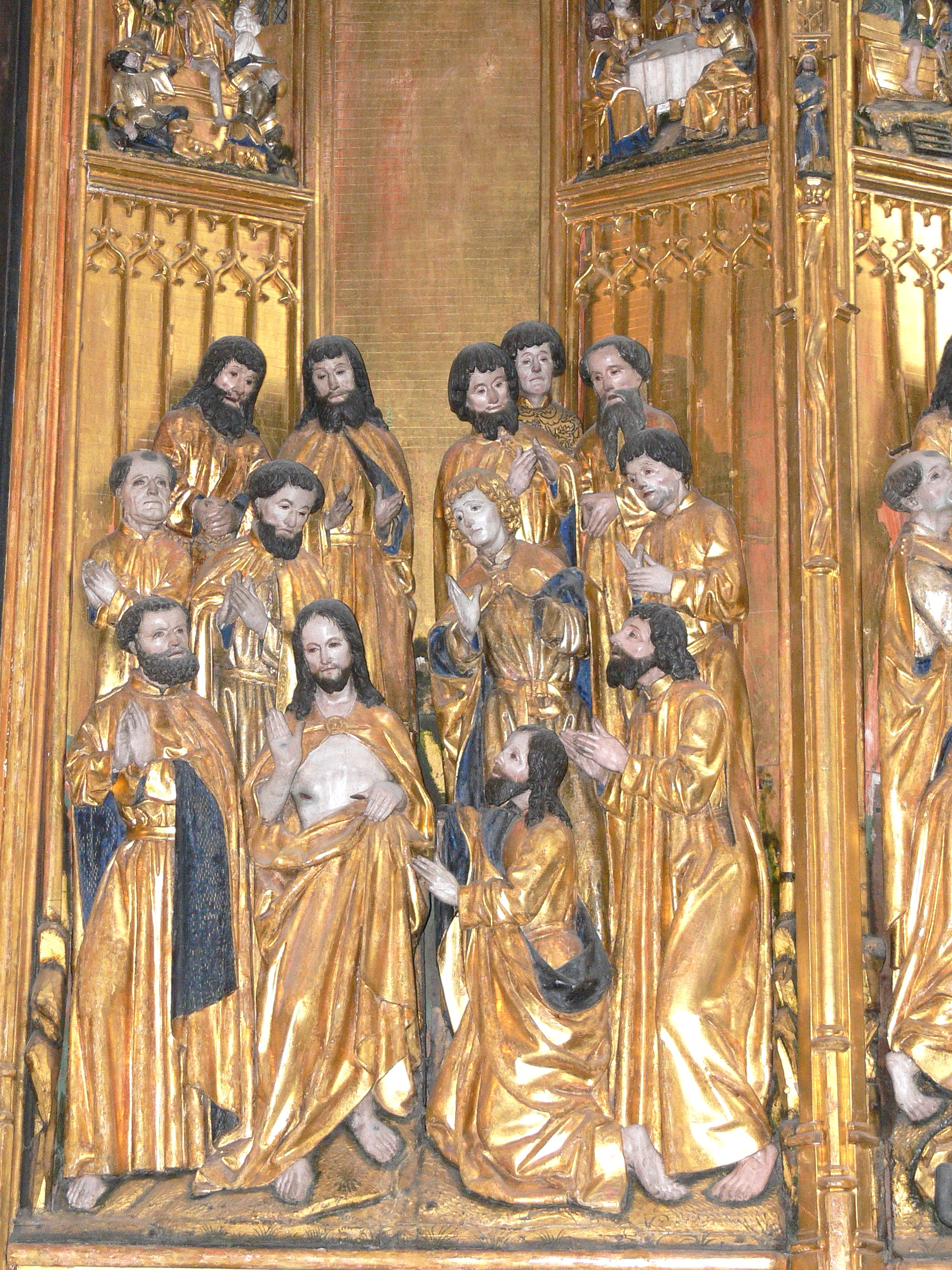
Kneeling and showing, early 16th-century Swedish carved wood altarpiece, Strängnäs Cathedral

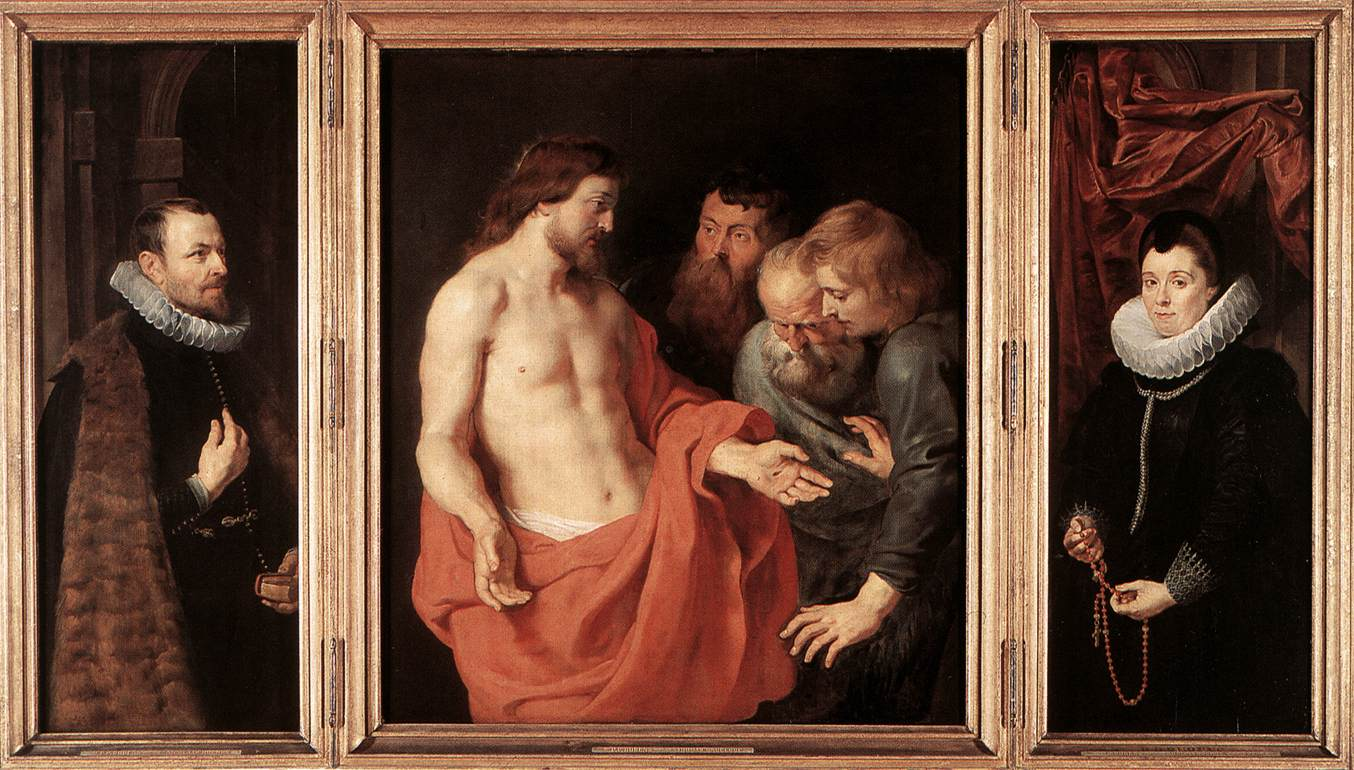
Rubens, the Rockox Altarpiece (1613–1615), showing the hands, with an "almost invisible" wound on the "wrong" side; with donor portraits of Nicolaas II Rockox.

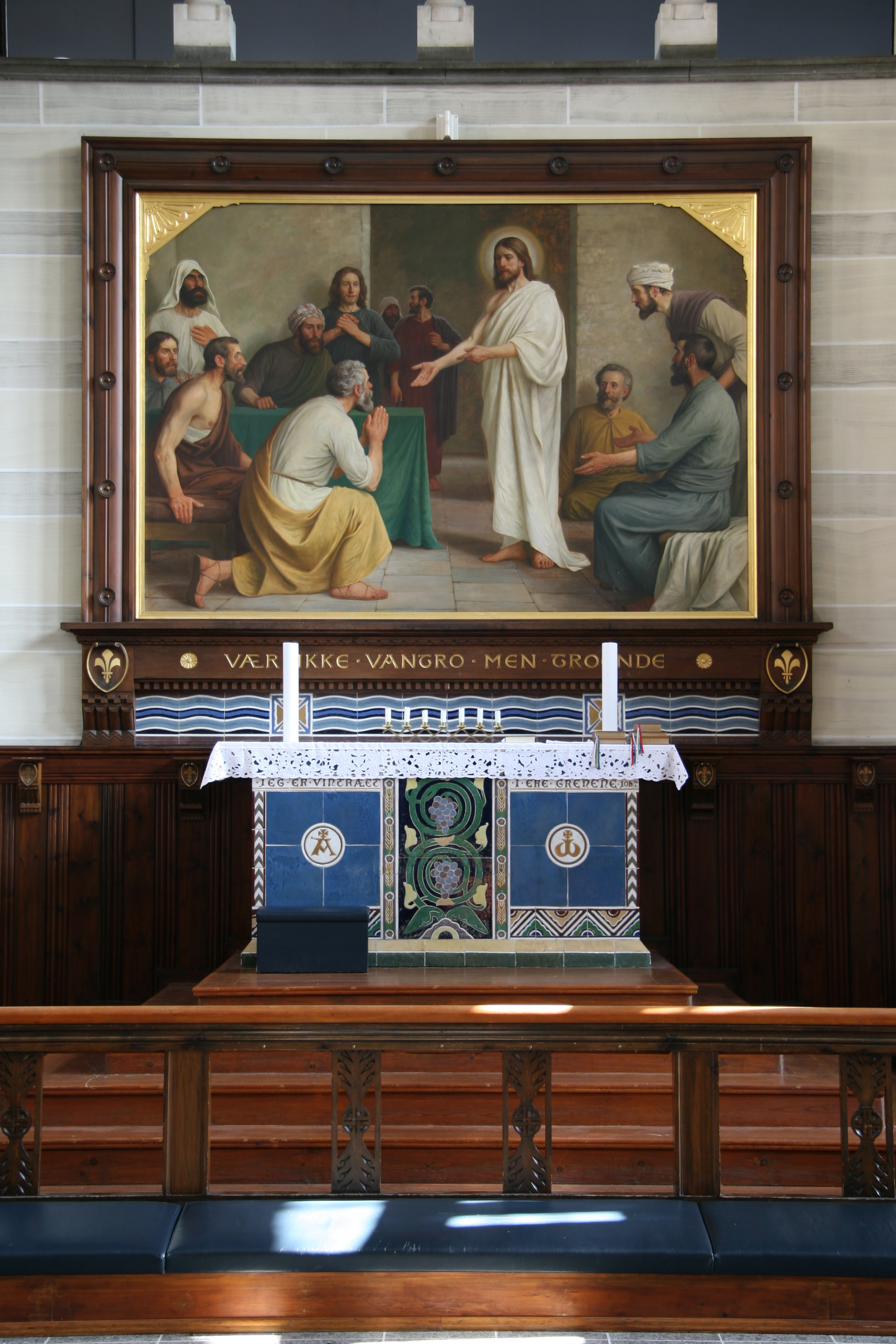
A 19th-century Danish Lutheran "non-touching" composition

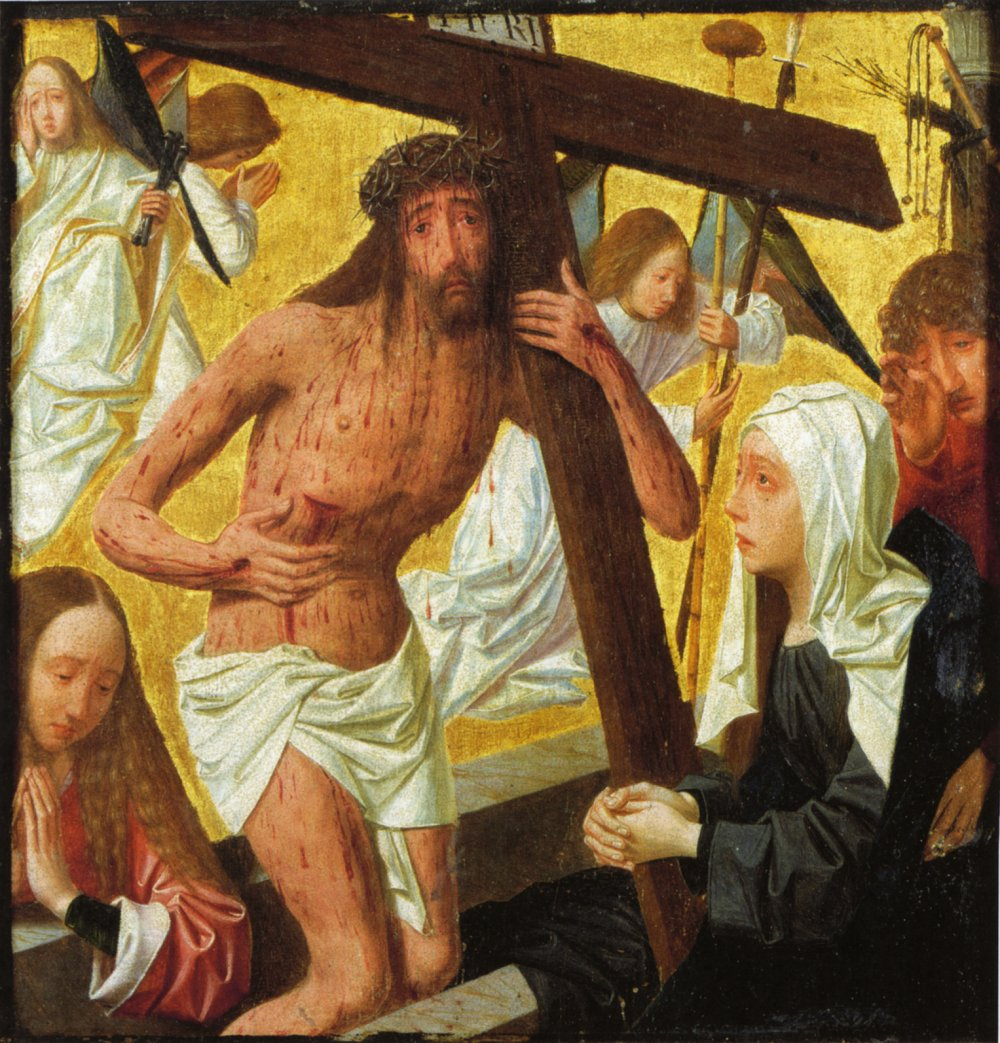
The ostentatio vulnerum in an especially complex Man of Sorrows by Geertgen tot Sint Jans (c. 1485–1495)

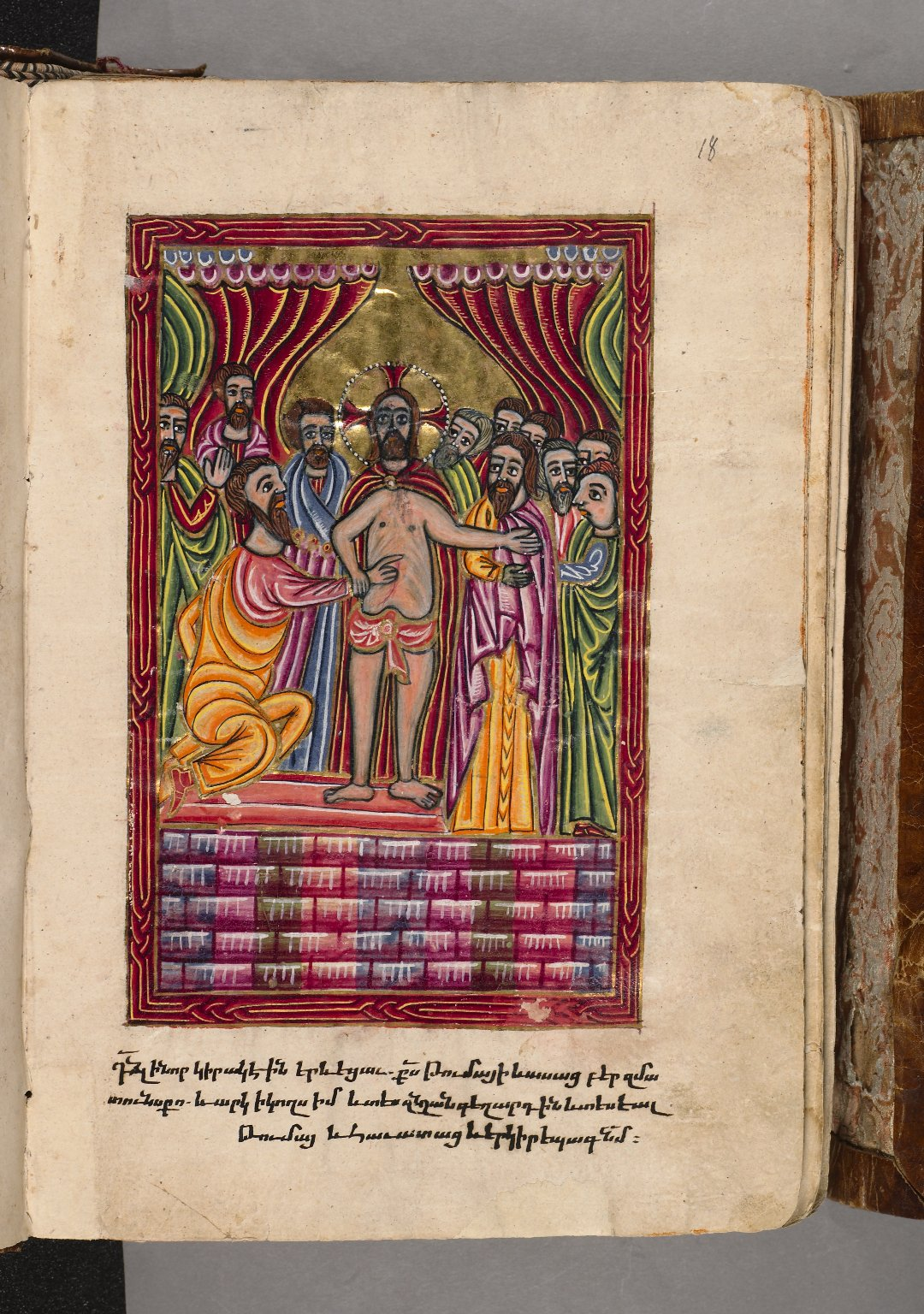
From an Armenian Gospels manuscript dated 1609, held by the Bodleian Library

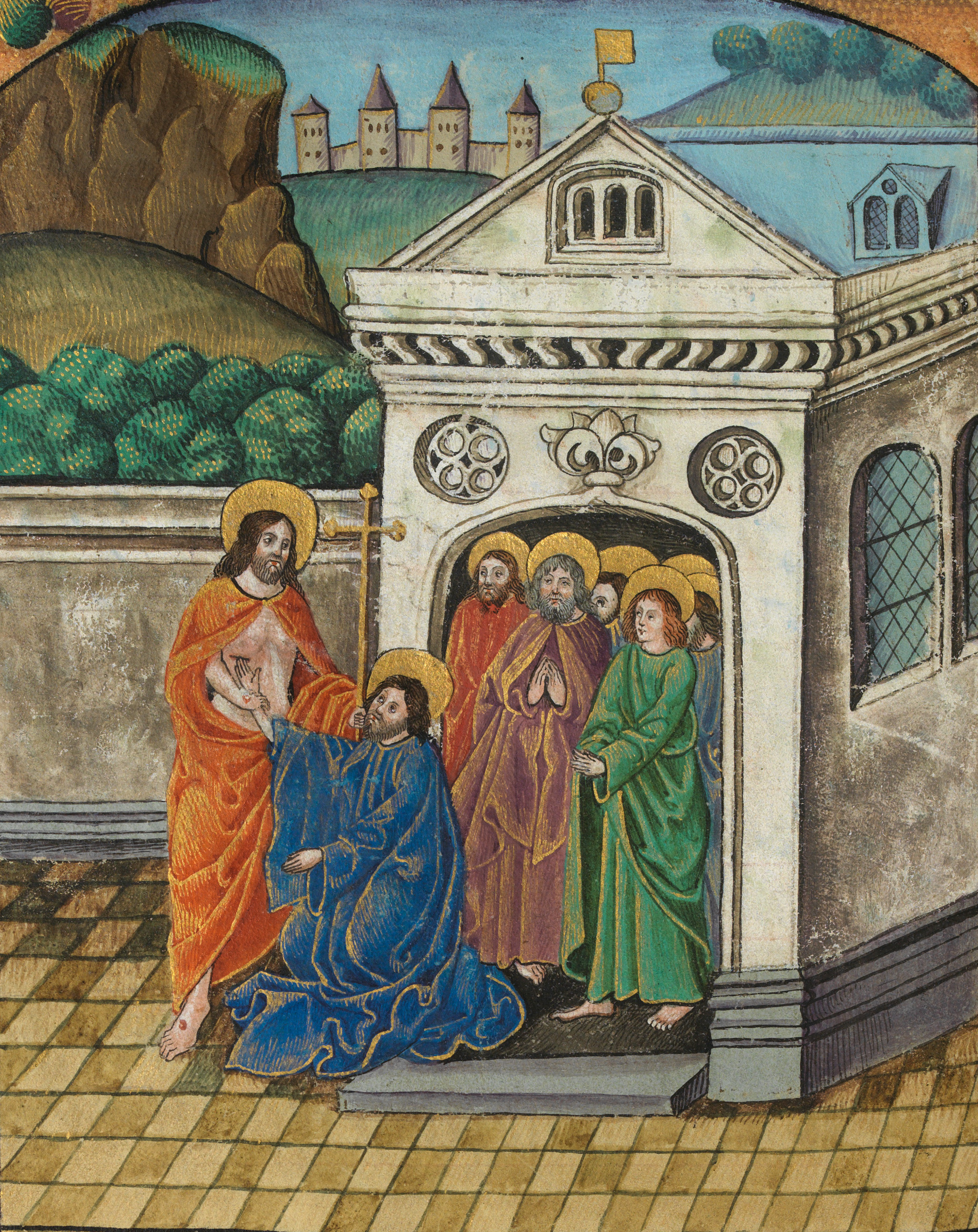
"The incredulity of Thomas" from an English manuscript, c. 1504

== Medieval drama ==
The dramatic nature of the episode meant that it often featured in medieval drama telling the story of the life of Jesus. It takes the whole of "Play 41" of the York Mystery Cycle, probably dating from some time between 1463 and 1477, which takes 195 six-line stanzas to tell it. Other shorter cycles omit it, and the Chester Mystery Plays take 70 lines to cover it. Thomas also appears in the Cornish language Ordinalia.

== Related legends ==
The biblical episode generated two late medieval legends or stories, which also appear in art.

=== Girdle of Thomas ===
In this story, at the Assumption of Mary, where the other apostles were present, Thomas once again missed the occasion (being on his way back from his mission to India), so the Virgin Mary, aware of Thomas's sceptical nature, appeared to him individually and dropped the girdle (cloth belt) she was wearing down onto him, to give him a physical proof of what he had seen. In other versions he is present at the actual Assumption, and the Virgin dropped her girdle down to him as she was taken up to heaven. The supposed girdle itself (Sacra Cintola) is a relic of Prato Cathedral, and its veneration was regarded as especially helpful for pregnant women. After Florence took control of Prato in 1350–51, the girdle begins to feature in Florentine art and to be shown worn by figures of Madonna del Parto, iconic figures showing the Virgin Mary when pregnant.

The first version of the story is called the Madonna of the Girdle in art. An altarpiece by Palma Vecchio, now in the Brera Gallery in Milan, shows an intermediate version, with Thomas hurrying towards the other apostles, and the Virgin taking off her girdle. In other works Thomas is catching the falling girdle, or has received the girdle and holds it.

=== Incredulity of Jerome ===
Saint Francis of Assisi (1181/1182 – 1226) had a vision in 1224, after which he acquired stigmata on his own body, repeating the wounds of Jesus, which he kept until his death. According to the many who saw them, the wounds on his hands and feet were as if the nails still remained in place, and the nail-like projections could be moved. An early biographer of Francis, Saint Bonaventure (1221–1274), reported that a soldier called Jerome was sceptical and moved the "nails" about. Jerome is thought to be shown examining Francis' feet in the frescos of the Bardi Chapel of Santa Croce, Florence by Giotto and his workshop, and appears in some other Franciscan works.

== See also ==
- Life of Jesus in the New Testament
