= Nils Büttner =

German art historian (born 1967)

- Born: February 9, 1967 (age 59); Bremen, West Germany
- Known for: His work on Peter Paul Rubens; Chair of the Centrum Rubenianum; Editor of the Corpus Rubenianum Ludwig Burchard

Academic background
- Education: University of Göttingen
- Thesis: 'Die Erfindung der Landschaft: Kosmographie und Landschaftskunst im Zeitalter Bruegels' (1998)

Academic work
- Discipline: Art history
- Institutions: State Academy of Fine Arts Stuttgart
- Main interests: Early Modern art, Peter Paul Rubens, Hieronymus Bosch, Johannes Vermeer, landscape painting, iconography, printmaking, art attribution, digital methods in art history
- Notable works: Hieronymus Bosch: Visions and Nightmares (2016); Vermeer: De schilder die de tijd stilzet (2023)

Nils Büttner (born 9 February 1967 in Bremen) is a German art historian and curator. Büttner is Professor of History at the State Academy of Fine Arts Stuttgart and chairman of the Centrum Rubenianum.

Most of his work is on Peter Paul Rubens and Early Modern European art. Büttner editor the Corpus Rubenianum, the catalogue raisonné of Rubens’s work.

He has also written extensively on Hieronymus Bosch, Johannes Vermeer, and Rembrandt. Büttner is also active in contemporary debates on art attribution and the use of artificial intelligence in authentication.

== Biography ==
Büttner studied art history, folklore, and classical archaeology. He got his PhD from the University of Göttingen. His dissertation was titled Die Erfindung der Landschaft: Kosmographie und Landschaftskunst im Zeitalter Bruegels ("The Invention of Landscape: Cosmography and Landscape Art in the Age of Bruegel").

He worked as a research assistant at the University of Göttingen (1998-1999), where he catalogued the collection’s drawings. He later held positions at the Herzog Anton Ulrich Museum in Braunschweig—first as a curatorial trainee (1999), then as an exhibition curator (2000–2001). He was a research associate at the Technical University of Dortmund (2001-2008). In 2004/05, he completed his habilitation at Dortmund with the study Herr P. P. Rubens. Von der Kunst, berühmt zu werden ("Mr. P. P. Rubens: On the Art of Becoming Famous").

Büttner has since held the Chair for Medieval and Modern Art History at the State Academy of Fine Arts Stuttgart. His academic work focuses on the visual culture of the Early Modern period in Germany and the Netherlands, as well as the history of printmaking and book illustration. He is also the chair (since 2021) of the Centrum Rubenianum in Antwerp and general editor of the Corpus Rubenianum Ludwig Burchard, the catalogue raisonné of the works of Peter Paul Rubens.

In Hieronymus Bosch: Visions and Nightmares, , Büttner works from the surviving records and throws out much of the legend that has grown up around Bosch. In his 2016 review, Tim Smith-Laing of The Telegraph found the English translation poor and the prose too academic. Recent research, he wrote, already doubted that Bosch painted several of the works Büttner discusses. It came out as scholars and the public returned to Bosch for the five-hundredth anniversary of his death.

In 2023 Büttner published a book on the Dutch painter Johannes Vermeer, Vermeer: De schilder die de tijd stilzet (“Vermeer: The Painter Who Stops Time”). Critics found it clear and accessible. Büttner ties Vermeer’s life, technique and iconography to their period and reads the paintings for their symbolic and moral content, rejecting speculation about the people in them. The Supper at Emmaus, a forgery once accepted as a Vermeer, is his example.

In 2022–2023, Büttner co-curated the exhibition Rubens in Genoa (at the Palazzo Ducale in Genoa) during which his co-curator, art historian Anna Orlando, referred to him as “the highest authority on Rubens in the world.” The exhibition commemorated the 400th anniversary of Rubens’s publication Palazzi di Genova and explored the artist’s deep connections to the city’s aristocracy and architecture. The exhibition featured several new discoveries, including a version of The Resurrected Christ Appears to His Mother, attributed to Rubens and his workshop, and an unpublished sketch for The Miracles of St. Ignatius.

In 2023, Büttner co-authored an article with Jesuit priest Stephan Ch. Kessler on Rubens’s late painting Crucifixion of Saint Peter (1638–1640), located in the parish church of Sankt Peter in Cologne. Recent conservation of the painting gave Büttner new evidence. He reinterprets both its emotional force and its theology, and argues that it is among Rubens’s most personal religious works.

Büttner has pushed for the use of artificial intelligence in authenticating art. In 2024 he co-authored a study with the Swiss firm Art Recognition that used A.I. to test a painting attributed to Anthony van Dyck. He called the project “proof that [A.I.] works.” Büttner has still rejected some A.I. attributions. One claimed that Rubens painted part of a version of The Bath of Diana in a French private collection. Büttner disputed it on the strength of a 2016 condition report by Gregory Martin and his own examination of the painting in 2023: neither the technique nor the style, he said, was Rubens’s. As chairman of the ‘’Centrum Rubenianum’’, he also questioned a related fragment in the Museum Boijmans Van Beuningen. He argued that the fragment, once taken for a studio work, probably does not derive from Rubens’s lost original and may come from the workshop’s general output. Büttner has stated that while A.I. may offer useful supplementary insights, it must be supported by expert connoisseurship and material analysis.

Besides his work on Rubens and Early Modern Flemish painting, Büttner has also written on the life and art of Hieronymus Bosch. His 2016 book, Hieronymus Bosch: Visions and Nightmares, published during the quincentenary of Bosch's death, was released in conjunction with a wave of public interest in the artist, including the international documentary Touched by the Devil. In the book, Büttner emphasizes rigorous historical evidence and the techniques employed by the Bosch Research and Conservation Project (BRCP), distancing himself from speculative interpretations of Bosch’s work. He also addresses and dismisses myths portraying Bosch as a heretic, instead situating the artist within a devout religious context, including his membership in the Brotherhood of Our Lady.

Büttner has also played a crucial role in the debate over the authenticity of Samson and Delilah, a painting in the collection of the National Gallery, London, attributed to Rubens. The work, acquired in 1980, has been subject to renewed scrutiny by critics and A.I.-based authentication firms, but remains accepted by leading Rubens scholars. As chairman of the Centrum Rubenianum and general editor of the Corpus Rubenianum, Büttner has dismissed claims challenging the painting's attribution as “conspiracy theories,” declining to engage further with recent popular critiques. His position aligns with that of many art historians who emphasize stylistic evolution in Rubens's work and the limits of technical analysis in isolation.

== Selected publications ==
=== Monographs ===
- Büttner, N. (2000). Die Erfindung der Landschaft: Landschaftskunst und Kosmographie im Zeitalter Bruegels. Göttingen: Vandenhoeck & Ruprecht.
- Büttner, N. (2006). Herr P. P. Rubens. Von der Kunst, berühmt zu werden. Göttingen: Vandenhoeck & Ruprecht.
- Büttner, N. (2006). Landscape Painting: A History. New York: Abbeville Press.
- Büttner, N. (2007). Rubens. Munich: C.H. Beck.
- Büttner, N. (2008). Landscape Painting: A History. New York: Abbeville Press.
- Büttner, N. (2010). Vermeer. Munich: C.H. Beck.
- Büttner, N. (2012). Hieronymus Bosch. Munich: C.H. Beck.
- Büttner, N. (2014). Rembrandt: Licht und Schatten. Stuttgart: Reclam.
- Büttner, N. (2014). Einführung in die frühneuzeitliche Ikonographie. Darmstadt: WBG.
- Büttner, N. (2015). Peter Paul Rubens: Eine Biographie. Regensburg: Schnell & Steiner.
- Büttner, N. (2016). Hieronymus Bosch: Visions and nightmares. London: Reaktion Books.
- Büttner, N. (2018). Pieter Bruegel the Elder. Munich: C.H. Beck.
- Büttner, N. (2018). Rubens: Allegories and subjects from literature [Corpus Rubenianum Ludwig Burchard XII] (2 vols.). London–Turnhout: Brepols.
- Büttner, N. (2020). Genre scenes. London: Corpus Rubenianum Ludwig Burchard.
- Büttner, N. (2023). Vermeer: De schilder die de tijd stilzet (M. de Vries & M. Leene, Trans.). Amsterdam: Meulenhoff.
- Büttner, N. (2023). The Medici Series [Corpus Rubenianum Ludwig Burchard XIV, 1] (2 vols.). London–Turnhout: Brepols.

=== Edited volumes ===
- Voermann, I., & Büttner, N. (Eds.). (2012). Das Auge der Welt: Otto Dix und die Neue Sachlichkeit. Ostfildern: Hatje Cantz.
- Poeschel, S., Weissert, C., & Büttner, N. (Eds.). (2013). Zwischen Lust und Frust: Die Kunst in den Niederlanden und am Hof Philipps II. von Spanien (1527–1598). Cologne: Böhlau.
- Blattner, E., Ratzeburg, W., & Büttner, N. (Eds.). (2014). Der fotografierte Krieg. Tübingen: Universitätsstadt Tübingen.
- Lehnert, V., & Büttner, N. (Eds.). (2015). Die Schärfe der Bilder: Die Radierung im Umkreis der Stuttgarter Kunstakademie. Bietigheim-Bissingen: Städtische Galerie.
- Nauhaus, J. M., Pokorny, E., Silver, L., & Büttner, N. (Eds.). (2016). Hieronymus Bosch in the Academy of Fine Arts Vienna. Vienna: Akademie der bildenden Künste.

=== Selected articles ===
- Büttner, N. (2000). "Quid Siculas sequeris per mille pericula terras?". Ein Beitrag zur Biographie Pieter Bruegels d. Ä. und zur Kulturgeschichte der niederländischen Italienreise. Marburger Jahrbuch fur Kunstwissenschaft, 209-242.
- Büttner, N. (2003). Landschaften des Exils? Anmerkungen zu Gillis van Coninxloo und zur Geschichte der flämischen Waldlandschaft aus Anlaß einer Neuerscheinung. Zeitschrift für Kunstgeschichte, 66(H. 4), 546-580.
- Büttner, N., & Kessler, S. Ch. (2023). Gelassenheit im Äußersten: Rubens’ „Kreuzigung Petri“ in Köln. Stimmen der Zeit, 241(4), 263–272.

=== Exhibition catalogues ===
- Bertram, G., & Büttner, N. (Eds.). (2018). Sinnbild / Bildsinn: Rubens als Buchkünstler. Elbingen: Verband Deutscher Antiquare e.V.
- Büttner, N. , & Diefenthaler, S. (Eds.), (2021) Peter Paul Rubens: Becoming Famous. Dresden: Sandstein Verlag.
- Büttner, N., & Orlando, A. (Eds.). (2022). Rubens a Genova. Milan: Electa.
