= Tobias' Journey =

Painting by Joos de Momper

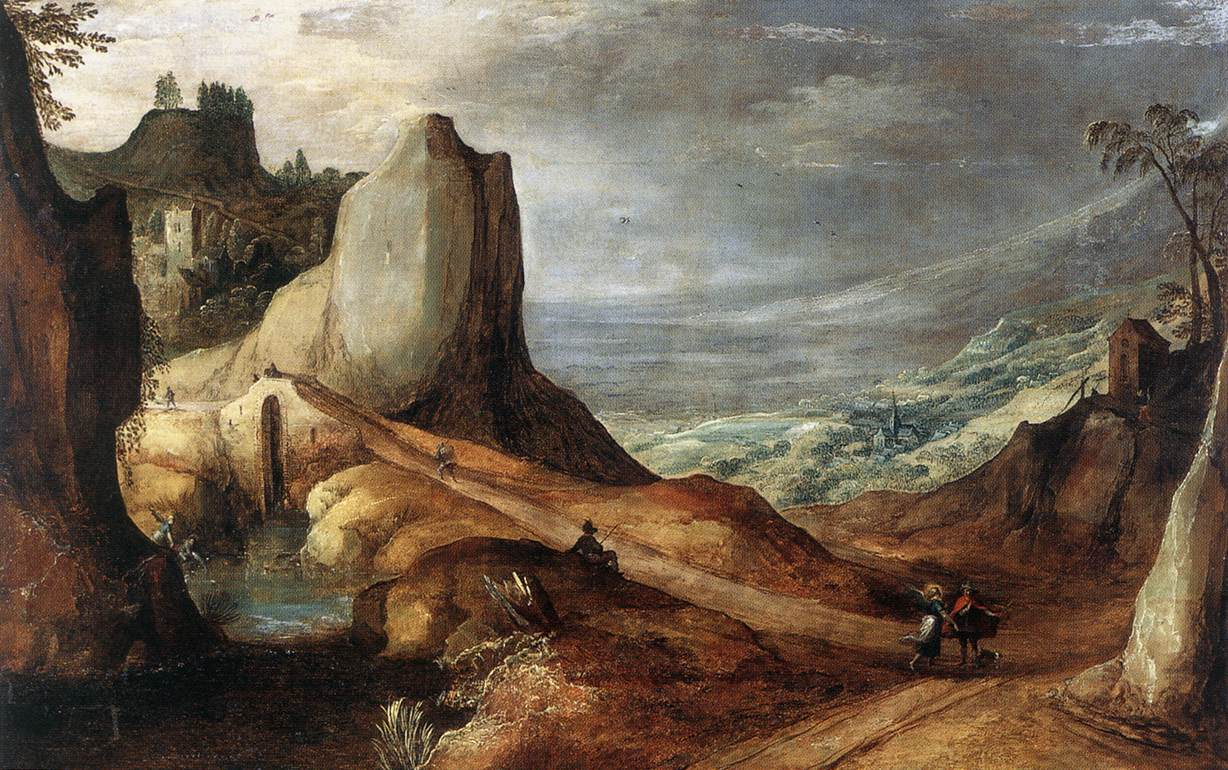
- Artist: Joos de Momper
- Year: 1590s-1600s
- Catalogue: 77.130
- Medium: Oil on panel
- Dimensions: 90 cm × 136 cm (35.4 in × 53.5 in)
- Location: Rockox House; Antwerp

Tobias' Journey is an oil-on-panel painting by Flemish artist Joos de Momper. The painting showcases Momper's large scale, imaginary landscape painting and his interpretation of perspective in distant views while at the same time treating a biblical subject. The painting depicts the story of Tobit, a righteous Israelite of the tribe of Naphtali, living in Nineveh, who is sent to recover is father's money to Media, escorted by the Archangel Raphael. The painting is currently housed at the Rockox House in Antwerp.

== Subject ==
Tobit's son Tobiah is sent by his father to collect money that he has deposited in Media. Raphael presents himself as Tobit's kinsman, Azariah, and offers to aid and protect Tobias. Under Raphael's guidance, Tobias journeys to Media with his dog.

Along the way, while washing his feet in the river Tigris, a fish tries to swallow his foot. By the angel's order, Tobias captures the fish and removes its heart, liver and gall bladder. Upon their arrival in Media, Raphael tells Tobias of the beautiful Sarah, who is plagued by Asmodeus, the daemon of lust. Tobias has the right to marry her because she is his cousin and he her closest relative. The angel instructs the young man to burn the fish's liver and heart to drive away the demon when he attacks on the wedding night. Tobias and Sarah marry, and the fumes of the burning organs drive the daemon to Upper Egypt, where Raphael follows and binds him. Sarah's father had been digging a grave to bury Tobias under the assumption that he would be killed, as the daemon had killed every man Sarah married on their wedding night before the marriages could be consummated. Surprised to find his son-in-law alive and well, Sarah's father orders a double-length wedding feast and has the grave secretly filled. Since the feast prevents him from leaving, Tobias sends Raphael to recover his father's money. After the feast, Tobias and Sarah return to Nineveh. There, Raphael tells the youth to use the fish's gall to cure his father's blindness. Raphael then reveals his identity and returns to heaven, while Tobit sings a hymn of praise.

== Painting ==
Momper owed much to Pieter Bruegel the Elder, as evinced in this painting. Although he journeyed to Italy, de Momepr chose to follow the example of Brueghel, later becoming part of the more imaginative of two groups of landscapists whose style stemmed from Brueghel's oeuvre. De Momper is considered to have made a great contribution to the development of landscape painting in the period between Brueghel and the generation of Rubens. The Flemish landscapists didn't paint en plain air; they relied solely on their memory and imagination to produce fantastic and exotic landscape painting in a relatively flat land such as Flanders.

In the painting, a cliff stands to the left, from whence a path descends into the valley underneath. The path crosses a bridge, overhanging a river flowing into the valley. Gabriel, Tobias and his dog stand close to each other in the foreground, by a curve in the path leading into the dale. Momper was a frequent collaborator of Jan Brueghel the Elder, and he often left the staffage of his painting to fellow artists. Tobias' Journey is likely one of such cases.
