= Hermes (Museo Pio-Clementino) =

Roman marble copy of Praxiteles sculpture

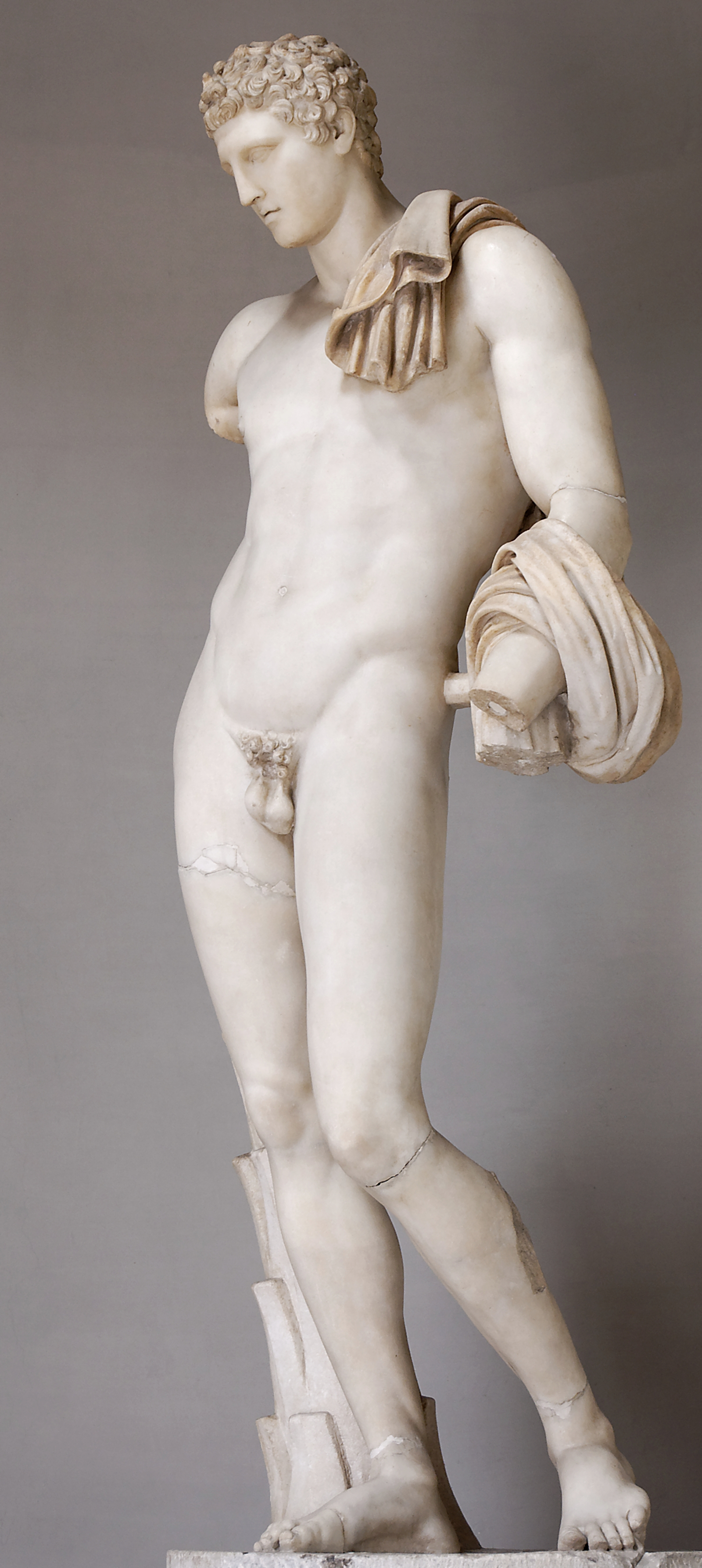
The Hermes, long known as the Belvedere Antinous, in the Vatican's Museo Pio-Clementino.

The Hermes of the Museo Pio-Clementino is an ancient Roman sculpture, part of the Vatican collections, Rome. It was long admired as the Belvedere Antinous, named from its prominent placement in the Cortile del Belvedere. It is now inventory number 907 in the Museo Pio-Clementino.

== Identification ==
Its idealized face is not in fact that of Antinous, the Emperor Hadrian's beloved. The cloak known as a chlamys, thrown over the left shoulder and wrapped round the left forearm, and the relaxed contrapposto identify the sculpture as a Hermes, one of a familiar Praxitelean type. Today the sculpture is considered (in the most recent Helbig) to be a Hadrianic copy (early second century AD) of a bronze by Praxiteles or one of his school.

== Description ==
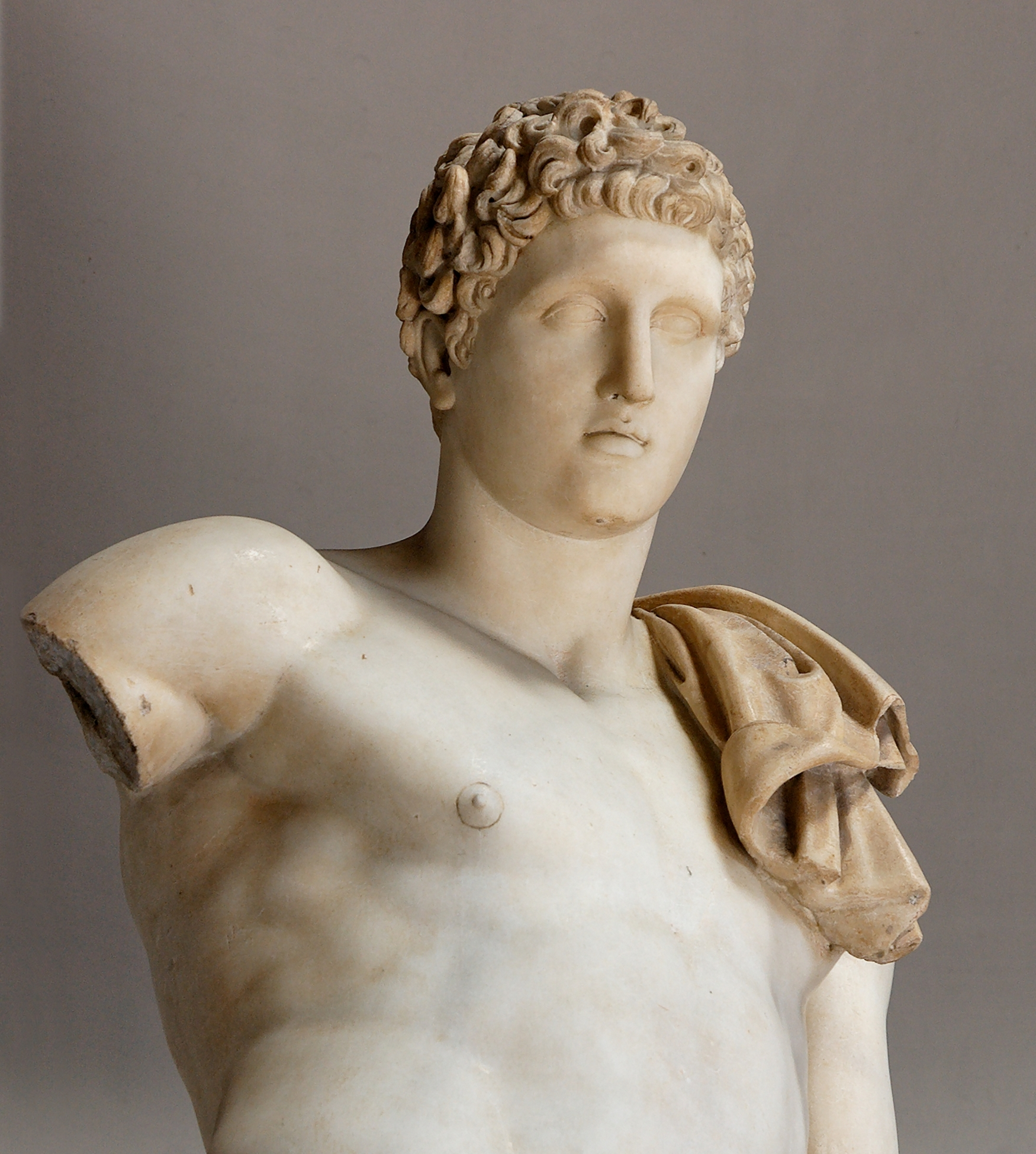
3/4 left view of the head

At 1.95 m (6 ft 5 in) tall, the statue shows a nude young man with a chlamys on his shoulder and left forearm. It is a variant of the Andros type; the Andros example has the chlamys and a serpent twined round the tree-support, with the tree and serpent allowing its definite identification as Hermes as psychopompus; it is directly influenced by the Hermes and the Infant Dionysus of Praxiteles.

== History ==
The sculpture was bought for Pope Paul III in 1543, when a thousand ducats were paid to "Nicolaus de Palis for a very beautiful marble statue... which His Holiness has sent to be placed in the Belvedere garden". The most likely site for its discovery is in a garden near Castel Sant'Angelo, where the Palis had property.

The statue was immediately famous, as the Antinous Admirandus: it was mentioned in all the accounts of the antiquities to be seen in Rome, engraved in all the repertories of classical art, universally admired and copied in bronze and marble for Fontainebleau in the sixteenth century and Versailles in the seventeenth century. A bronze copy by Hubert Le Sueur figured in the collections of Charles I of England before being acquired by Oliver Cromwell, while another cast by the Keller brothers came into the collection of Louis XIV of France. A marble copy was bought by Peter the Great and casts can also be found in art academies such as those of Milan and Berlin.

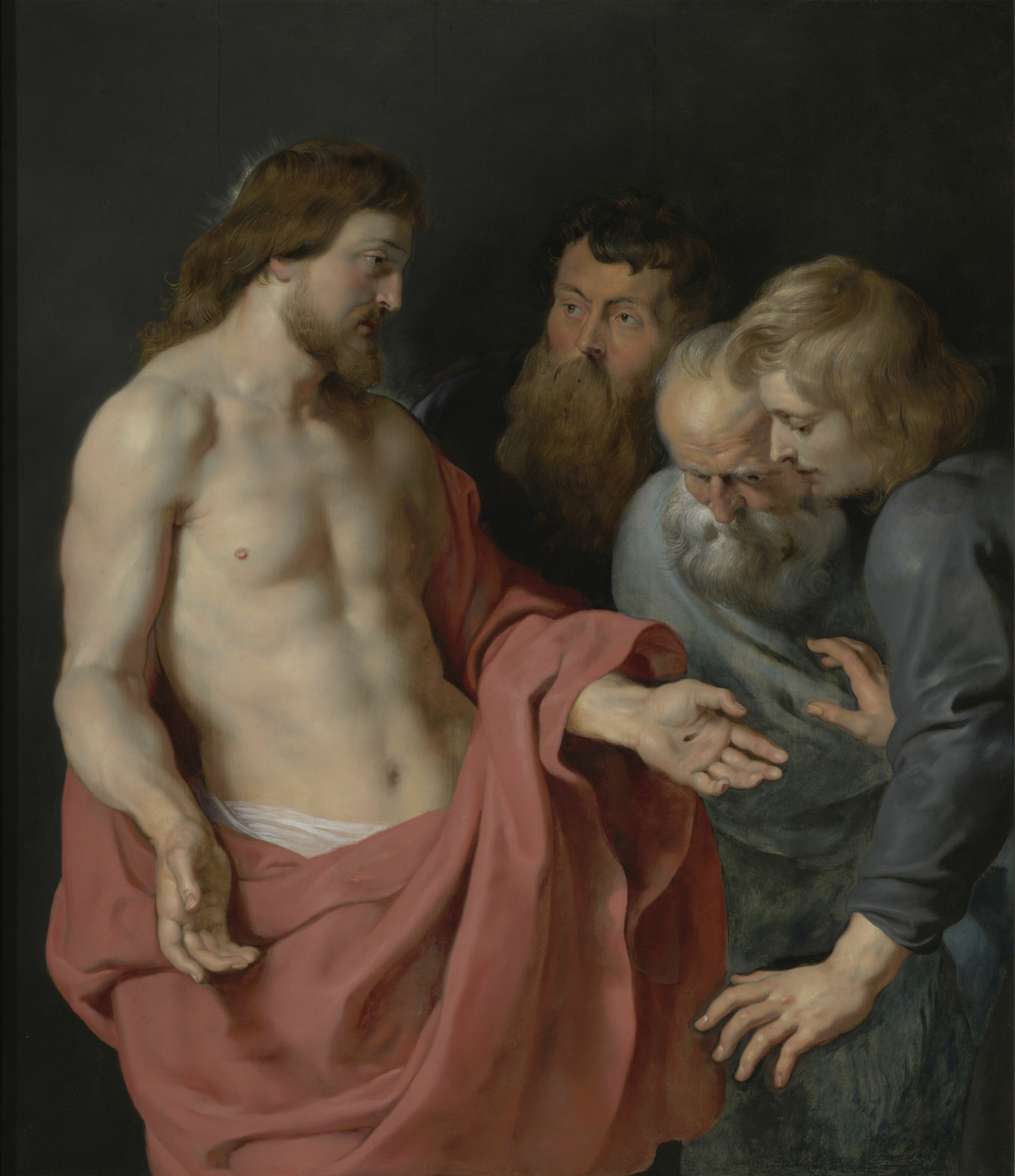
Rubens' Christ's First Apparition to the Disciples (central panel of the Rockox Triptych)

Peter Paul Rubens studied the sculpture during his stay in Rome in the early 17th century and praised its beauty and proportions. The statue likely inspired him for the figure of Christ in the central panel of The Rockox Triptych painted in 1615. Poussin saw in it a canon of ideal proportions and in 1683, Gérard Audran included it in his collection of engravings representing the Proportions of the human body measured from the most beautiful statues of antiquity, meant for young sculptors. Winckelmann recognised it as a statue "of the first class" and much admired the head, "undoubtedly one of the most beautiful heads of a young man from Antiquity", even though he criticised the working of its feet, stomach and legs In Winckelmann's time the statue's identification as Antinous had already been disproved, and the statue was interpreted instead as a Meleager, hero of the hunt for the Calydonian Boar. It was finally identified as Hermes by the scholar Ennio Quirino Visconti, in his catalogue of the Museo Pio-Clementino (1818–1822).

== Sources ==
- Brummer, Hans Henrik, 1970. The Statue Court in the Vatican Belvedere (Stockholm).
- Haskell, Francis, and Nicholas Penny, 1981. Taste and the Antique: the Lure of Classical Sculpture 1500-1900 (Yale University Press), cat. no. 4, pp 141–43.
- Helbig, Wolfgang, 1963–72. Führer durch die öffentlichen Sammlungen der klassistischer Altertümer in Rom, (Tübingen) 4th ed., I, pp 190–91.
