= Snijders&Rockox House =

Museum in Antwerp, Belgium

Coordinates: 51.2217°N 4.4061°E

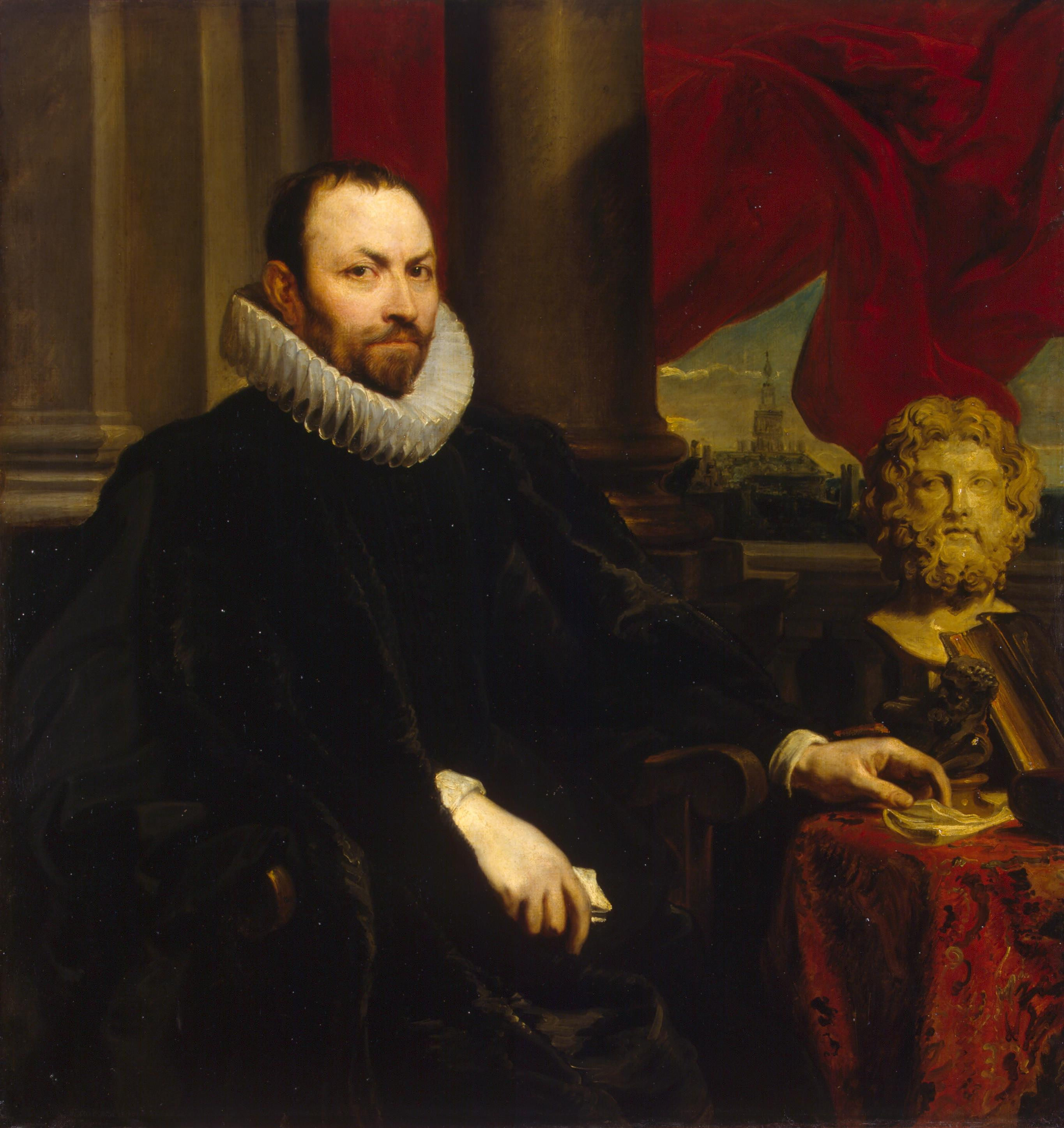
Portrait of Sir Nicolaas II Rockox, painted by Anthony van Dyck

The Snijders&Rockox House (Dutch: Snijders&Rockoxhuis) is a museum in Antwerp, Belgium. It is located in two neighbouring townhouses formerly owned by the artist Frans Snyders (1579–1657) and the mayor Nicolaas Rockox (1560–1640). It is owned by KBC Bank and showcases a collection of 16th and 17th century Flemish art.

== History ==
The house was rebuilt for Nicolaas II Rockox, Lord Mayor of Antwerp. He had different houses united in 1603, and restored in Renaissance style. It was his principal residence which he used for business and it was built in baroque style. A few of Rubens' most famous artworks were specially designed for this residence, among them Samson and Delilah.

The Rockox family sold the estate in 1715 to benefit the poor. The house became property of the KBC Bank in 1970 and it is now used as a public museum.

== Architecture ==
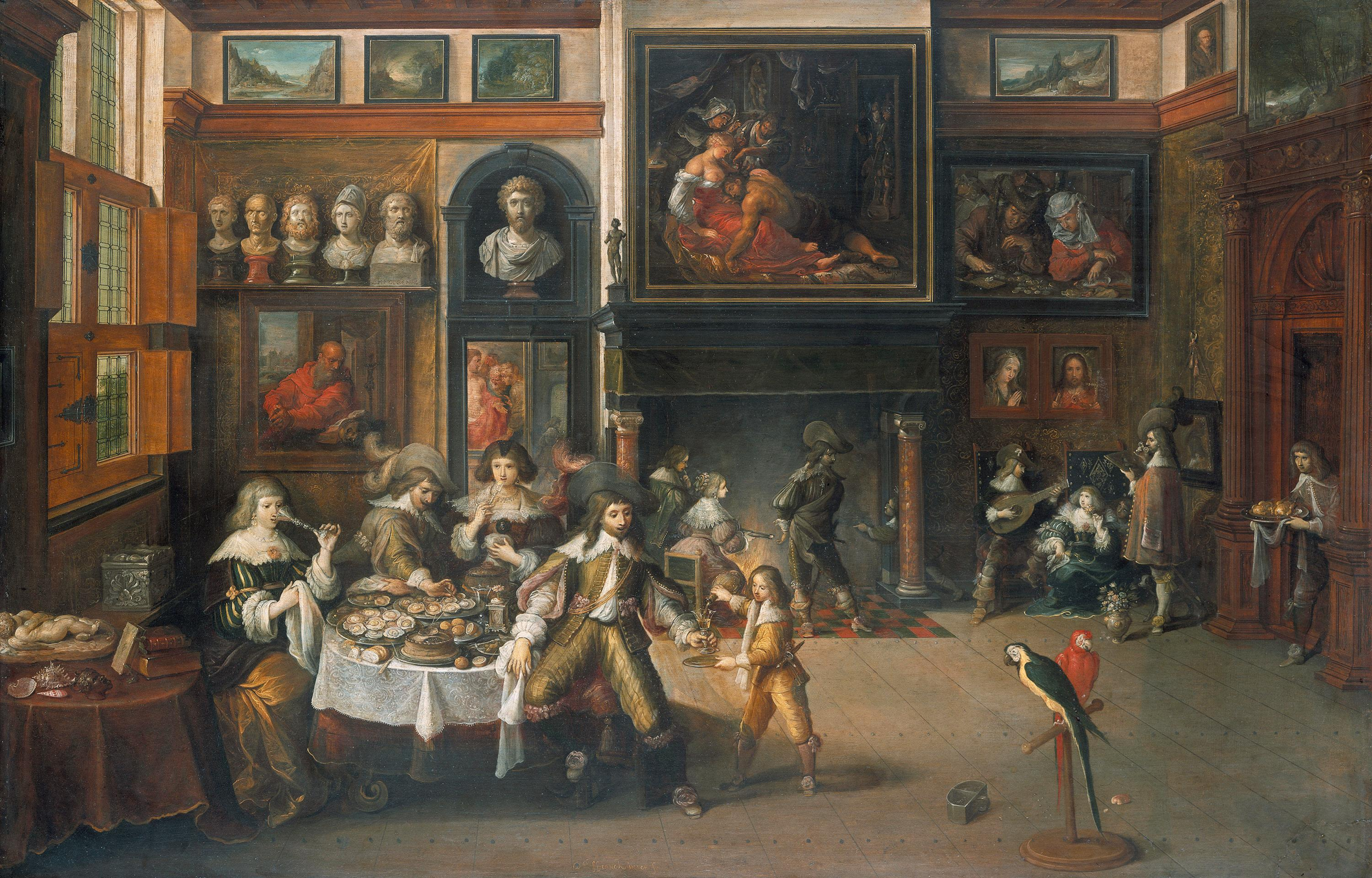
Supper at the House of Mayor Rockox by Frans Francken the Younger

The house is a typical example of the architecture that was popular with the bourgeoisie of the early 17th century in Antwerp. It has an inner garden with fine herbs, and has features of an Italian pallazo.

== Collection ==
The current rooms are ornated with the Old Master collection of KBC Bank. This collection is put permanently on display, like the paintings would be presented in the 17th century. However, this collection is not the historic collection as owned by the Rockox family. Besides paintings the current KBC collection includes important engravings, sculptures and textiles.

Artists whose works are on display include Jan Fyt, Cornelis Massijs, Peter Paul Rubens, Jan Sanders van Hemessen, Hans III Jordaens, Jacob Jordaens, Maerten de Vos, David Teniers, Quentin Matsys, Joachim Patinir, Frans Snyders, Lucas Faydherbe, Paulus Pontius and Lambert Lombard. From October 2026 - January 2027, Snijders&Rockox House will show the first ever exhibition of Catharina van Hemessen's collected works.

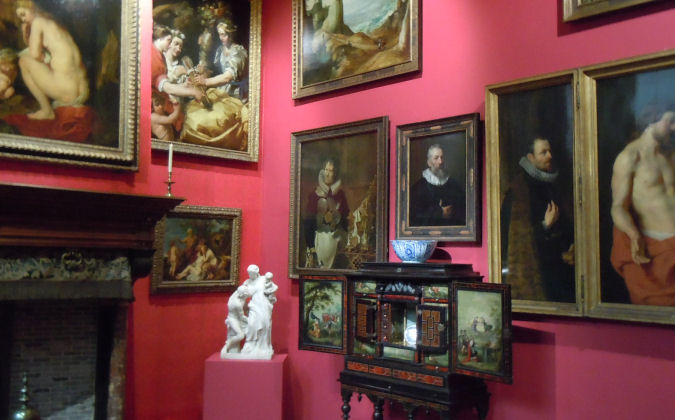
Interior, on the right Rubens' The Rockox Triptych

== See also ==
- Rubens House
