= Art Recognition =

Technology company headquartered in Adliswil, Switzerland

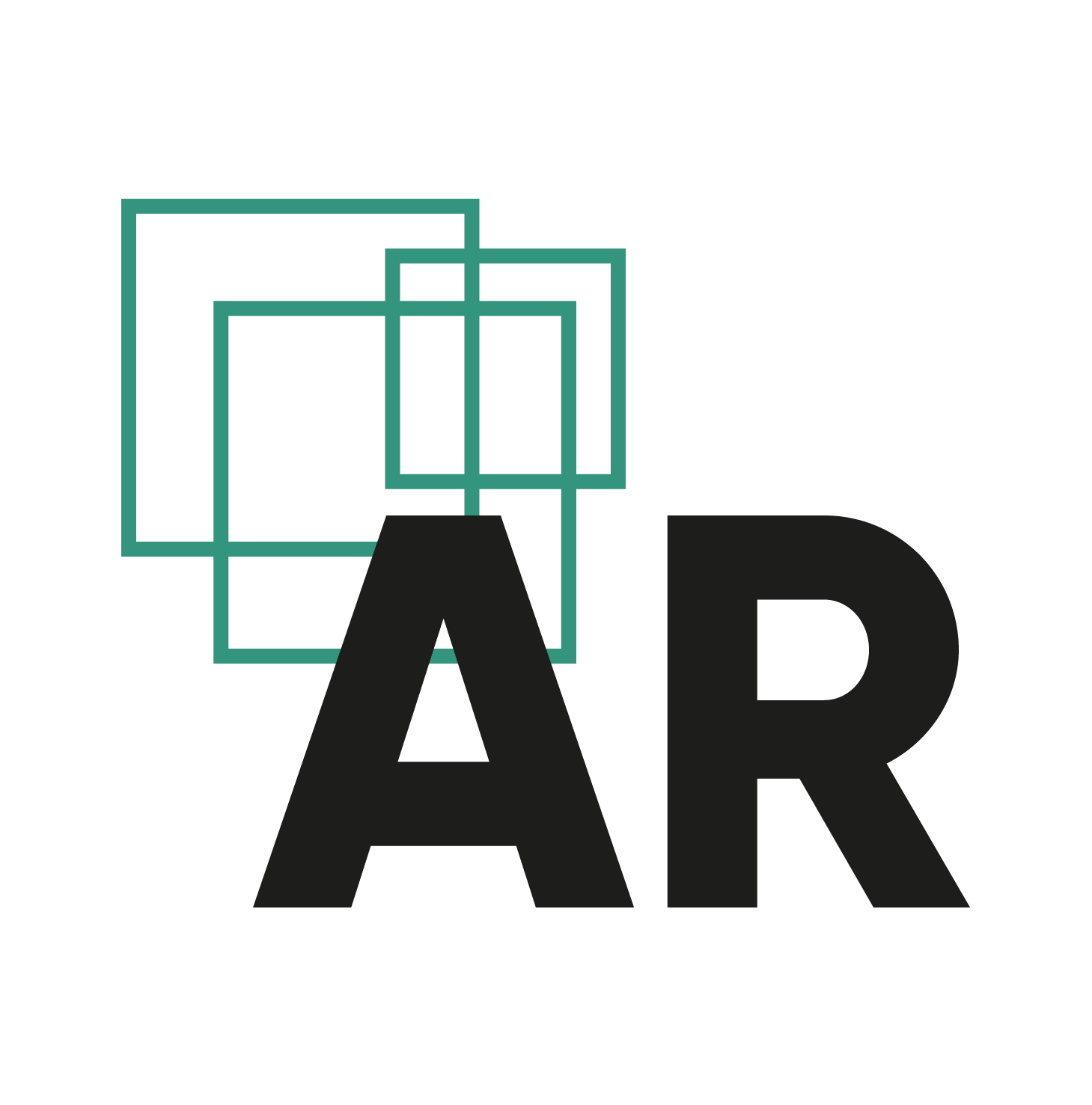
- Type: Private
- Industry: Artificial Intelligence, Art Authentication
- Founded: 2019
- Founders: Dr. Carina Popovici, Christiane Hoppe-Oehl
- Area served: Worldwide
- Products: AI-based art authentication Art forgery detection reports
- Website: art-recognition.com

Art Recognition is a Swiss technology company headquartered in Adliswil, within the Zurich metropolitan area, Switzerland. Art Recognition specializes in the application of artificial intelligence (AI) for art authentication and the detection of art forgeries.

== Overview ==
Art Recognition was established in 2019 by Dr. Carina Popovici and Christiane Hoppe-Oehl.

Art Recognition employs a combination of machine learning techniques, computer vision algorithms, and deep neural networks to assess the authenticity of artworks.

The company's technology undergoes a process of data collection, dataset preparation, and training.

=== Academic partnerships and grants ===
Art Recognition has established a relationship with Innosuisse, a Swiss innovation agency, to expand its research and development initiatives.

It has also formed a strategic collaboration with Nils Büttner, an art historian and professor at the State Academy of Fine Arts Stuttgart (ABK Stuttgart).

=== Notable developments ===
In May 2024, Art Recognition played a key role in identifying counterfeit artworks, including alleged Monets and Renoirs, being sold on eBay.

Germann Auction in November 2024 became the first auction house to successfully conduct a sale of artwork authenticated entirely by artificial intelligence.

As of January 2025, Art Recognition has appointed art crime expert and Pulitzer Prize finalist Noah Charney as an advisor.

=== Recognition and debates ===
The company was featured on the front page of The Wall Street Journal for its involvement in the authentication case of the Flaget Madonna, believed to have been partly painted by Raphael.

A broadcast by the Swiss public television SRF covered how the algorithm can be used to detect art forgeries with high accuracy.

The technology developed by Art Recognition has been recognized for its role in providing a technology-based art authentication solution, compared to traditional methods.

== Controversial cases ==
Art Recognition's AI algorithm has been applied to several high-profile and controversial artworks, sparking significant interest and debate in the art world.

1. Samson and Delilah at the National Gallery in London: The National Gallery's "Samson and Delilah", traditionally attributed to the artist Rubens, has also been examined using Art Recognition's AI, which has assessed the painting as non-authentic.
2. De Brecy Tondo Madonna. A research team from Bradford University and the University of Nottingham initially attributed the painting to Raphael, employing an AI face recognition software, while the AI developed at Art Recognition returned a negative result. The Bradford group's AI was trained on 49 images, whereas Art Recognition employed a larger dataset of over 100 images.
3. Lucian Freud Painting Controversy: Featured in The New Yorker, a painting attributed to Lucian Freud became a subject of dispute. Art Recognition's AI analysis played a big role in examining the painting's authenticity.
4. Titian at Kunsthaus Zürich: A painting attributed to Titian, housed at Kunsthaus Zürich, has been a topic of debate among art experts. The application of Art Recognition's technology offered a new perspective. Following this debate, Kunsthaus Zürich has announced plans to initiate a comprehensive project aimed at resolving the authenticity questions surrounding the painting.
5. Art Recognition has contributed to the authentication debate surrounding The Polish Rider, a painting traditionally attributed to Rembrandt but subject to scholarly debate.
