= Samson and Delilah (Rubens) =

Painting by Peter Paul Rubens

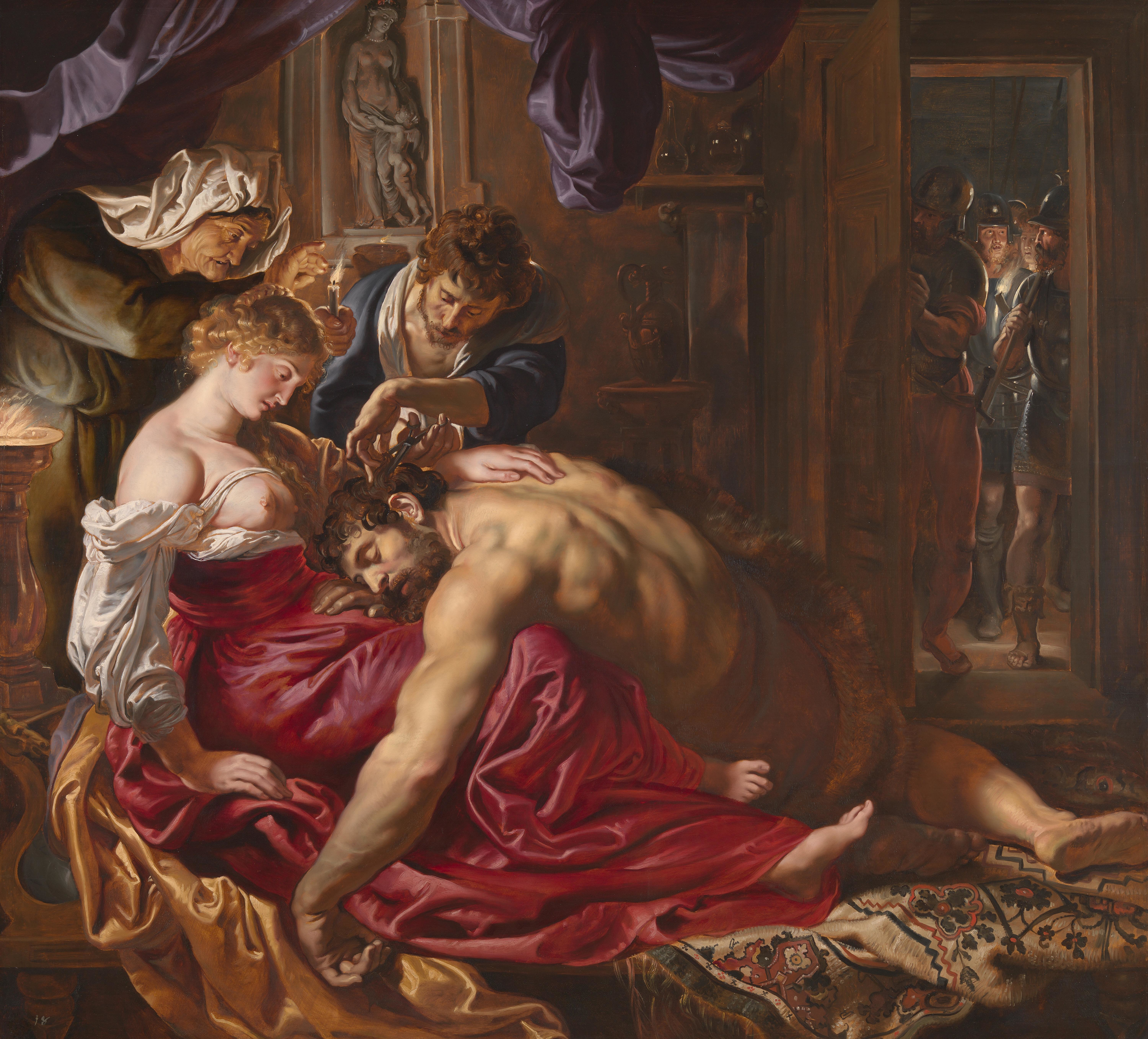
- Artist: Peter Paul Rubens
- Year: c. 1609–1610
- Type: Oil on wood
- Dimensions: 185 cm × 205 cm (73 in × 81 in)
- Location: National Gallery, London

Samson and Delilah is a painting long attributed to the Flemish Baroque artist Peter Paul Rubens (1577–1640) in the National Gallery, London. It dates from about 1609 to 1610.

Two preliminary copies of the painting exist today: an ink-and-wash drawing on paper, and an oil sketch on wood panel. The oil sketch is in the Cincinnati Art Museum, while the ink sketch is held by a private collection in Amsterdam.

Samson and Delilah (sketch)
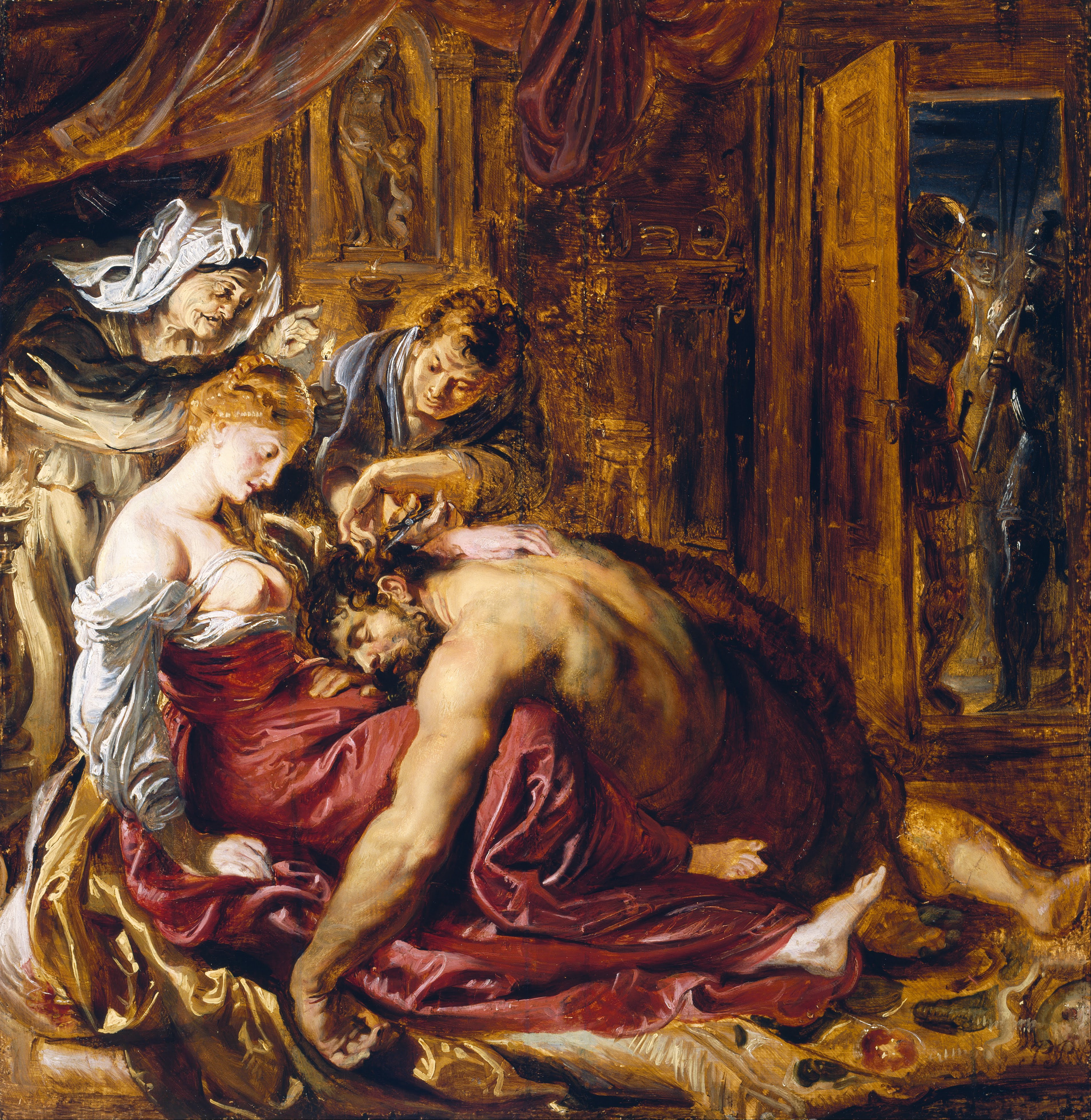
- Artist: Peter Paul Rubens
- Year: c. 1609
- Medium: Oil on panel
- Dimensions: 52.1 cm × 50.5 cm (20.5 in × 19.9 in)
- Location: Cincinnati Art Museum, Cincinnati

== Description ==
Rubens depicts the moment when, Samson having fallen asleep on Delilah's lap, a young man cuts Samson's hair. Samson and Delilah are in a dark room, which is lit mostly by a candle held by an old woman to Delilah's left. Delilah is shown fully dressed, but with her breasts exposed. Her left hand is on top of Samson's right shoulder, as his left arm is draped over her legs. The man snipping Samson's hair is crossing his hands, which is a sign of betrayal. Philistine soldiers can be seen in the right-hand background of the painting. The niche behind Delilah contains a statue of Venus, the goddess of love, and her son, Cupid. Notably, Cupid's mouth is bound, rather than his eyes. This statue can be taken to represent the cause of Samson's fate and the tool of Delilah's actions.

The painting depicts an episode from the Old Testament story of Samson and Delilah (Judges 16). Samson was a Hebrew hero known for fighting the Philistines. Having fallen in love with Delilah, who has been bribed by the Philistines, Samson tells her the secret of his great strength: his uncut hair. Without his strength, Samson is captured by the Philistines. The old woman standing behind Delilah, providing further light for the scene, does not appear in the biblical narrative of Samson and Delilah. She is believed to be a procuress, and the adjacent profiles of her and Delilah may symbolise the old woman's past, and Delilah's future.

== Provenance ==
The painting was originally commissioned by Nicolaas II Rockox, lord mayor of Antwerp, for Rockox House in that city. In addition to being a patron, Rockox was a close personal friend of Rubens. The painting was specifically intended to be placed above a 7-foot mantelshelf, where the painting would have been seen from below. The painting was publicly sold for charity when Rockox died in 1640, but the purchaser's identity is unknown. In 1700, a panel titled Samson and Delilah was bought by Hans-Adam I, Prince of Liechtenstein. This is likely to have been Rubens's painting. However, when the panel was part of the Liechtenstein Collection in Vienna in the eighteenth century, the painter was identified as Jan van den Hoecke, who was a principal assistant of Rubens in the 1630s. The painting was then sold in 1880 in Paris, where it was later discovered by Ludwig Burchard in 1929. Eventually, it was sold at auction in 1980 at Christie's, purchased by the National Gallery for US$5 million.

The painting was earlier attributed to the Dutch painter Gerard van Honthorst, a painter who, like Rubens, worked in Rome in the shadow of Caravaggio at the start of the 17th century.

There has been some doubt cast over the attribution of the painting to Rubens, led by Euphrosyne Doxiadis, an artist and scholar of the Fayum mummy portraits. She argues that the National Gallery's painting varies in details from copies of the original made during Rubens's lifetime, that it does not employ the layering technique of glazing common in oil painting at the time and mastered by Rubens, and that its provenance cannot be documented with certainty between 1641 and 1929. A dendrochronological examination of the painting however, confirms that the painting dates to the correct period, and the attribution has been accepted by a majority of the art-historical scholarly community.

In September 2021 however, an artificial intelligence analysis conducted by Dr Carina Popovici and Art Recognition, a Swiss company based near Zurich, seemed to confirm doubters' beliefs when it was announced there is a 91% probability that the painting was not the work of Rubens.

== Painting materials ==
The painting was cleaned and investigated in the National Gallery in 1983. It is noteworthy for the masterful and elaborate painting of the draperies and for the absence of blue pigments. Rubens employed carmine (kermes) lake, lead-tin-yellow, vermilion and ochres in addition to lead white and charcoal black. Chemical pigment analysis however, was still in its early stages at that time, and not enough samples for other works by Rubens were available compared to what is available today.

== Derivative works ==
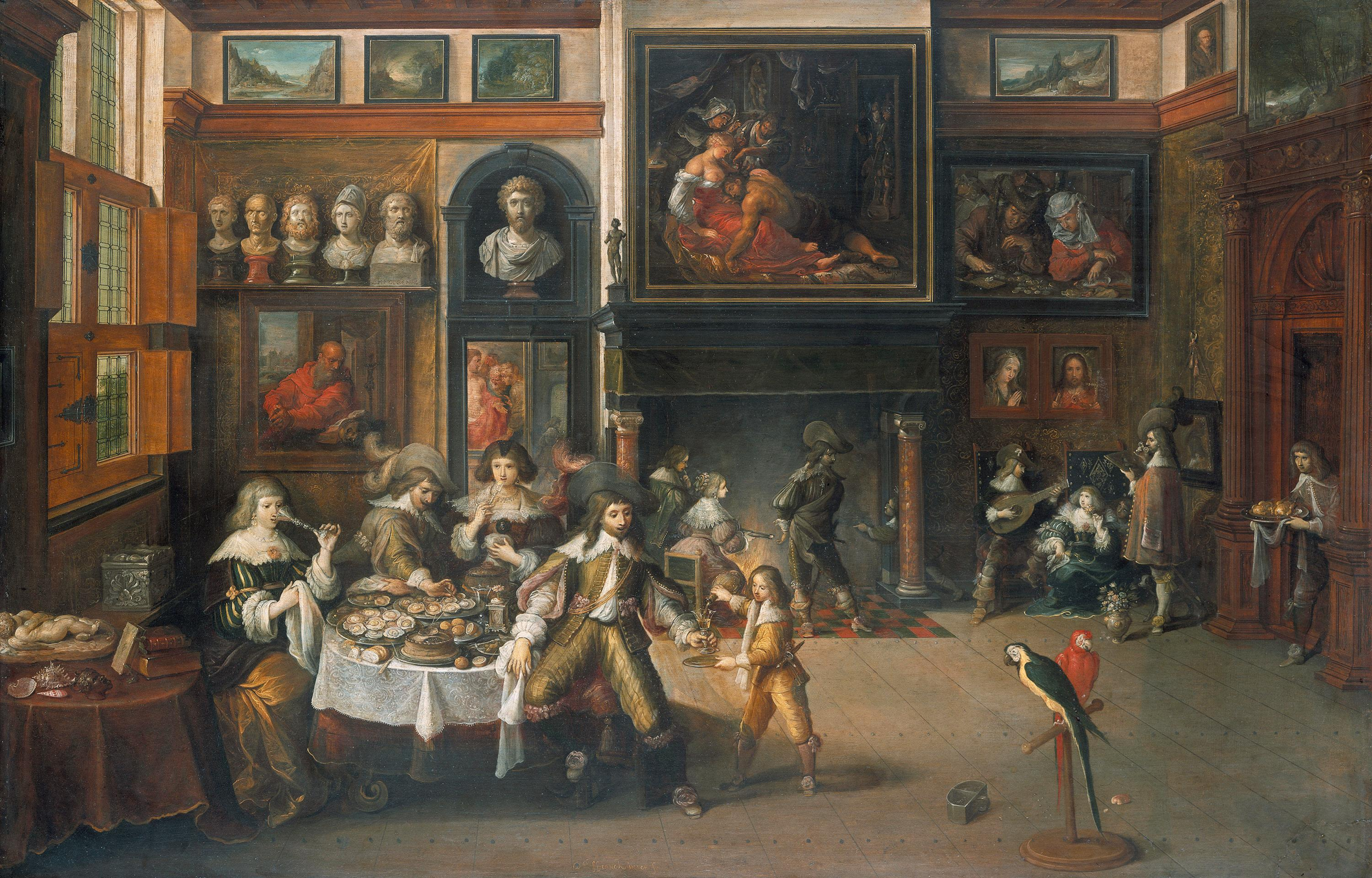
Samson and Delilah by Rubens can be seen hanging above the mantelpiece in Frans Francken's Banquet at the House of Burgomaster Rockox (between 1630 and 1635).

Jacob Matham, a Haarlem printmaker, used the Cincinnati oil sketch of Samson and Delilah as a modello for an engraving he made c. 1613. The engraving is a reverse image of Samson and Delilah.

The painting of Samson and Delilah can be seen in Frans Francken the Younger's painting Banquet at the House of Burgomaster Rockox, where the painting is hanging above the mantelpiece. Notably, this 17th-century depiction of the original Rubens painting shows Samson's foot included wholly within the frame of the composition. Compared to it the National Gallery's version is cropped on both left and right sides. Also, there are five soldiers in the doorway compared to three in Francken's picture and in early engravings.

== See also ==
- ArtWatch International § Ludwig Burchard
