= The Rockox Triptych =

Triptych by Peter Paul Rubens

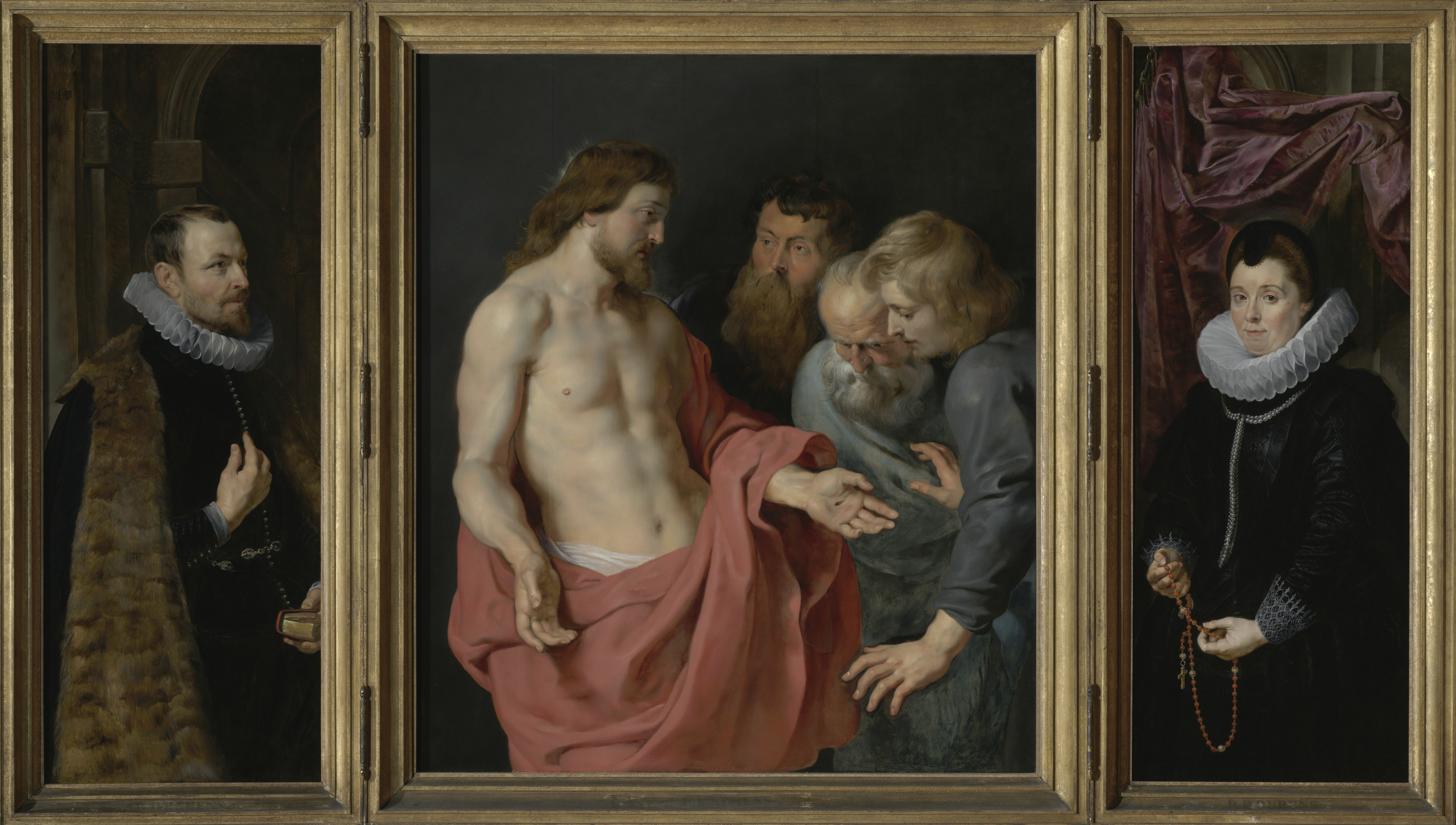
- Artist: Peter Paul Rubens
- Year: 1613–1615
- Type: Oil on panel
- Dimensions: 146 cm × 233 cm (57 in × 92 in)
- Location: Royal Museum of Fine Arts Antwerp, Antwerp, Belgium

The Rockox Triptych or Epitaph of Nicolaas Rockox and His Wife Adriana Perez is a triptych painted by the Flemish painter Peter Paul Rubens between 1613 and 1615. It is in the collection of the Royal Museum of Fine Arts Antwerp.

== History ==
The triptych was commissioned around 1613 by Nicolaas Rockox (1560–1640) and his spouse Adriana Perez (1568–1619) for their funerary monument in the Recollects church in Antwerp. Rockox was a mayor of Antwerp and a close personal friend and important patron of Rubens. Adriana Perez was the granddaughter of Spanish conversos who had arrived in Antwerp during the early sixteenth century.

The work is dated in the upper left corner of the left panel. The year was changed from '1613' to '1615', presumably because Rubens started the painting in 1613, but only finished it in 1615 and then hung in the Lady Chapel behind the choir in the Recollects church in Antwerp. In any case, the epitaph was commissioned before the death of the patrons. It often happened that funerary monuments were completed before – or vice versa: only some time after – a death.

The triptych was confiscated by the French invaders in 1794 for the Louvre in Paris. In 1815 the composition was returned to Antwerp and transferred to the newly established museum in Antwerp.

== Description ==
The outer panels contain portraits of Rockox and his wife holding attributes of their faith: a bible and a rosary. The outer panels depict the coats of arms of the two families of the patrons.

Outer panels depicting the coats of arms of the patrons' families

The central panel was traditionally believed to show the disbelief (or incredulity) of Thomas, the story in the Gospel of John of how the Apostle Thomas refused to believe the resurrected Jesus had appeared to the other apostles until he could see and touch Jesus' crucifixion wounds on his side. This interpretation of the scene was supported by the similarity of Rubens' composition to Caravaggio's treatment of the Thomas story, which shows Thomas bending over and inserting his finger into Jesus's side wound with a look of incredulity with two men behind him intently observing the scene.

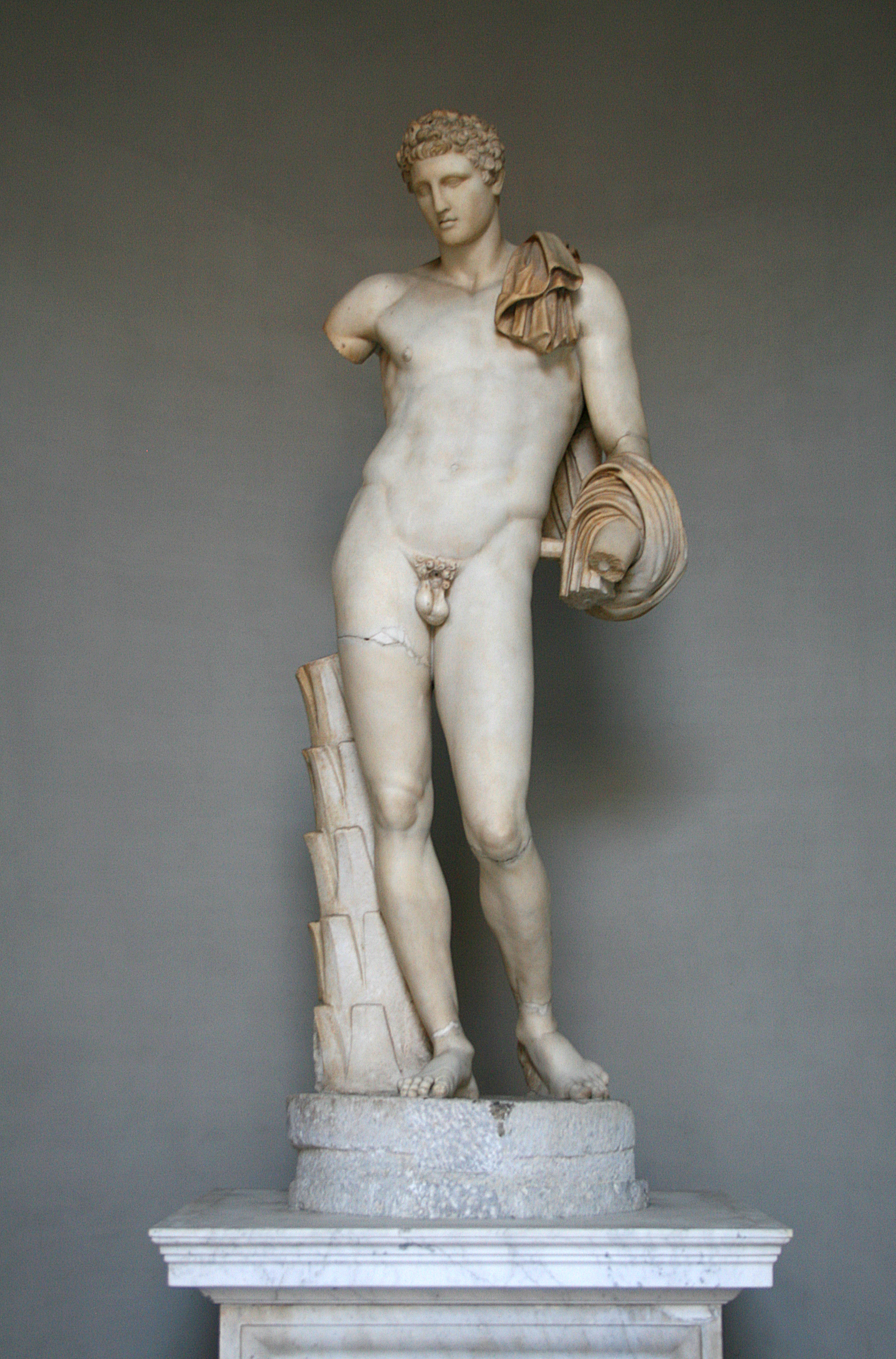
Hermes Belvedere

Recent scholarship has argued that Rubens did not depict the disbelief of Apostle Thomas but rather the scene of Christ's first appearance to the apostles in Jerusalem as described in the Gospel of Luke 24:36-51. In this story the 11 surviving Apostles initially refused to believe that the person appearing in their midst was the resurrected Jesus. Confronted with this disbelief Christ showed them the Crucifixion wounds on his hands and feet and encouraged them to handle the wounds and see the evidence for themselves. According to Luke, the disciples never took up this invitation to inspect the physical evidence of Christ's death. Only after Christ consumed a meal of broiled fish and a honeycomb did the disciples accept that the person was the resurrected Christ.

The incredulity of Thomas by Caravaggio

An argument for the Rubens composition depicting the scene in Luke rather than the story of the doubting Thomas is that Rubens has intentionally omitted the wound on Christ's side while Caravaggio's Saint Thomas is totally focused on Thomas' finger probing Christ's side wound. Rubens' omission of the side wound suggests that he intended to strictly follow the text of Luke, which only mentions the wounds on Christ's hands and feet and not the side wound. By this act he also highlighted the contradictions between the various Gospel accounts of the Resurrection. This reflects the skepticism prevalent among the Antwerp elite as to the ability to achieve certainty, in particular as regards religious issues. It has further been argued that this omission was intended by Rubens to highlight the need for true believers (such as the patrons themselves) to make a leap of faith when accepting the truth of the Resurrection of Christ rather than to seek corroboration in physical evidence.

For the depiction of the body of Christ, Rubens was likely inspired by the famous Antique sculpture of the Hermes Belvedere, which he had studied and whose beauty and proportions he had praised during his stay in Rome.
