= Nicolaas Rockox =

Flemish politician, mayor of Antwerp (1560–1640)

Nicolaas Rockox knight
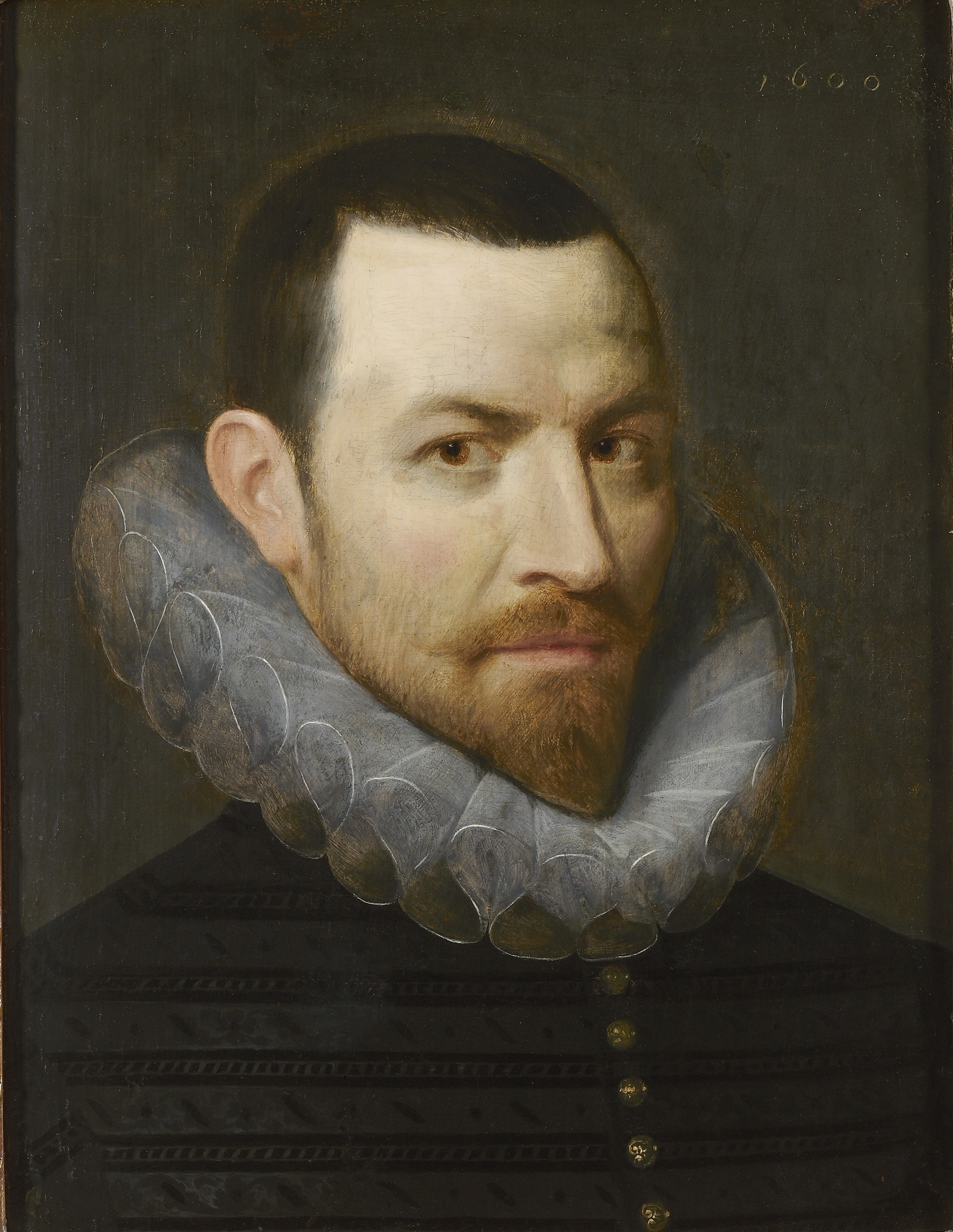
- Nicolaas Rockox, painted by Otto van Veen.

Mayor of Antwerp
- Monarch: Philip II of Spain

Personal details
- Born: 14 December 1560 Antwerp
- Died: 12 December 1640 (aged 79) Antwerp
- Spouse: Adriana Perez (1568–1619)

Nicolaas Rockox (1560–1640), was an art patron and collector, numismatist, humanist, philanthropist and mayor of Antwerp. He was a close personal friend and important patron of Peter Paul Rubens. His residence in Antwerp was a centre where Antwerp's humanists and artists congregated and housed a large collection of artworks, antiques, rare objects and coins. It is now a museum known as the Snijders&Rockox House. He was knighted by Archduke Albert and Isabella, the Governor General of the Habsburg Netherlands.

== Early life ==
Nicolaas Rockox was born in de Keizerstraat in Antwerp as the oldest son of Adriaan II and Isabella van Olmen. His parents were both scions of prominent families. Rockox was a nephew of John III van de Werve, Lord of Hovorst and a first cousin of Lancelot II of Ursel, mayor of Antwerp. After his father died when Nicolaas was only 10, his mother and other family members ensured that he and his two younger brothers received an advanced education. After schooling in Antwerp, he studied at the universities of Leuven and Paris. He finished his studies at the University of Douai where he graduated in law on 24 August 1584.

== Career ==
Upon his return to Antwerp he became a member of the local schutterij, the civic guard of Antwerp which was tasked with maintaining the peace in the city as well as defending it from external attack. At the time, Antwerp had a Calvinist administration under the leadership of the mayor Philips of Marnix, Lord of Saint-Aldegonde and was in open revolt against the Catholic Spanish rulers of the Habsburg Netherlands. When the city was besieged by troops under Alexander Farnese, Duke of Parma Antwerp in 1584, Rockox assisted in the city's defence.

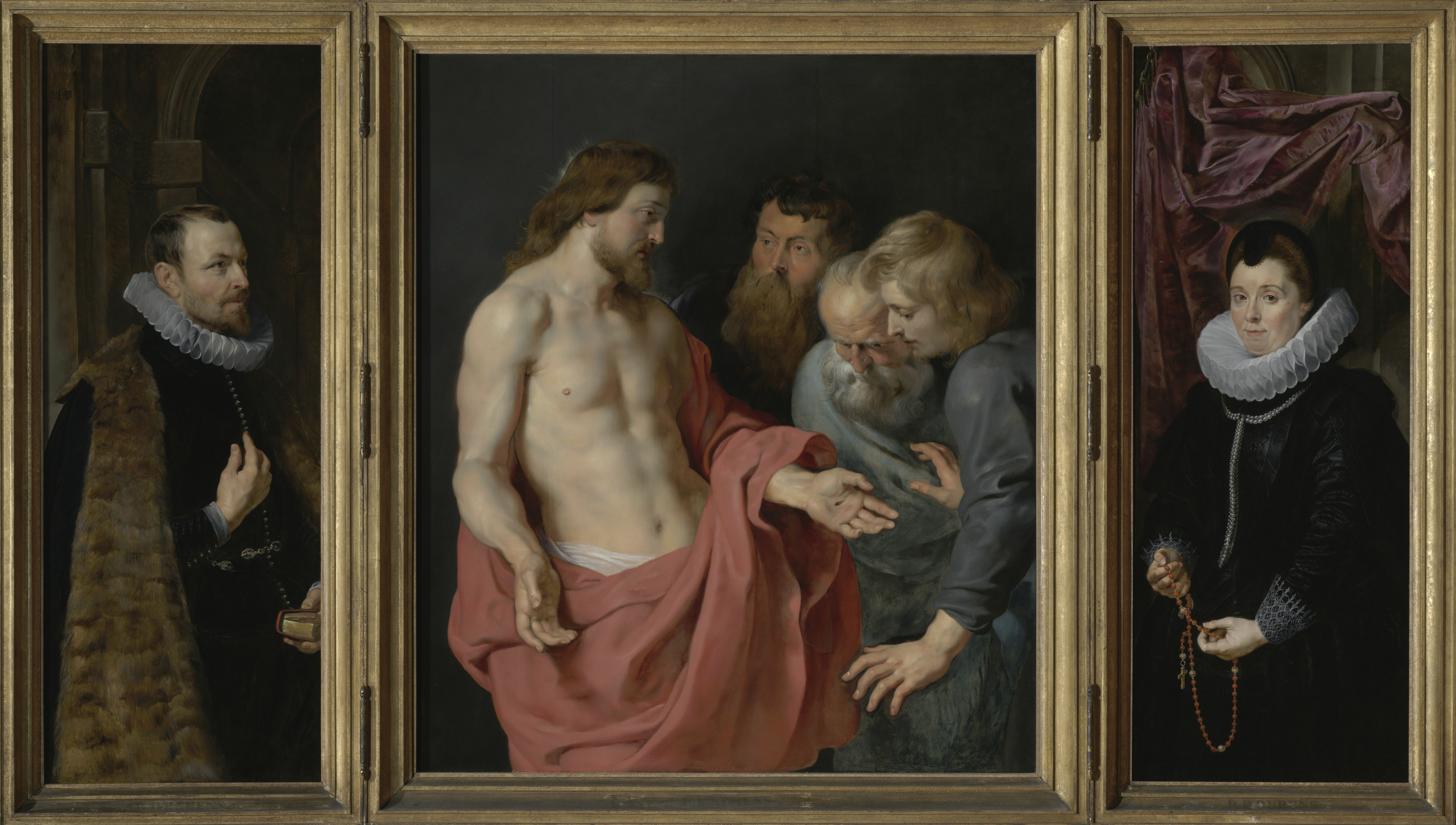
The Rockox Triptych by Rubens with portraits of Rockox and his wife

After the fall of Antwerp on 17 August 1585 he did not join the exodus of citizens who left the city. In 1588 he served for the first time as alderman of Antwerp. On 5 September 1589 he married Adriana Perez (1568–1619) in the Cathedral. His wife was a neighbor in the Keizerstraat and the daughter of the wealthy merchant and banker Luis Perez (1532–1601) and Maria van Berchem. Her parental grandparents were Spanish conversos who had arrived in Antwerp during the early sixteenth century. The couple would remain childless.

In 1590, he was knighted by the Archdukes Albert and Isabella. He was put on the list of honours when their Joyous Entry took place.

Coat of arms

In 1603 Rockox bought the house named Gulden Rinck in the Keizersstraat and developed it into his main residence. It is now the Snijders&Rockox House museum. It housed an important collection of art and of curiosities, famous in his own time. His collection included a Samson and Delilah painted for him by his friend Rubens. After 1608 the friendship between them was very close. Rockox commissioned several paintings from him, including The Rockox Triptych. Other friends of Rockox included Abraham Ortelius, who taught him the art of numismatics, and the young Anthony van Dyck, who painted several portraits for him.

Rockox served several terms as mayor of Antwerp. He held other important posts including Justice of the Peace, guild master of the Cloth Hall, head of the Arquebusiers’ Guild, chief treasurer and head of the civic guard. He died in the Gulden Rinck and was buried in the church of the Recollect convent, where he had a private chapel built for his deceased wife in 1619. Because he had no children, his property was given to the poor, in devotion.

During his life Rockox spent an important part of his private fortune to benefit the poor. He commanded that a public reserve of grain be prepared for the poor in case of war or siege. He paid 45,300 florins for this from his private fortune. After his death his famous collection of artworks spread to other collections worldwide.

== Patronage and collection ==
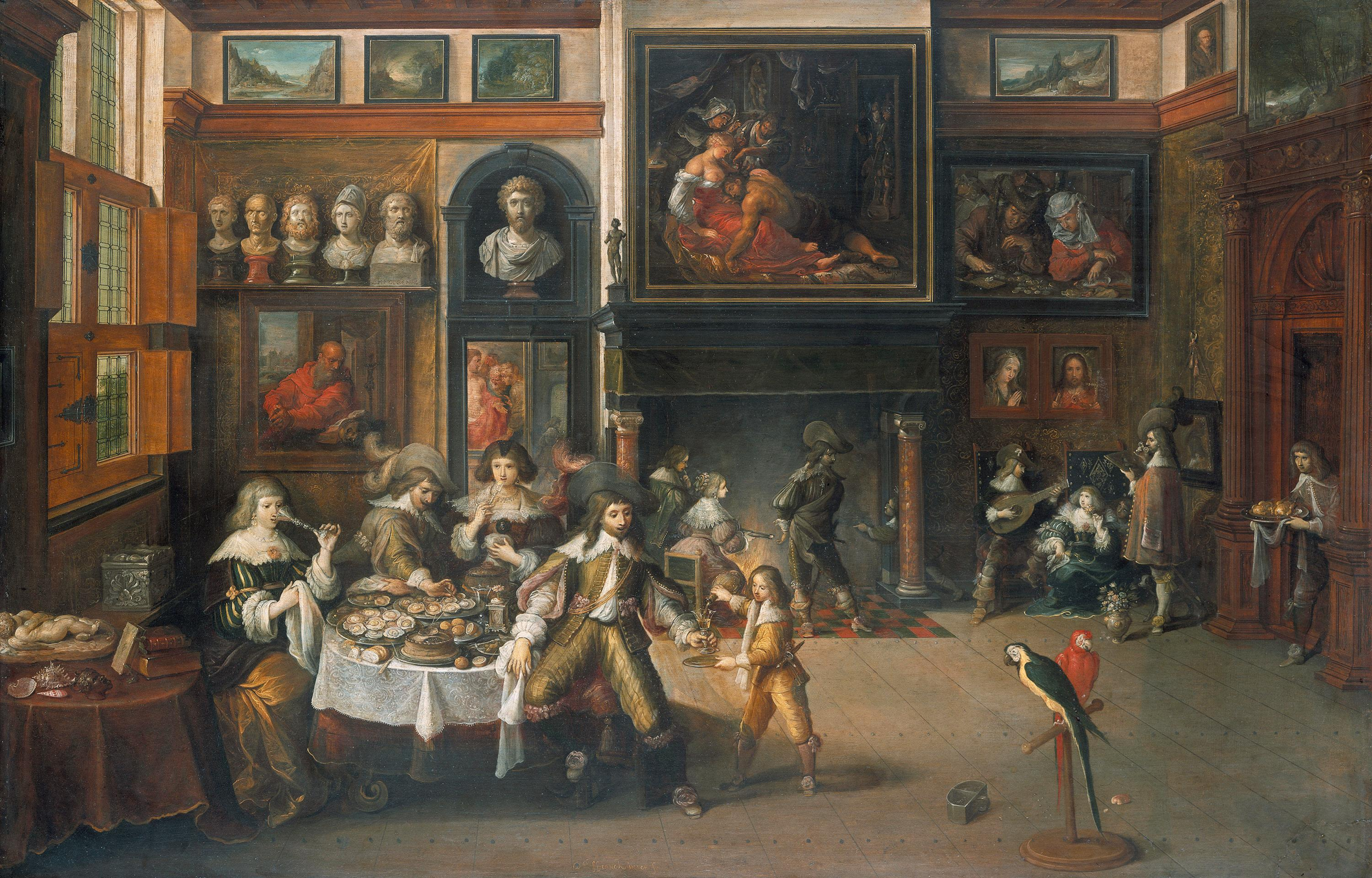
Supper at the house of the Burgomaster Rockox by Frans Francken (II)

Rockox commissioned multiple paintings from Peter Paul Rubens. Some of these commissions were for the public, while others were for his private residence. Among those he commissioned for the public included Adoration of the Magi for the Antwerp City Hall, Descent from the Cross for the city's Arquebusiers' Guild's altar, and The Rockox Triptych for the funerary monument of Rockox and his wife in the Recollects church in Antwerp (now in the collection of the Royal Museum of Fine Arts Antwerp). Rockox's private commissions from Rubens included Samson and Delilah. At the time of his death, Rockox had 82 paintings in his personal collection, of which several by Rubens. Rockox commissioned Frans Francken (II) to make a painting of his art chamber (Bayerische Staatsgemäldesammlungen, Munich). This painting provides a view of the rich collection of Rockox, including two paintings by Rubens and one by Quentin Matsys and various Antique statues and rare objects.

Other artists in his collection included Anthony van Dyck, Frans Snyders, Jan van Eyck, and Pieter Bruegel. After his death, his art collection was sold publicly.

== Numismatist ==
Rockox was also an avid coin collector and kept a detailed catalogue annotated in his own hand (Museum Meermanno, The Hague). His collection was extensive and included Greek and Roman coins from the 5th century BC through to the 2nd century AD. He corresponded with Nicolas Claude Fabri de Peiresc, the renowned French humanist, botanist and numismatist who was also a friend of Rubens. Rockox and Rubens shared the same interest in coins and collaborated with the prominent numismatist Jacob de Bie on the republication of the works of the engraver and numismatist Hubert Goltzius.
