= Mita (name) =

Mita is a surname and a given name in both Japanese and Māori, and a given name in Serbian. Notable people with the name include:

== Surname ==
- Hikaru Mita (born 1981), Japanese football player
- Hiroko Mita (born 1966), Japanese actress
- Maki Mita (三田 真希; born 1983), Japanese swimmer
- Masayuki Mita (born 1969), former Japanese football player
- Merata Mita (1942–2010), New Zealand filmmaker
- Munesuke Mita (1937–2022), Japanese sociologist
- Narayan Ghosh Mita, Bangladeshi writer and film director
- Norifusa Mita (born 1958), Japanese cartoonist
- Ryoichi Mita (1892–1983), Japanese translator
- Ryūsuke Mita (born 1967), Japanese cartoonist
- Yoshiko Mita (born 1941), Japanese actress
- Yūko Mita (born 1954), Japanese voice actress

=== De Mita ===
- Ciriaco De Mita (born 1928), Italian politician
- Giuseppe De Mita, Italian politician
- Vincenzo De Mita, Italian artist

== Given name ==
- Mita Avramov, Serbian poet
- Mita Chenabi, Punjabi poet
- Mita Cuaron, American artist
- Mita Dasog, Canadian scientist and academic
- Mita Haque, Bangladeshi singer
- Mita Khatun, Bangladeshi kabaddi player
- Mita Klima, Austrian tennis player
- Mita Medici, Italian actress
- Mita Mohi, New Zealand traditional weapons expert
- Mita Noor, Bangladeshi actress
- Mita Pardo de Tavera, Filipino health worker
- Mita Petrović, Serbian scientist
- Mita Rahman, Bangladeshi actress
- Mita Rakić, Serbian writer and politician
- Mita Ririnui, New Zealand politician
- Mita Taupopoki, New Zealand Māori tribal leader
- Mita Teriipaia, French Polynesian politician
- Mita Vashisht (born 1967), Indian actress
- Mita, the fictional antagonist of the video game MiSide

== See also ==
- Mita (disambiguation)
- Mito (name)
