= 三田 =

三田 (literally "three fields") may refer to:

== In places ==
- Mita, Minato, Tokyo (三田), a district of Minato, Tokyo, Japan
  - Mita Dōri (三田通り), a four lane avenue which forms the border between Mita 2-chōme and Shiba 5-chōme in Minato, Tokyo, Japan
  - Mita Junior High School (三田中学校), a junior high school in Tokyo
  - Mita Station (三田駅), a railway station near Mita, in Minato, Tokyo, Japan
- Sanda, Hyōgo (三田市), a city located in Hyōgo Prefecture, Japan
  - Sanda Station (三田駅), a railway station in Sanda, Hyōgo Prefecture, Japan
  - Shin-Sanda Station (新三田駅), a railway station in Sanda, Hyōgo Prefecture, Japan
- Santian Village (三田村), an administrative village in Zhenshang, Xinhua, Loudi, Hunan, China
- Samjeon-dong (三田洞), a neighbourhood of Songpa-gu, Seoul, South Korea

== In people ==
- Hiroko Mita (三田 寛子), a Japanese actress
- Norifusa Mita (三田 紀房), a Japanese manga artist
- Yoshiko Mita (三田 佳子), a Japanese actress
- Yūko Mita (三田 ゆう子), a Japanese voice actress

== In other uses ==
- Mita Industrial (三田工業), a former copier company, now a division of Kyocera
- Shintetsu Sanda Line (三田線), a commuter railway line in Hyōgo Prefecture, Japan
- Toei Mita Line (三田線), a subway line in Tokyo, Japan

== See also ==
- Mita (disambiguation)
