= Francesco de Mura =

Italian painter (1696–1782)

Francesco Mura
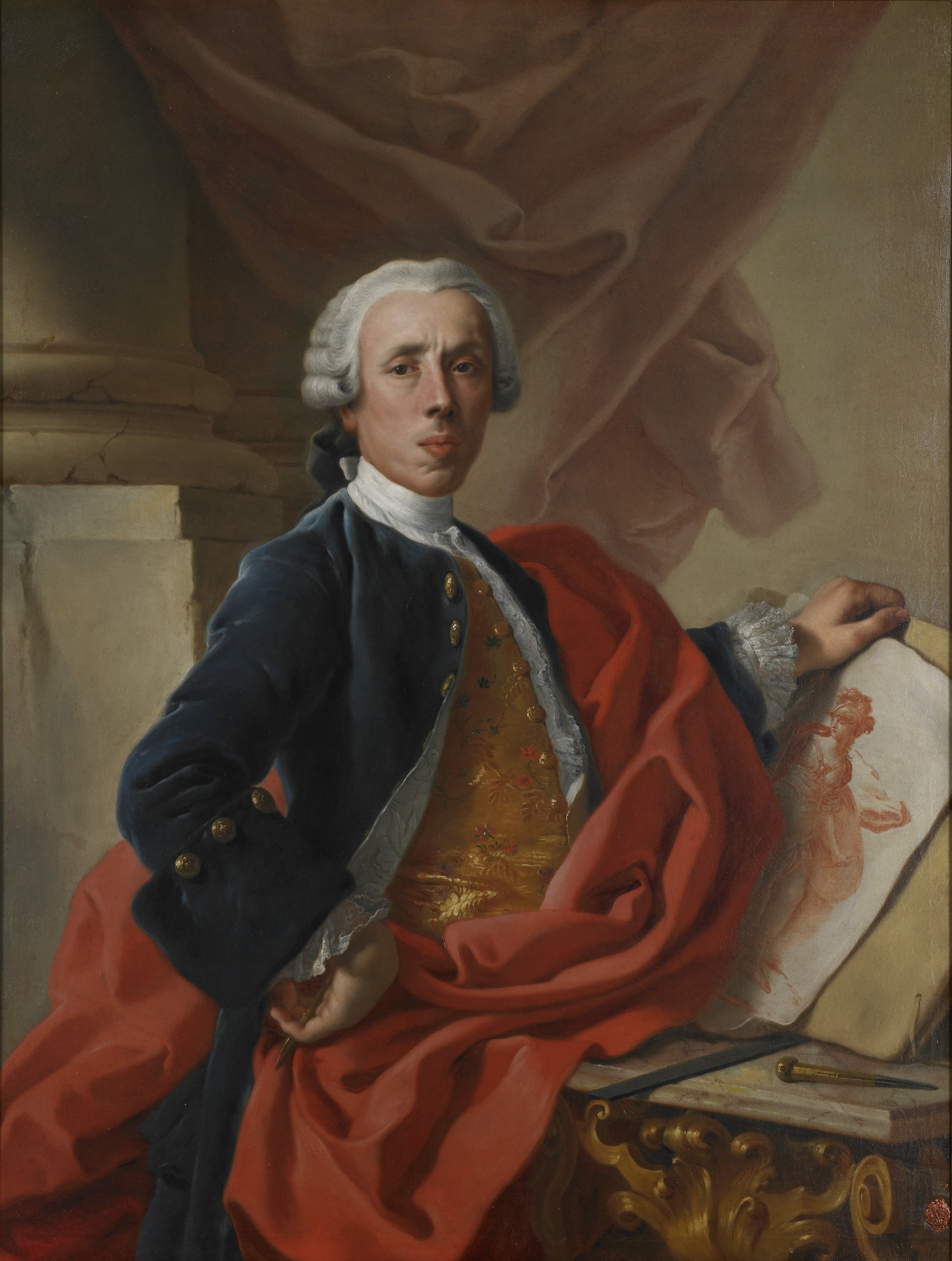
- Self-portrait, c. 1740
- Born: 21 April 1696; Naples, Kingdom of Naples
- Died: 19 August 1782 (aged 86); Naples, Kingdom of Naples
- Education: Domenico Viola; Francesco Solimena
- Occupation: painter

Francesco de Mura (21 April 1696 – 19 August 1782) was an Italian painter of the late-Baroque period, active mainly in Naples and Turin. His late work reflects the style of neoclassicism.

== Life ==
Francesco de Mura, also referred to as Franceschiello, began his formal training as a young boy in the Naples workshop of Domenico Viola, a follower and student of Mattia Preti. He spent roughly a year in Viola's studio before Viola died in 1708. Shortly after Viola's death, the young de Mura moved to the studio of Francesco Solimena, where he studied until 1730 and transitioned toward his signature late-Baroque and Rococo style.

While still in his teens he painted frescoes (1715) in San Nicola alla Carità in Naples. He painted ten canvases of the Virtues and an Adoration of the Magi (1728) for the church of Santa Maria Donnaromita. His early works include frescoes of the Adoration of the Magi (1732) in the apsidal dome of the church of the Nunziatella.

From 1741 to 1743, de Mura lived in Turin, where he worked in the Royal Palace of Turin and met the painter Corrado Giaquinto and the architect Benedetto Alfieri. Upon his return, he enjoyed immense local and royal prestige, working extensively for King Charles VII of Naples (later Charles III of Spain). Through his use of colour, he influenced the realistic elements that characterised the Classicism of 18th-century Neapolitan art. Among his pupils were Pietro Bardellino, Giacinto Diano, Fedele Fischetti, Oronzo Tiso, Nicola Menzele, Vincenzo De Mita and Girolamo Starace.

== Selected works ==
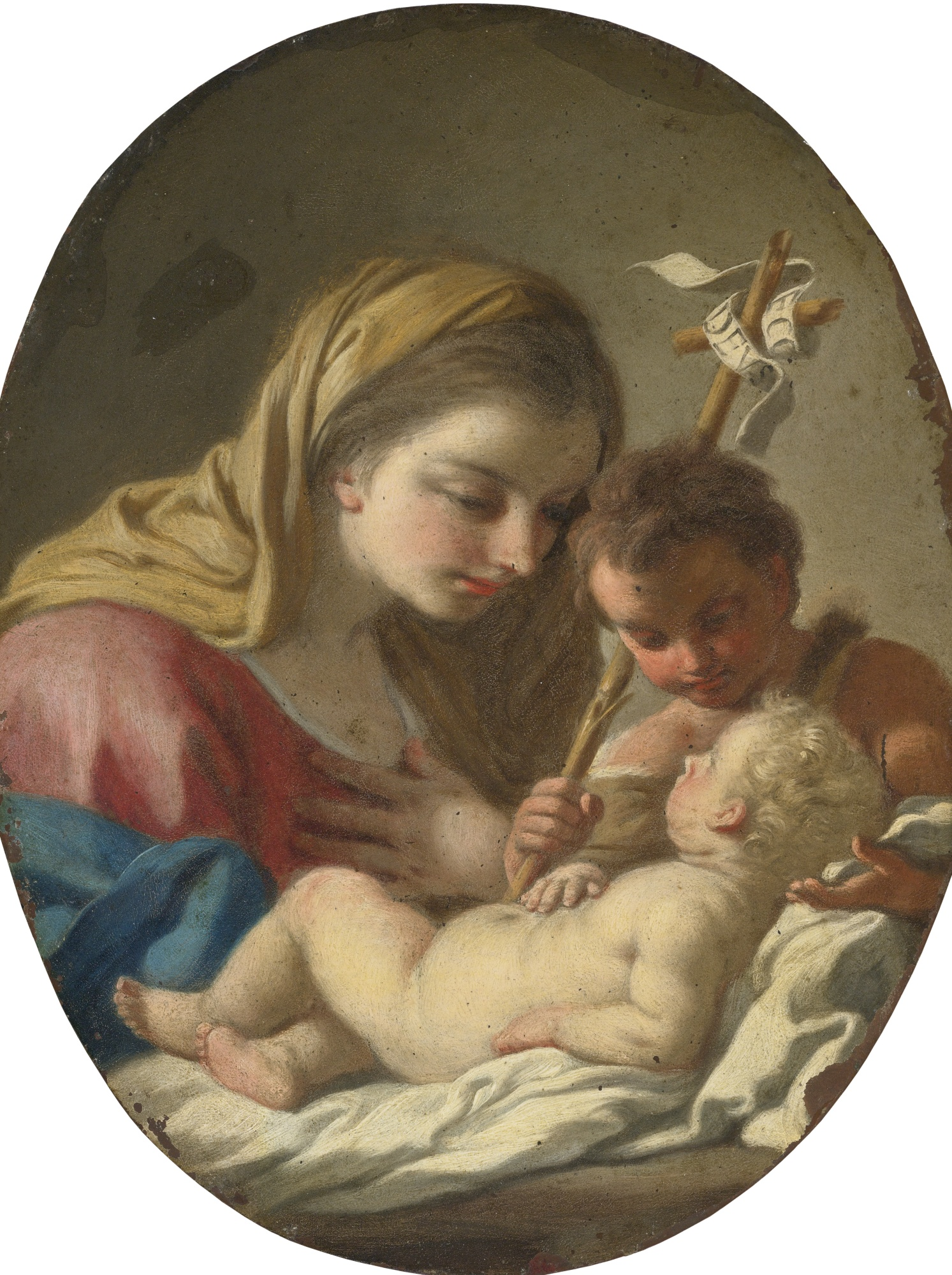
Madonna and Child with the Infant Saint John the Baptist

Allegory of arts

=== Dated ===
- Saint Benedict Welcomes Totila (vers 1710), study for the frescoes at the church of Santi Severino e Sossio, Capodimonte Museum, Naples
- Rest on the Flight into Egypt (1725-1735), Courtauld Institute of Art, London
- Epiphany (1728), Santa Maria Donnaromita, Naples
- Adoration of the Magi (1732), Nunziatella, Naples
- Self-portrait (1740), oil on canvas, Minneapolis Institute of Arts
- The Departure of Aeneas (c. 1740), huile sur toile, 102,5 x 129,5 cm, musée des beaux-arts de Brest, acquired 1969
- Madonna and Child with the Infant Saint John the Baptist (1750), Minneapolis Institute of Arts
- The Visitation (c. 1750), Cornell Fine Arts Museum, Florida
- Horatius Killing his Sister after the Defeat of the Curiatii (c. 1760), oil on canvas, private collection
- The Continence of Scipio (1765), Palazzo Leoni Montanari, Vicenza
- L'Accord entre Camille et Turnus (1765), Palazzo Leoni Montanari, Vicenza
- Christ at the Column (1750–1760).
- St. John the Baptist (1760–1770).
- Assumption of the Virgin (drawing).

=== Undated ===
- Saint Vincent de Paul in Glory, Lazarist Church, Naples
- Assumption of the Virgin, Musée des beaux-arts de l'Ontario, Toronto
- Saint Ignatius de Loyola, Nunziatella, Naples
- Saint François Xavier Preaching to the Natives, Nunziatella, Naples
- Assumption of the Virgin, ceiling of the Nunziatella, Naples
- Portrait of count James Joseph O'Mahoney, lieutenant-general in the service of Naples, knight of Saint Januarius (c. 1748), Fitzwilliam Museum, Cambridge
- The Virgin Mary Presenting a Portrait of Saint Dominic to the Monks of Soriano, Art Institute of Chicago
- The Virgin Mary Indicating the Monogram of Christ to Saint Ludovico di Gonzaga (c. 1750), Gesù Vecchio, Naples
- Allegory of the Arts, musée du Louvre, Paris
- Aurora and Tithon, oil on canvas, Capodimonte Museum, Naples
- The Wedding at Cana, Hôtel d'Agar collection, Cavaillon
- The Flight into Egypt, Hôtel d'Agar collection, Cavaillon

=== School of de Mura ===
- Portrait of Maria Xavieri Romano, Bowes Museum, County Durham, United Kingdom

== Bibliography ==
- Hobbes, James R. (1849). The Picture collector's manual. Vol. 1. London: T. & W. Boone. p. 293.
- Russell, Francis (1983). "De Mura Sketches from the Auldjo Collection". The Burlington Magazine. 125 (959): 96. JSTOR 881172.
- Middione, Roberto (2003). "Mura, Francesco de". Grove Art Online. Oxford University Press. doi:10.1093/gao/9781884446054.article.T060420.
