= Starace =

Starace may refer to:

- Achille Starace (1889–1945), a leader of Fascist Italy
- Giorgio Starace (born 1959), Italian diplomat
- Girolamo Starace (c.1745–1785), baroque period painter
- Francesco Starace (born 1955), Italian business executive
- Potito Starace (born 1981), Italian tennis player
