= Matthias Stom =

17th-century Dutch or Flemish painter

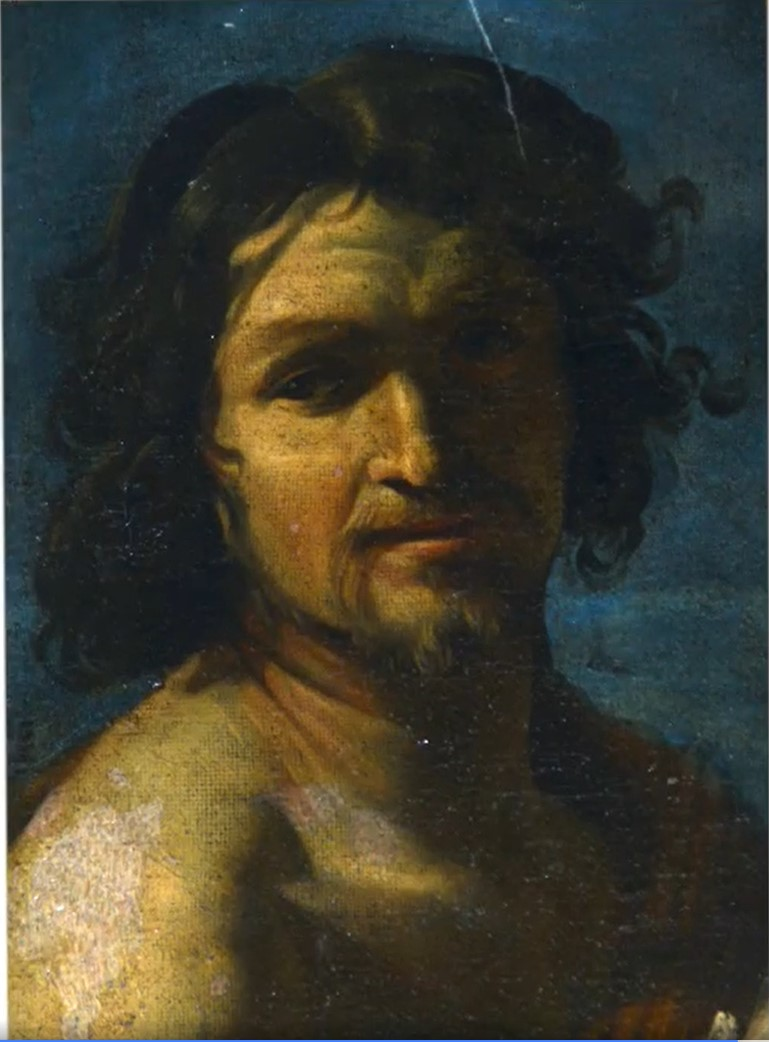
- St Sebastian, possibly a self-portrait (detail of Assumption of Mary with three Saints)
- Born: c. 1600
- Died: After 1652
- Occupation: Painter
- Movement: Caravaggisti; Baroque

Matthias Stom or Matthias Stomer (c. 1600 – after 1652) was a Dutch, or possibly Flemish, painter who is only known for the works he produced during his residence in Italy. He was influenced by the work of non-Italian followers of Caravaggio in Italy, in particular his Dutch followers often referred to as the Utrecht Caravaggists, as well as by Jusepe de Ribera and Peter Paul Rubens. He did not share the other Northern Caravaggisti's preference for humorous, and sometimes scabrous, genre scenes and elaborate decorative allegories but favored stories from the Bible instead. He worked in various locations in Italy where he enjoyed the patronage of religious institutions as well as prominent members of the nobility.

Whereas in the past the artist was usually referred to as Stomer, it is now believed that his actual name was Stom, as this is the name he used as his signature. It was suggested before that his name 'Stom', which means 'dumb' or 'stupid' in Dutch, was given to the artist as a nickname on the assumption that he suffered from this disability. However, there is no evidence for this thesis.

== Life ==
Information about his life is sketchy. His birthplace is undocumented and cannot be determined with any certainty. The Dutch art historian G.J. Hoogewerff wrote in 1942 that the artist was born in Amersfoort, near the city of Utrecht. Hoogewerff, himself a native of Amersfoort, did not provide a source for his statement. The municipal archives of Amersfoort do not record any Stom. The family name Stom by which the artist was in fact known during his lifetime is a Flemish name common in the Southern Netherlands. Most people who bore the name in the Dutch Republic of that time would have been immigrants from the Southern Netherlands. It is therefore very well possible either that Stom was himself Flemish and spent most of his early life and even career in the Southern Netherlands or, alternatively, that he was an émigré (or the son of an émigré) to the Dutch Republic.

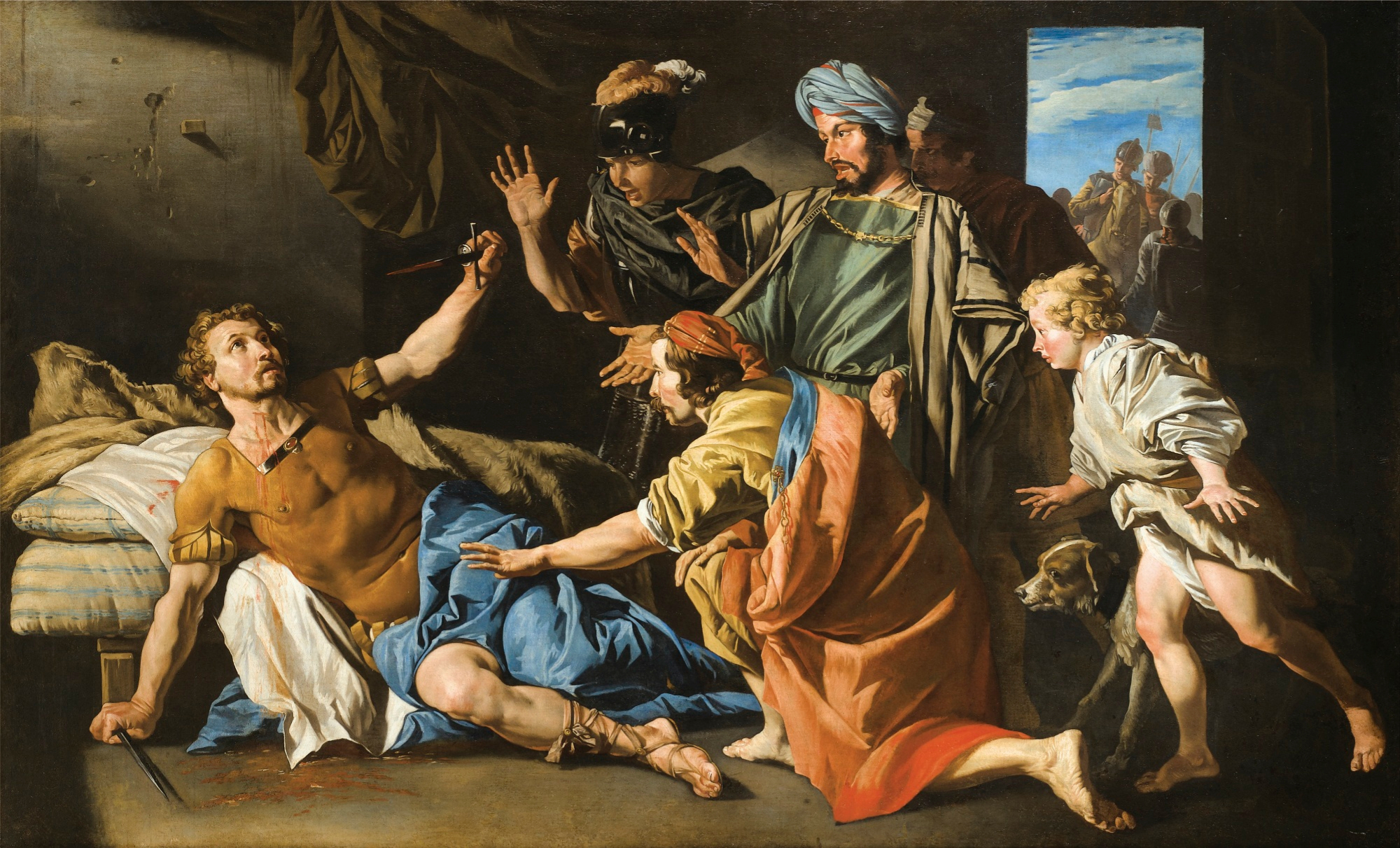
The Death of Brutus

It was traditionally believed that he was a pupil of Gerard van Honthorst, particularly because of the closeness of their style. However, van Honthorst himself did not return from Italy to his native city Utrecht until 1620. It is unlikely that Stom would have embarked upon an apprenticeship with van Honthorst when he was already 20 years old. This still leaves open the possibility that Stom received supplemental training in the workshop of van Honthorst after initially training elsewhere. Alternatively, he could have trained with Hendrick ter Brugghen, another leading Utrecht Caravaggist, who had returned from Italy in 1614, or with other painters such as Joachim Wtewael, Paulus Moreelse or Abraham Bloemaert. No documentary evidence which can shed light on Stom's apprenticeship has been discovered. If Stom was in fact Flemish, the style of his work, which displays links to early 17th-century Flemish painting, points to a training in the Southern Netherlands, possibly with the Antwerp Caravaggist painter Abraham Janssens who had studied in Italy. There exists no documentary evidence to support such a training.

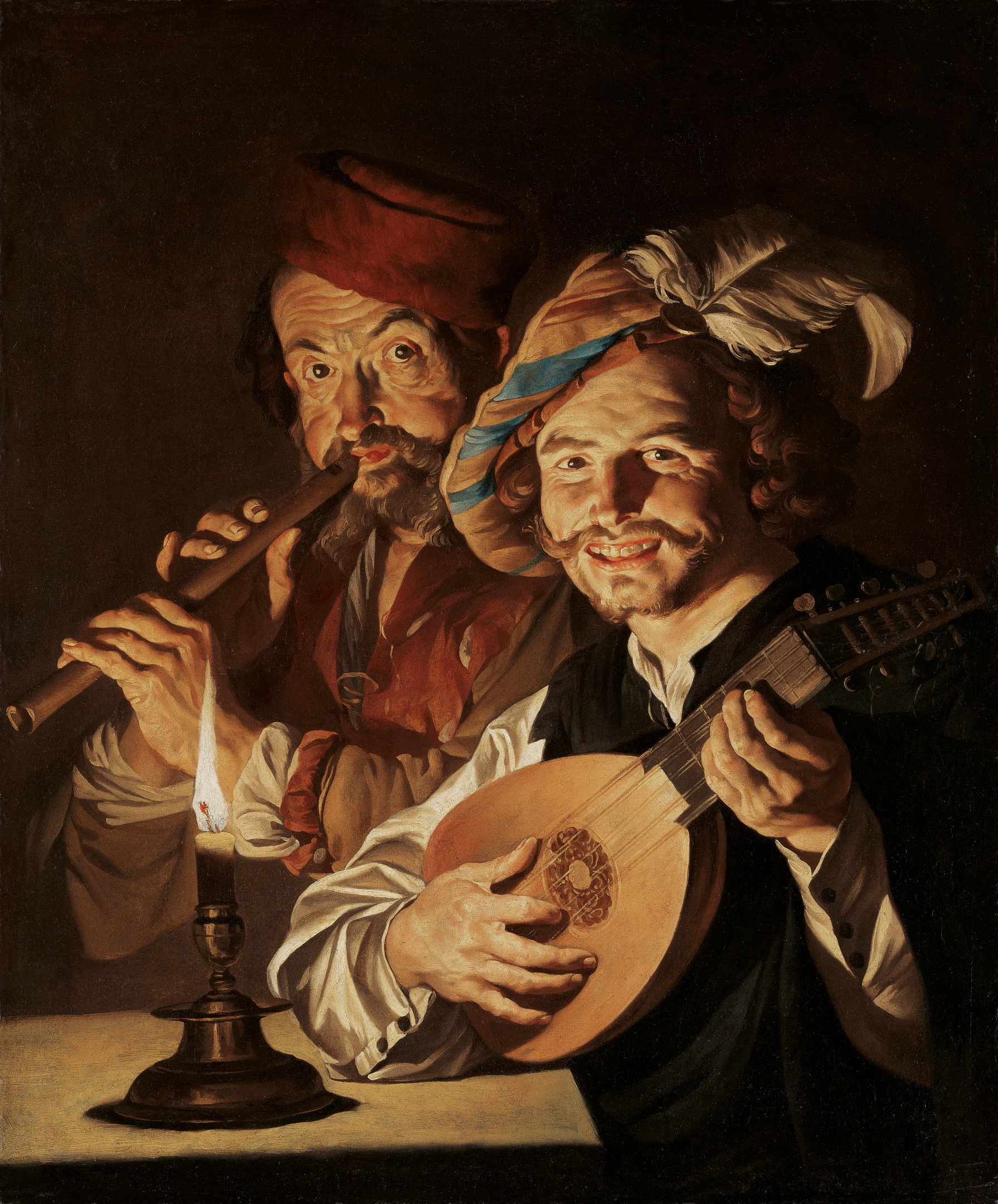
Two Musicians, c. 1632–1639

The earliest documentary evidence of Stom dates to 1630, when a 'Mattheo Stom, fiamengo pittore, di anni 30.' (Matthias Stom, Flemish painter of 30 years old), was recorded living with the French painter Nicolas Provost in the Strada dell'Olmo, Rome. His then residence was the former apartment of the Dutch painter Paulus Bor from Amersfoort who had left Italy four years earlier. Stom was recorded living at this location until 1632. The aforementioned record makes it possible to put the birth of Stom around the year 1600. The large altarpiece of the Assumption of Mary with three saints (now in the church of Santa Maria di Lorino in Chiuduno near Bergamo in Lombardy) dates from the period of his stay in Rome. The painting was purchased from the Roman painter Andrea Sacchi and arrived in the parish church in 1653. According to some art historians, the figure of St. Sebastian is a self-portrait of the artist.

Prior to 1635 Stom left Rome to settle in Naples, where he resided until at least 1640. In Naples he was exposed to the influence of the Spanish Caravaggist painter Jusepe de Ribera. His most important commissions from his Neapolitan period are for a series on the Passion of Christ made for the Capuchin Church of Sant’Efemo Nuovo. These works were lost after this church was turned into a prison in 1865. During his stay in Naples he was likely an influence on local painters Domenico Viola and Domenico Gargiulo. Some payments and a court case against him at the ecclesiastical court of Naples attest to his presence in Naples. The case was filed by his pupil, Mattheus De Roggiero, which shows he operated a workshop in Naples.

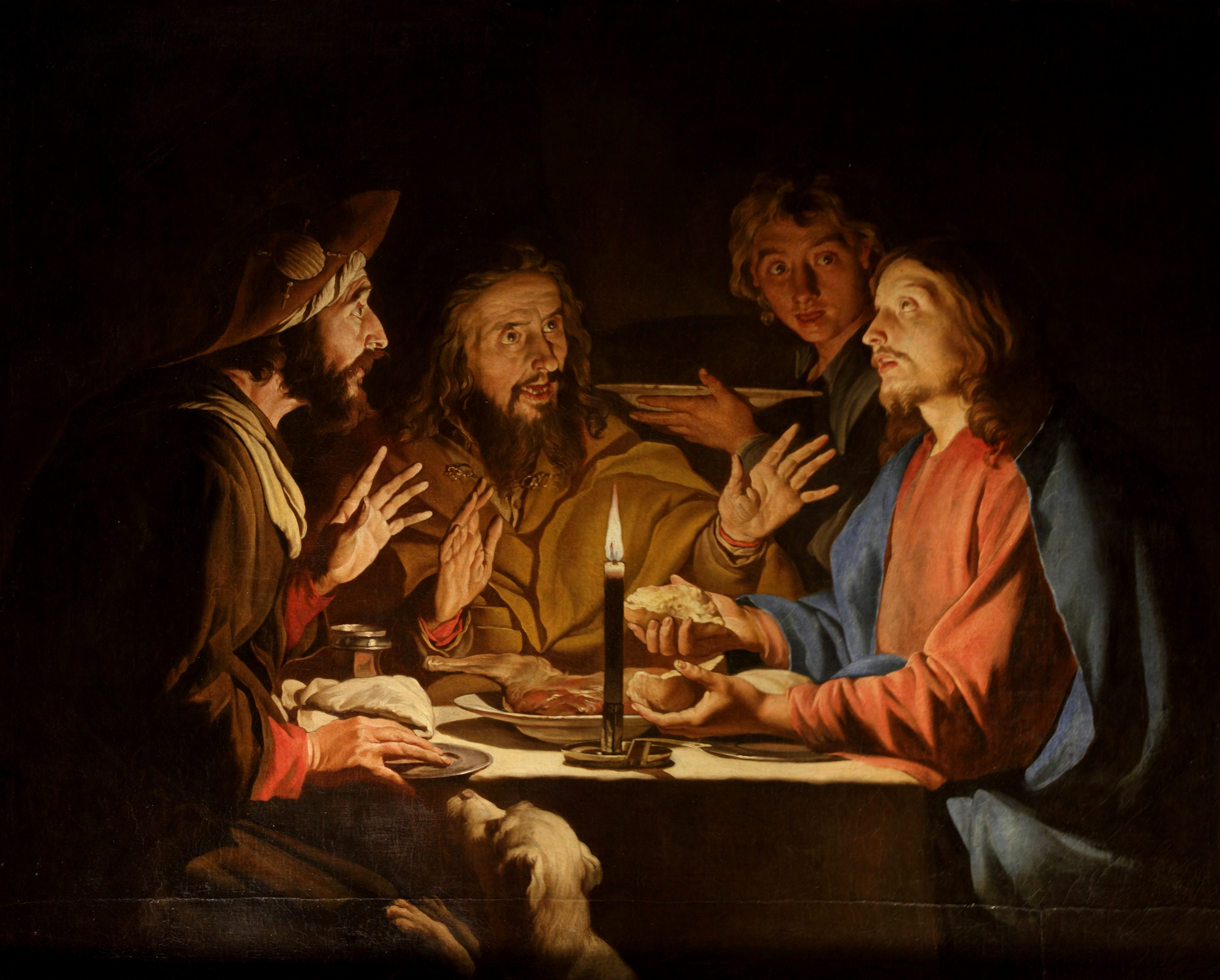
Supper at Emmaus

From his social contacts with English and Dutch sailors it appears that he was more integrated with the expat community than with local society in Naples. He nevertheless had many local patrons as is demonstrated by contemporary Neapolitan inventories. The prosperous Antwerp merchant Gaspar Roomer who resided in Naples may have facilitated his commercial success, although there is no documentary evidence for this. It appears that his candlelight scenes with half figures with their characteristic combination of elements from the oeuvres of Gerrit van Honthorst and Rubens were particularly popular with the local clientele. Stom's documented paintings show no sign of interest in Neapolitan artists of his time. Stom likely left Naples after the novelty of his work had worn out, having been unable or unwilling to adapt to new artistic developments.

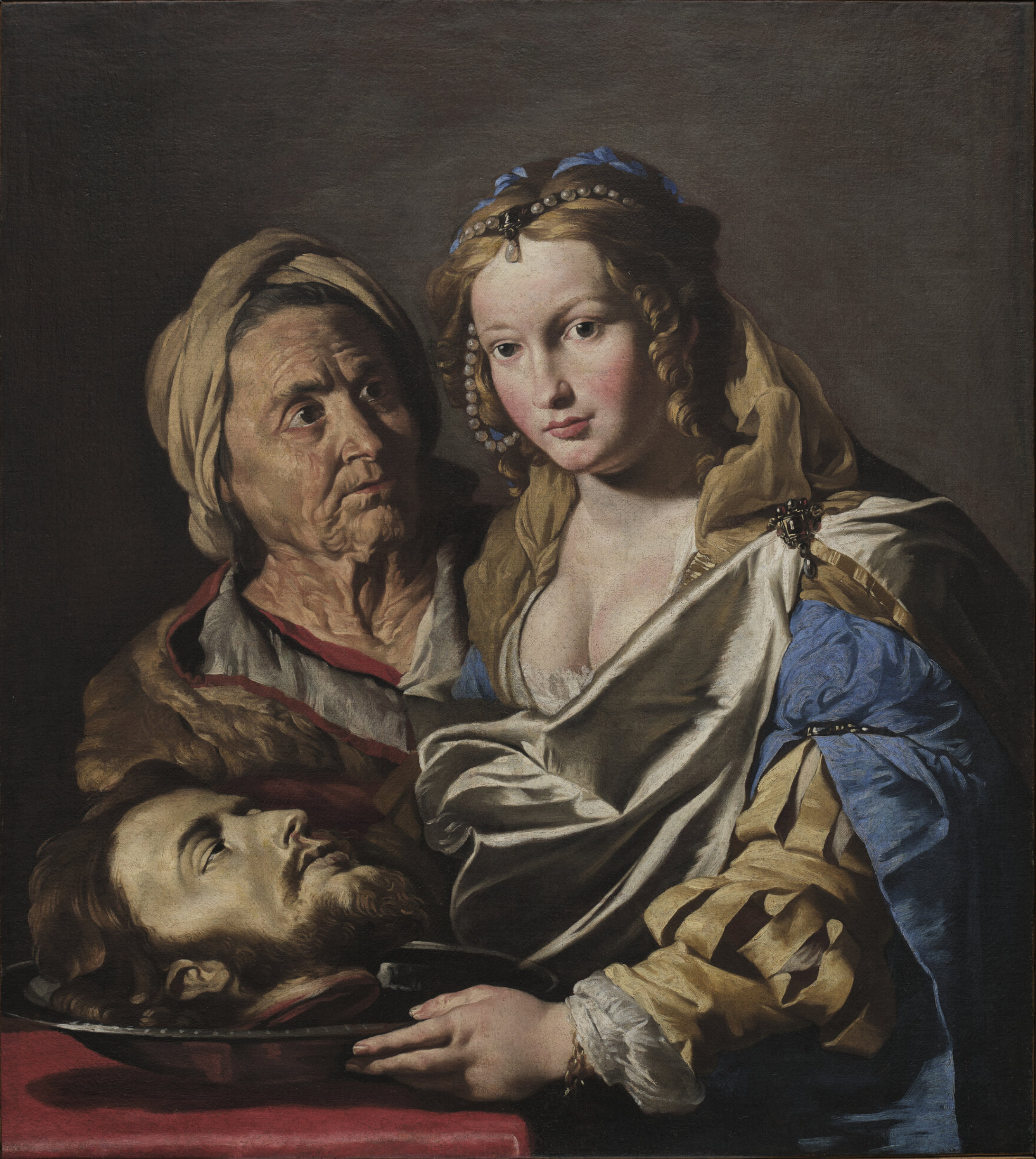
Salome with the Head of Saint John the Baptist

He is recorded in Palermo in Sicily in 1641 when he delivered paintings for churches in nearby Caccamo and Monreale. During his stay in Sicily he painted, amongst others, three paintings for Antonio Ruffo, the duke of Messina, who was an important collector of Italian, Flemish and Dutch art.

Several pictures by Stom were in Maltese collections, which points to Stom having patrons on Malta, though it is unknown if he painted these works on Malta. The last surviving written reference to Stom working in Sicily dates to 1649. His date and place of death are unknown. He may have died in Sicily or in Northern Italy.

A Matteo Stom or Matthias Stom the younger is known to have produced a number of battle paintings in Northern Italy in the late 17th century. He may have been the son or grandson of Matthias Stom.

== Work ==
Stom spent most of his artistic life in Italy, where he produced a great number of works of which around 200 survive. His subject matter is mainly stories in the New and Old Testaments, paintings of saints, and to a lesser extent scenes from classical history, mythology and genre scenes.

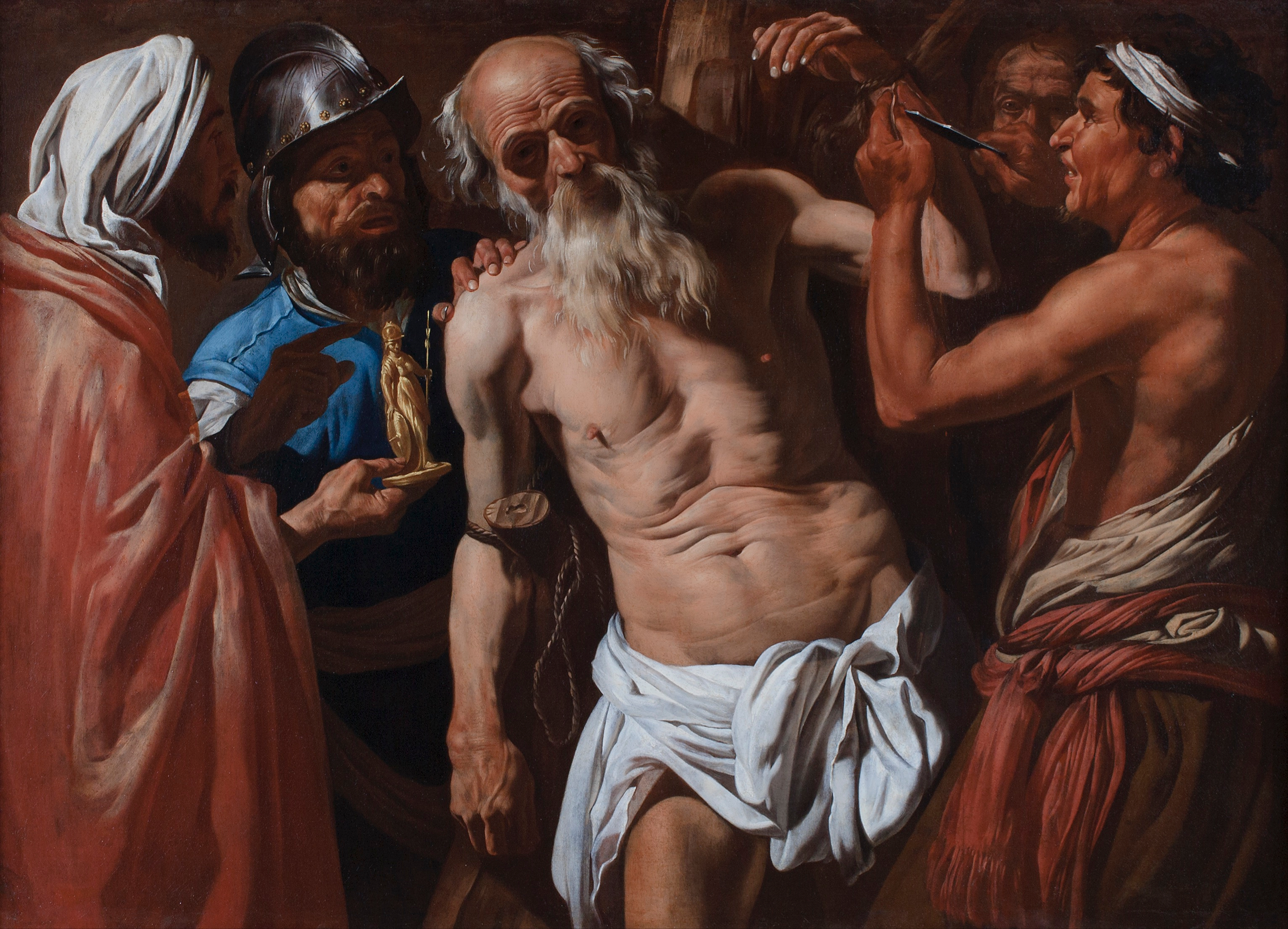
The Martyrdom of Saint Bartholomew

It has been said that Stom's style is very recognizable and that attributions to him are quite easy. His style did not change much over his career and it is possible that his success in the various places where he worked can be explained by the fact that he brought with him his own style that would be a novelty in whichever place he chose to work. There are various obvious influences on his work. The influence of the Utrecht School of Caravaggisti is quite obvious, and in particular of Gerard van Honthorst. Van Honthorst was known in Italy as 'Gherardo della Notte' or 'Gherardo delle Notti' (Gerard of the night(s)) for his candle lit scenes. Stom's works often use the device of a covered candle or other light source to create dramatic chiaroscuro effects. There are also influences of the Antwerp Baroque school, in particular of the early followers of Caravaggio such as Rubens and Abraham Janssens. All of these artists were influenced by the Italian painter Caravaggio and his followers during their stay in Italy and showed a preference for chiaroscuro effects in their work.

Stom also relied in his works on a dramatic chiaroscuro, often created through a single light source such as a candle. The colours red and yellow dominate. The drama of his scenes is emphasized by the vivid gestures and expressions of the figures. Typical is the use of life-sized, half-length figures shown at close range so as to draw the viewer into the action. In contrast to Caravaggio, who places his figures in ambient light and shadow, Stom tends to illuminate his scenes with the stark glow of a candle or other light source which is usually covered. His heads are extraordinarily lively and often have a personal, even portrait-like quality. The expressiveness is further strengthened through the wrinkled, furrowed features which are enveloped in strong chiaroscuro. The works convey a strong psychological intensity in the figures. The skin of the figures is painted so as to give it a clay-like appearance.

== Gallery ==
Selected works

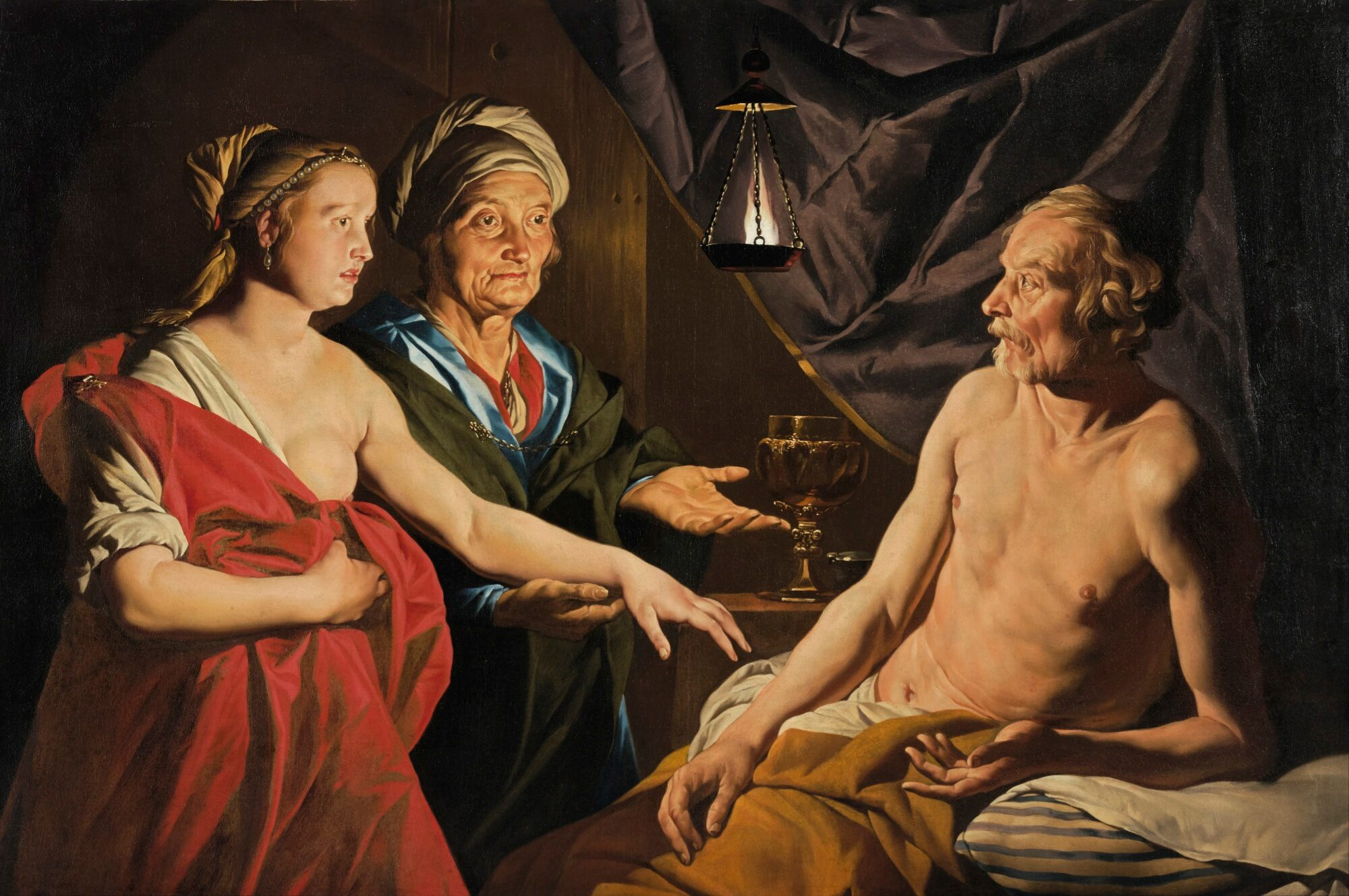
Sarah showing Hagar to Abraham

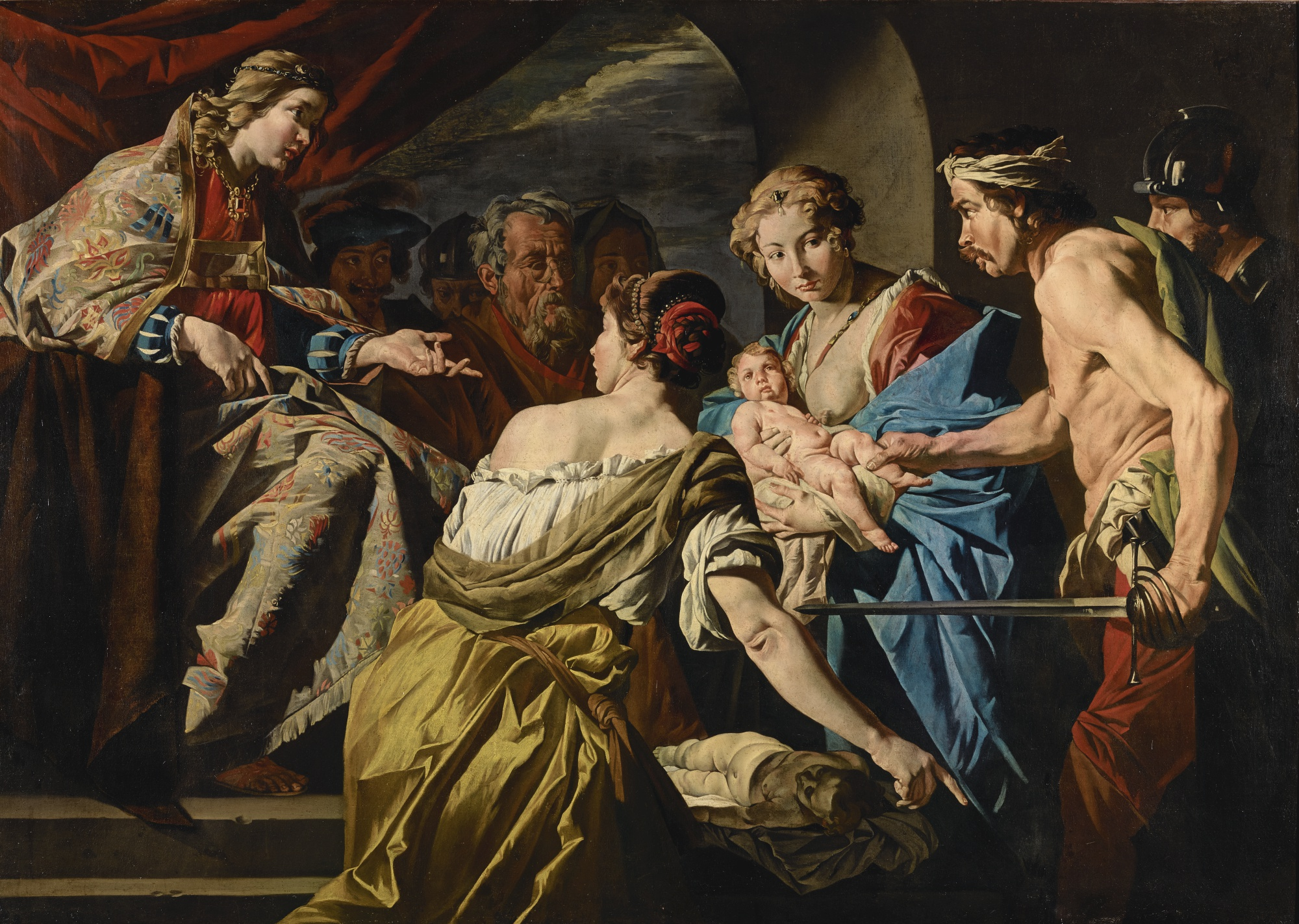
The Judgment of Solomon

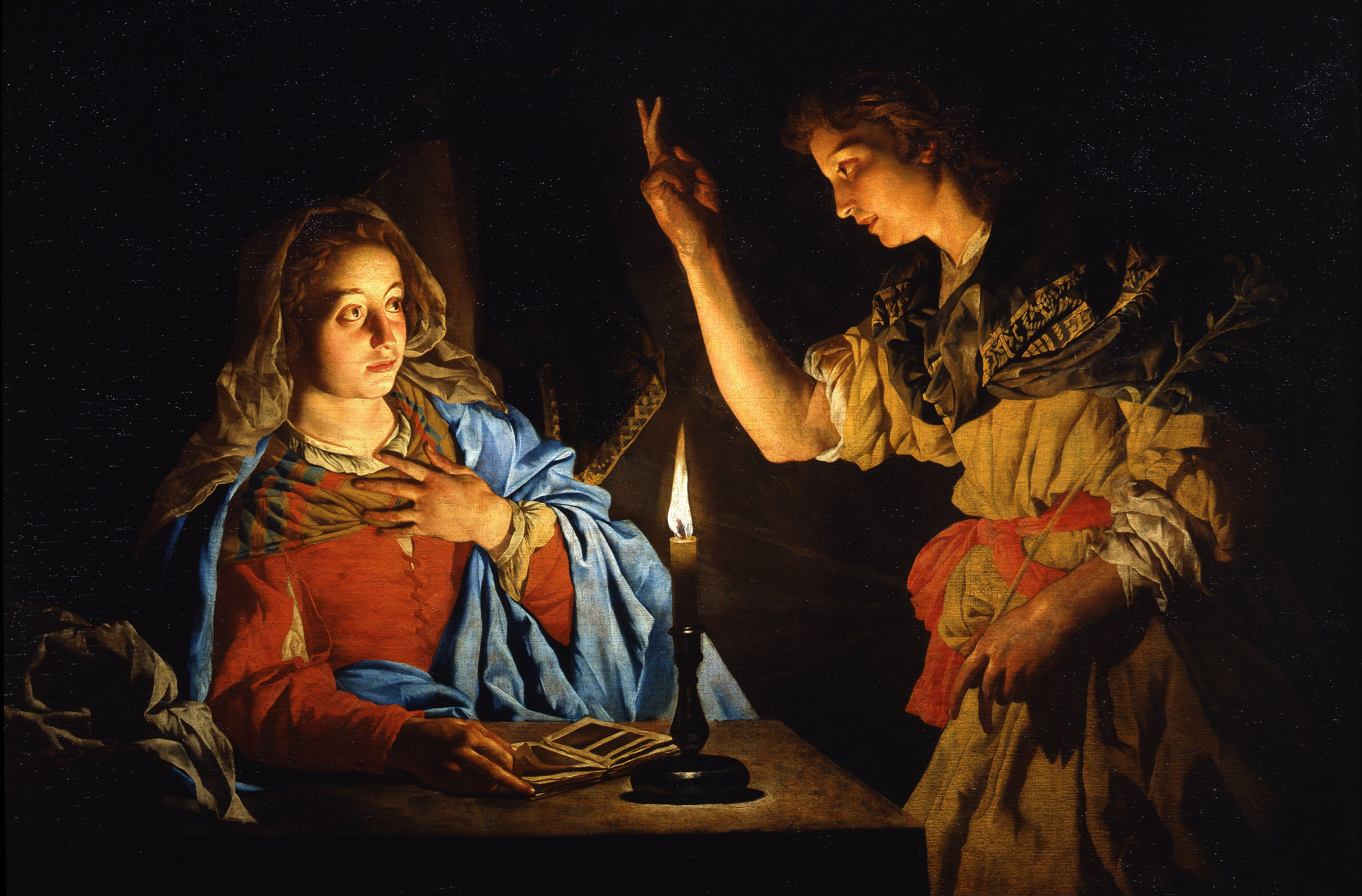
The Annunciation

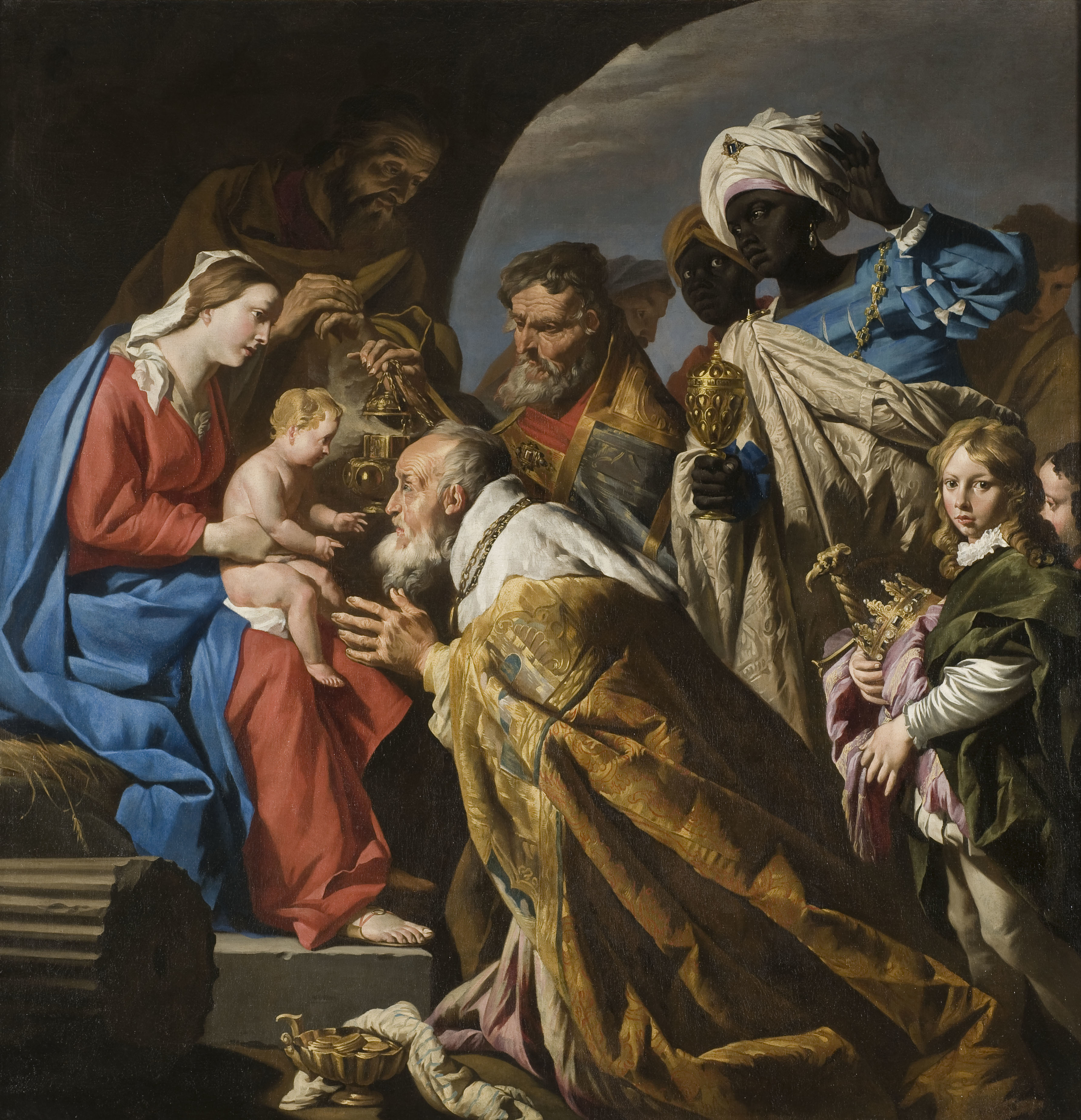
Adoration of the Magi

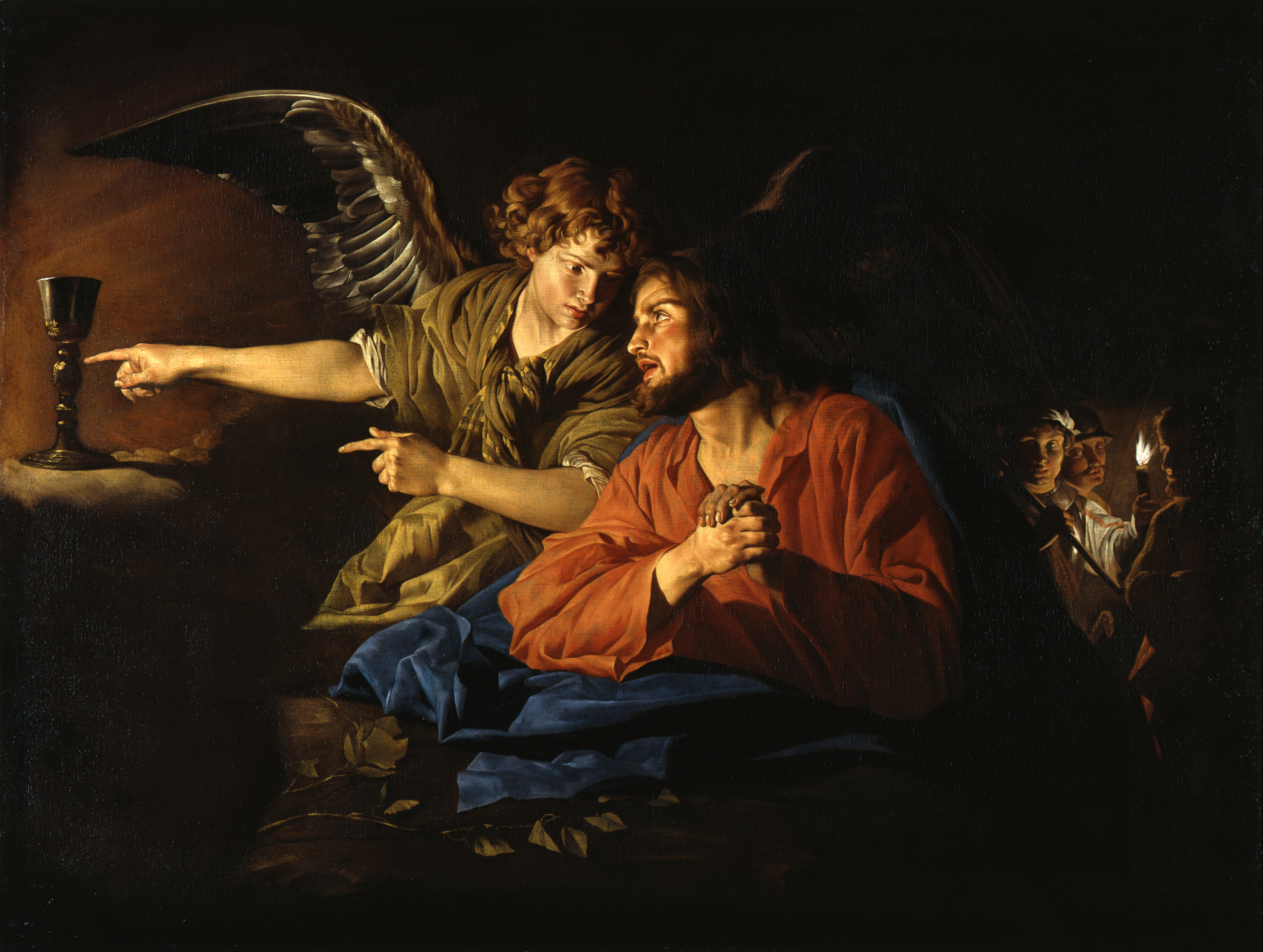
Christ on the Mount of Olives

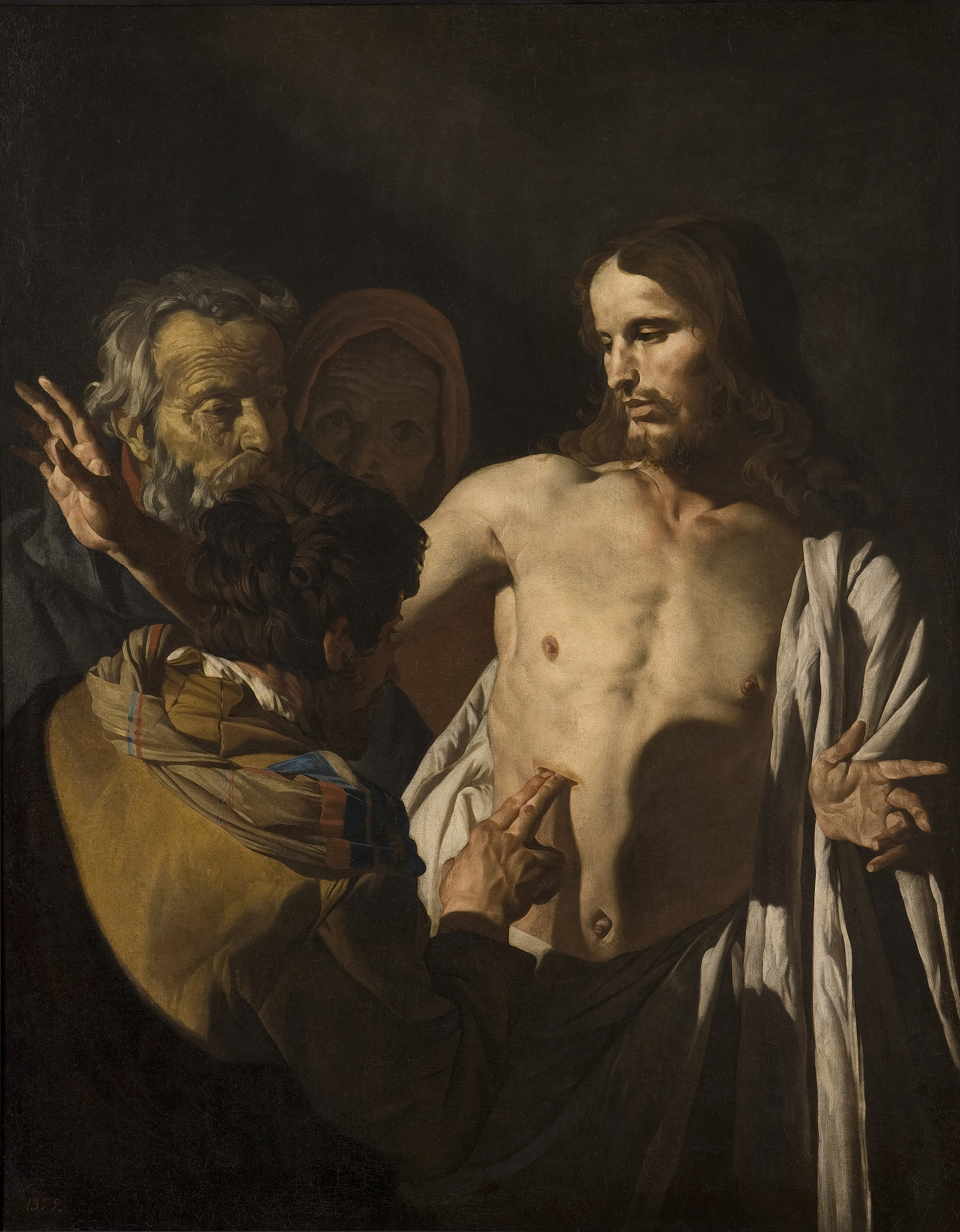
Doubting Thomas

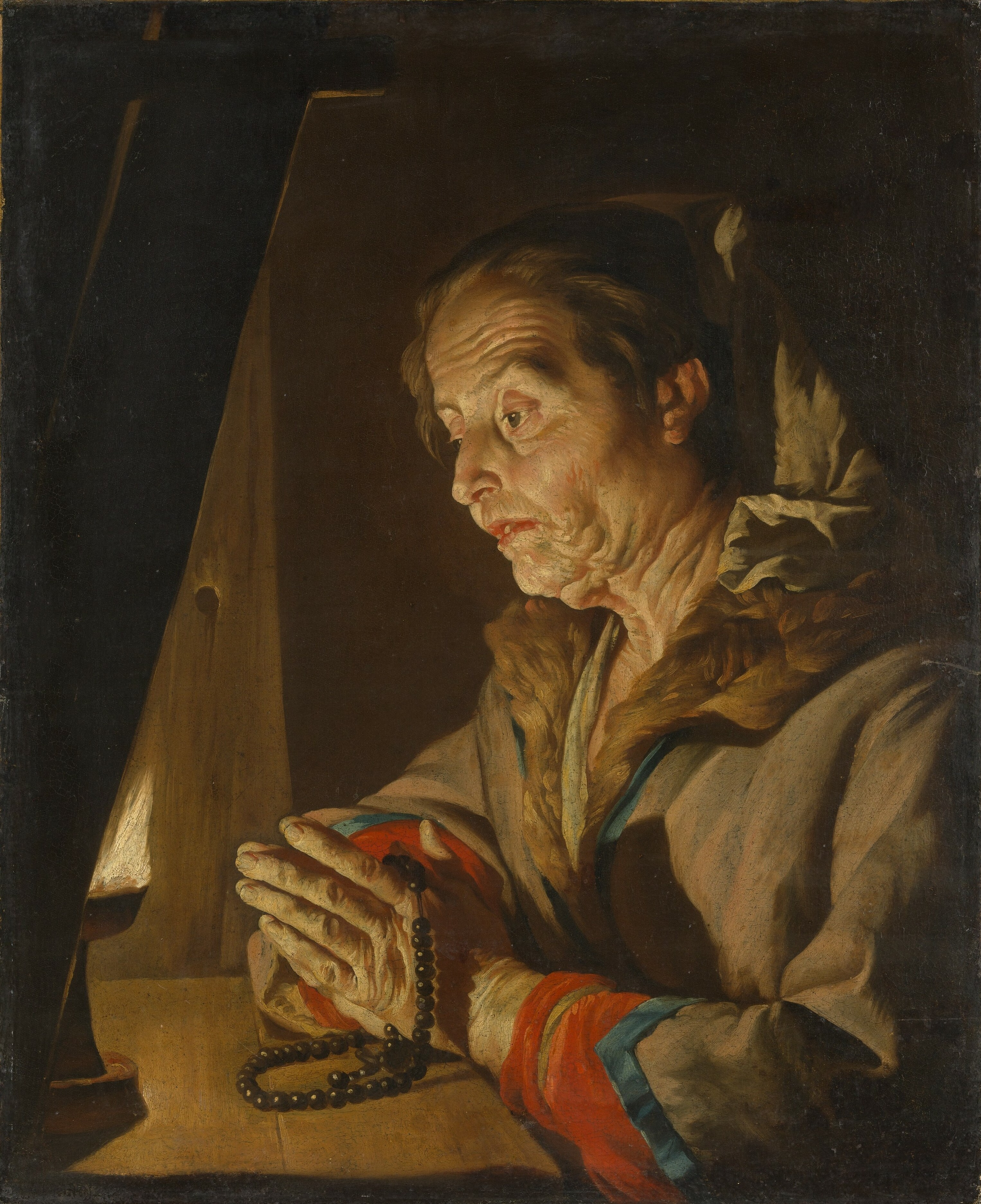
Old Woman Praying

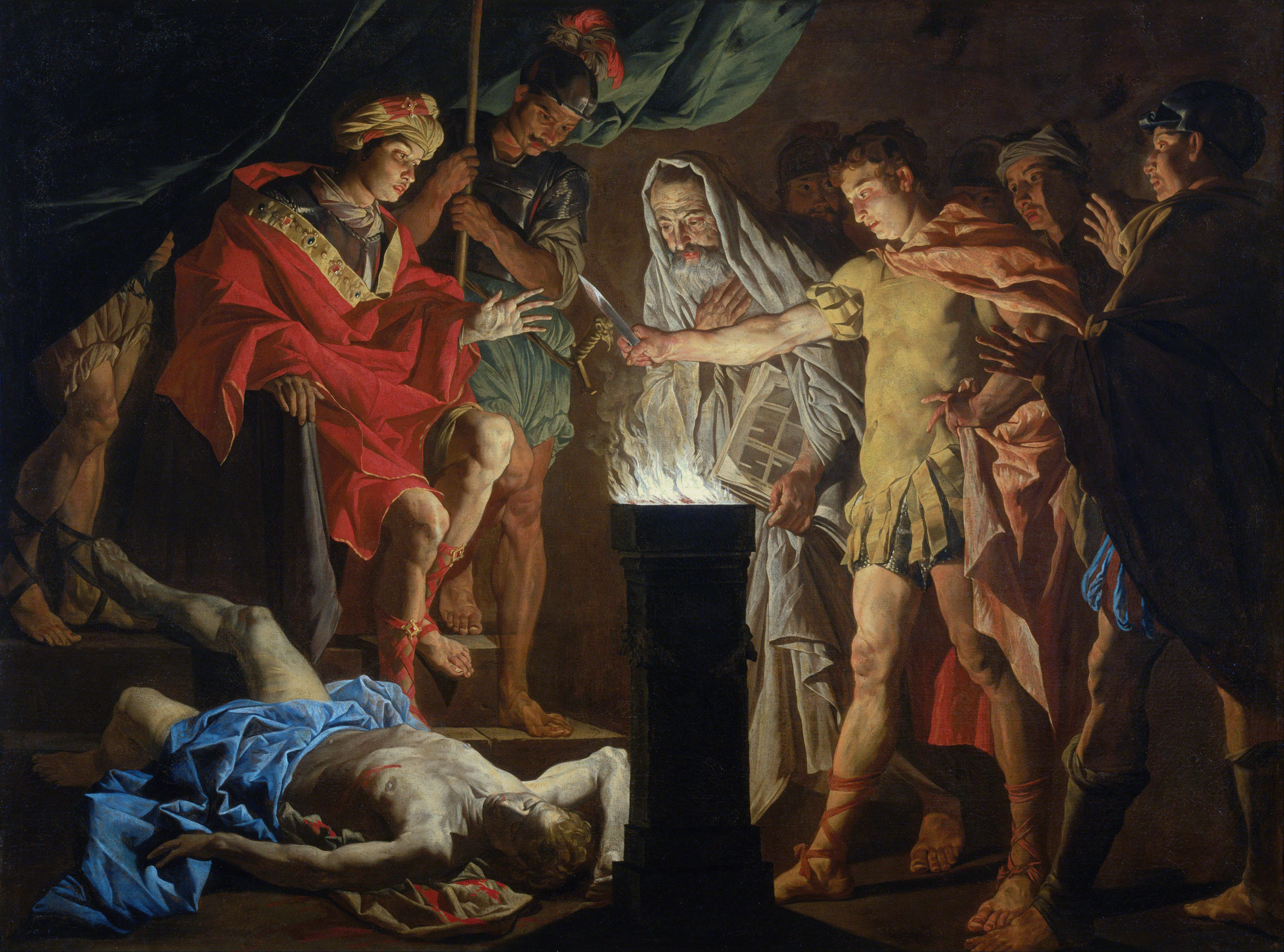
Gaius Mucius Scaevola in the Presence of Lars Porsena
