= Fushimi Sanpō Inari Shrine =

Shinto shrine in Tokyo, Japan

Fushimi Sanpō Inari Shrine (伏見三寳稲荷神社, Fushimi Sanpō Inari Jinja)
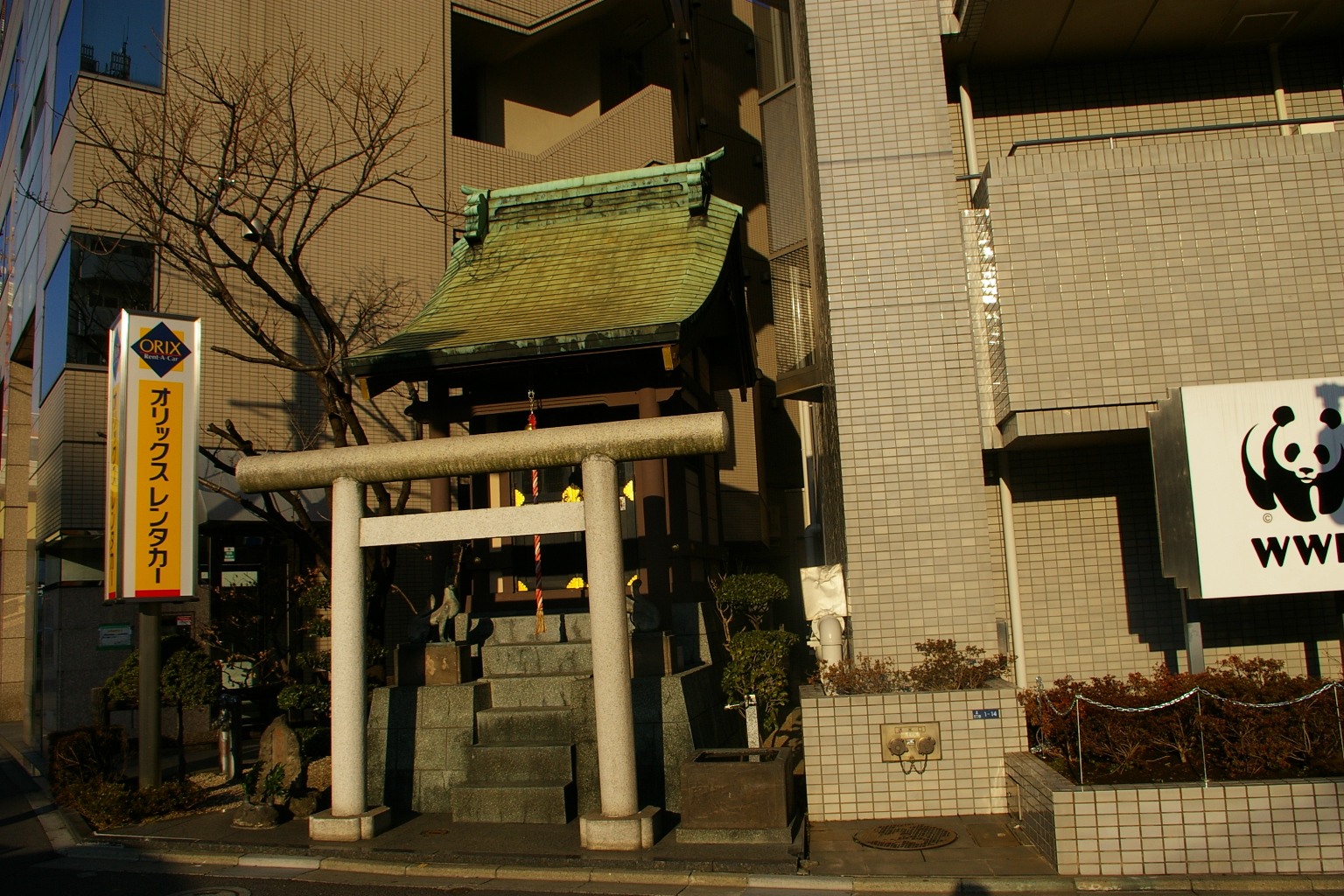
- Fushimi Sanpō Inari Shrine

- Location within Japan

Religion
- Affiliation: Shinto

Location
- Interactive map of Fushimi Sanpō Inari Shrine (伏見三寳稲荷神社, Fushimi Sanpō Inari Jinja)
- Coordinates: 35°39′15.2″N 139°44′43.45″E

Fushimi Sanpō Inari Shrine (伏見三寳稲荷神社, Fushimi Sanpō Inari Jinja) is a Shinto shrine in Shiba 3-chōme, Minato-ku, Tokyo, Japan established to worship Inari. It is located on Mita Dōri next to the Nippon Life Insurance Akabane Bridge building, and across from the Saiseikai Central Hospital. Its roof is made from copper, and the shrine is constructed from concrete.

The land on which the shrine is built was called Shiba Shin'ami-chō during the Edo period on land formerly owned by the Arima clan.
