= Mita =

Mita or MITA may refer to:

== People ==
- Mita (name)
- Mita, king of the Mushki in Asia Minor, 8th century BCE

== Places ==
- Mita, Meguro, Tokyo, a neighborhood in Tokyo, Japan
- Mita, Minato, Tokyo, a neighborhood in Tokyo, Japan
- Mita Dōri, a road in Tokyo, Japan
- Mita Elementary School, a school in Tokyo, Japan
- Mita Hills Dam, a dam in Zambia
- Mita Station, a subway complex in Tokyo, Japan

== Other uses ==
- Mit'a or mita, a form of public service in the Inca Empire and later in the Viceroyalty of Peru
- Mita (restaurant), in Washington, DC
- Mita Congregation, a Puerto Rican church organisation
- Mita Industrial Co., a former producer of photocopiers
- Maine Island Trail Association, preservation group in Maine, U.S.
- Melbourne Immigration Transit Accommodation, a detention centre in Victoria, Australia
- Stimulator of interferon genes, a protein

== See also ==
- Meeta, a fictional character portrayed by Parineeti Chopra in the 2014 Indian romantic comedy film Hasee Toh Phasee
