= Mita Petrović =

Serbian scientist

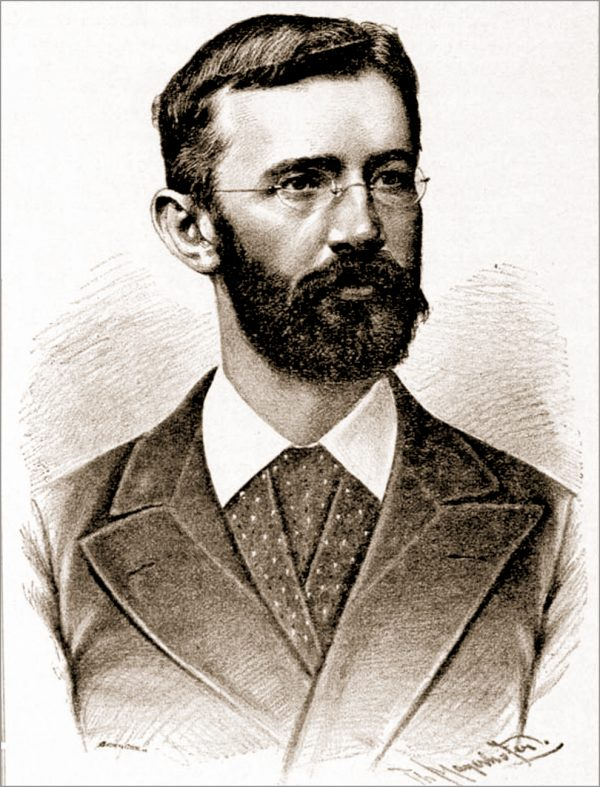
Petrović in 1890

Dimitrije "Mita" Petrović (Pančevo, Austrian Empire, 24 October 1848 — Budapest, Austria-Hungary, 17 December 1891) was an ethnically Serbian scientist from Austria-Hungary. He worked in the field of agrochemistry. He was also a naturalist, ethnologist and pedagogue, professor of natural sciences at the Serbian Teachers' College in Sombor. He was a corresponding member of the Serbian Academic Society since 1883, and a corresponding member of the Serbian Royal Academy (Academy of Natural Sciences) since 1888.

== Life and work ==
Mita Petrović was born on 24 October 1848 in Pančevo, then part of the Habsburg Empire. His father was a barber and merchant, and his mother a teacher. He attended primary school and two grades of lower secondary school in Pančevo. He finished the lower grammar school in Sremski Karlovci and the higher grammar school in 1868 in Vinkovci. As a gifted student, he received a scholarship to study natural sciences and mathematics at the universities of Halle and Tübingen, and after graduating, he spent two semesters at the University of Prague until 1871. He returned in 1871 and became a professor of natural sciences and mathematics at the Serbian Teacher's College in Sombor, where he remained until his death. Immediately after his arrival in Sombor, the Sombor teacher's college received a chemistry laboratory, and chemistry was included in the curriculum. Since Sombor was affected by severe floods and pollution of wells between 1871 and 1873, a cholera epidemic broke out in the city. Mita Petrović, together with Josif Volrat, performed chemical and microbiological analyzes of water and its sterilization. Later, in 1887, he actively participated in the drilling of the first artesian well. In addition to water, he later analyzed soil, wine and brandy. He chemically proved the falsification of wine and brandy. As a young teacher in 1873, he began writing textbooks for the subjects he taught at the college, and he began publishing his first professional papers in 1875. His first significant scientific work was Расток и како се њиме бојадише коса ("Growth and how hair is dyed"). In Gorica in 1882 he attended courses in viticulture and silkworm breeding.

He diligently followed the development of his profession and wrote about the results of natural sciences in European journals of the time. He published the results of his examinations and research. He was the first one to introduce experimental instruction as a foundation for the proper apprehension of the notions and laws of natural sciences. Of great importance was his collection of teaching aids which he assembled in this school, which continued to develop and grow decades after his death. Petrović's writing opus is among the most important and most voluminous works written in Serbian, not only in the instruction process but also in the theory and practice of natural sciences during the whole last quarter of the nineteenth century. His scientific approach, striving for and adaptation of the highest scientific standards contributed significantly to the instruction of science in Serbian schools to be set up on new, modern foundations, and to go in step with the teaching practice of the most developed European countries at the time.

He was also politically active for a time. As such, he was elected a member of the Karlovac Church-People's Assembly.

== Works ==
- Расток и како се њиме бојадише коса ("Growth and how hair is dyed"),
- Алкаличне баре у сомборској околини ("Alkaline ponds in the Sombor area"),
- Сремско вино, ("Srem wine"),
- Петроварадинска чесма ("Petrovaradin fountain"),
- Појаве при грађењу бермета и израђивање екстракта ("Occurrences during the construction of bermet and production of extracts"),
- Баре у Бачкој ("Ponds in Bačka"),
- Фрушкогорски извори и помени о њима у старој књижевности ("Fruška Gora springs" and mentions of them in old literature"),
- Производња ракије у нашем народу ("Production of brandy in our people"),
- Пијаћа вода како се набавља и испитује ("Drinking water as it is procured and tested"),
- Артески бунар у Сомбору ("Artesian well in Sombor"),
- Земља у Бачкој ("Land in Bačka"),

Mita Petrović was especially committed to the popularization of natural sciences in the rational cultivation of the land. So he wrote: "On knowing the country", "On repairing the country", etc. He also wrote literary reviews, reviews, papers and travelogues. While studying in Prague, he collaborated in the Czech magazine "Politika", and sent "Letters from the Road" to the newspaper Pančevac. His pedagogical articles were published in various scholastic journals and periodicals in Serbia and abroad.

== Literature ==
- Narodna enciklopedija srpsko-hrvatsko-slovenačka, Zagreb, 1924–1929.
- V. Aleksijević: Contemporaries and Consequences of Dositej Obradović and Vuk Stefanović Karadžić: bio-bibliographic material. The manuscript is kept in the Department of Special Funds of the National Library in Belgrade. R 425/10 (V. Aleksijević).
- V. Kunc: "M. Petrović, a prominent literary, pedagogical and scientific worker - our meritorious chemist". Bulletin of the Chemical Society 20 (1955).
- I. Gutman, D. Prodanović: "Mita Petrović - chemist from Sombor", Phlogiston 5 (9) (2000) 123–142.
- I. Gutman, D. Prodanović:" Manuals and the first agrochemical analyzes in Bačka professor Mita Petrović". In: Natural and Mathematical Sciences in Serbs 1850–1918. Novi Sad, 2001. p. 219–229.
- "Life and work of Serbian Scientists", # 8, SANU, 2002, p. 29–60 (I. Gutman, D. Prodanović).
