= Girolamo Starace =

Italian painter (c. 1745 – 1785)

Girolamo Starace (c. 1745 – 1785) was an Italian painter of the late-Baroque period, active mainly in Naples.

== Life ==
He trained under Francesco de Mura. Among his works are the decoration of the stairwell of the Royal Palace of Caserta and in the palace of marchese Berio
