= Zhenshang, Xinhua =

Zhenshang Town 圳上镇
- Town
- Location in Hunan
- Coordinates: 28°05′36″N 111°22′20″E
- Country: People's Republic of China
- Province: Hunan
- Prefecture-level city: Loudi
- County: Xinhua

Area
  - Total: 254 km^{2} (98 sq mi)

Population
  - Total: 63,000
  - Density: 250/km^{2} (640/sq mi)
- Time zone: UTC+8 (China Standard)
- Postal code: 417614
- Area code: 0738

Zhenshang Town (simplified Chinese: 圳上镇; traditional Chinese: 圳上鎮; pinyin: Zhènshǎng Zhèn) is an urban town in Xinhua County, Hunan Province, People's Republic of China.

== Administrative divisions ==
The town is divided into 71 villages and one community, which include the following areas:

- Daqiao Community
- Chucai Village
- Zhenshang Village
- Shantang Village
- Jiuda Village
- Shenxian Village
- Xiangrong Village
- Fangronghua Village
- Yongsheng Village
- Fangjiawan Village
- Wenjiao Village
- Fangmaping Village
- Pingshan Village
- Ganjia Village
- Tieshichong Village
- Liunanshan Village
- Dongjiang Village
- Shutang Village
- Taiyuan Village
- Xinquan Village
- Fengjia Village
- Zhizi Village
- Shanxi Village
- Youyu Village
- Xiangjia Village
- Dingxin Village
- Xinsheng Village
- Tuoshan Village
- Huilong Village
- Zaoxi Village
- Dazhu Village
- Santian Village
- Luxi Village
- Zhuzi Village
- Xiejia Village
- Dongxi Village
- Shuangjiang Village
- Hemu Village
- Hainan Village
- Shanshan Village
- Yanxi Village
- Liujia Village
- Liuzhong Village
- Shizhong Village
- Fengjia Village
- Tanshan Village
- Aotang Village
- Jintang Village
- Longju Village
- Yonglong Village
- Huangxi Village
- Liming Village
- Nanhua Village
- Tongzi Village
- Songshan Village
- Chizhu Village
- Jinzhu Village
- Xiejiabai Village
- Baimao Village
- Renhe Village
- Zhongru Village
- Shancha Village
- Jinlu Village
- Chenjiawan Village
- Zhonglu Village
- Shuguang Village
- Banshan Village
- Dongyi Village
- Jiangxia Village
- Xujia Village
- Pingyun Village
- Dongsheng Village
