= Missione ai Vergini =

Church in Naples, Italy

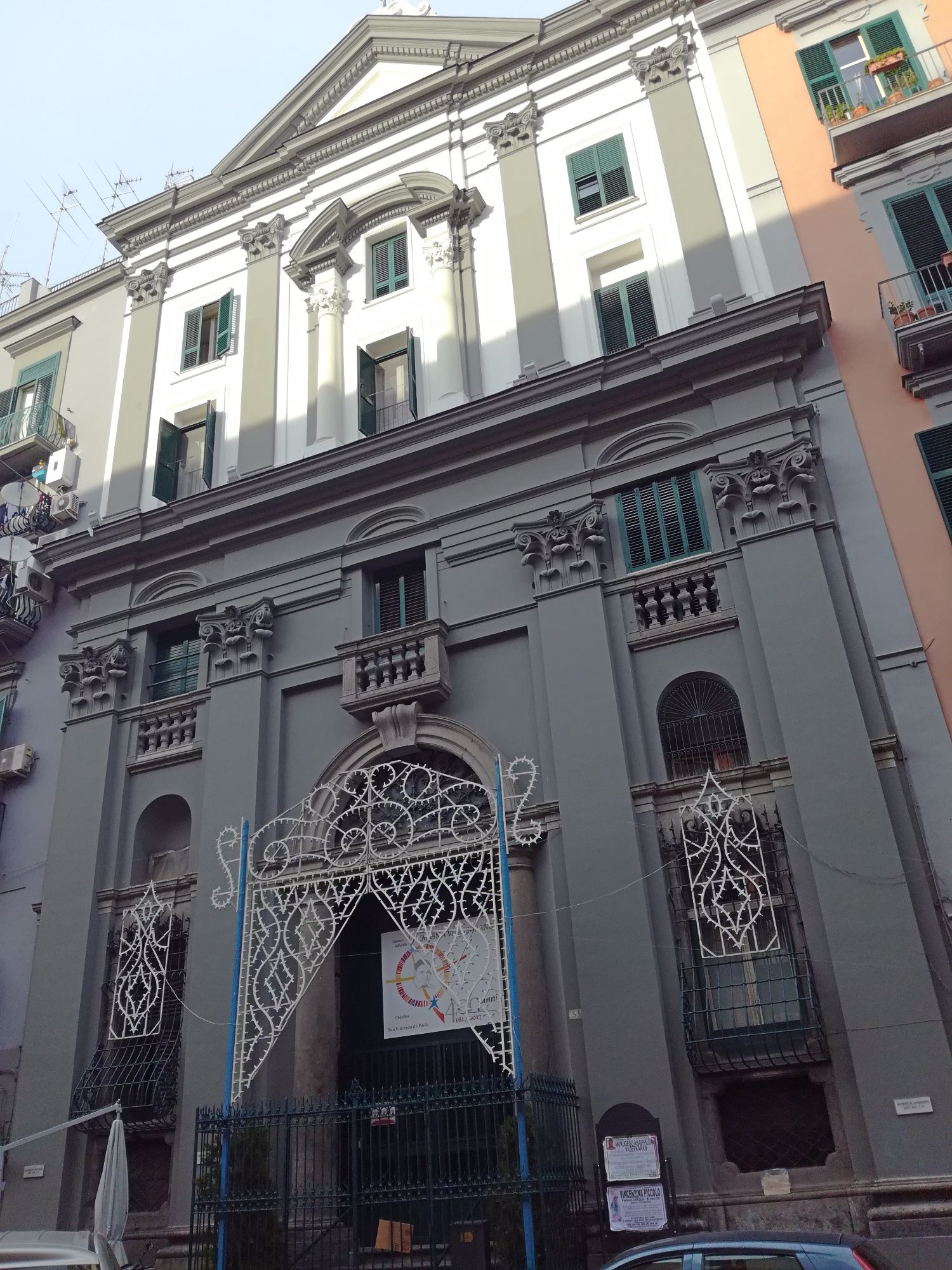
The main frontage

The Church of the Missione ai Vergini (Italian: Chiesa della Missione ai Vergini) is a church at 51 via Vergini in the historic centre of Naples, not far from the National Archaeological Museum of Naples.

The Congregation of the Mission first set up a base in Naples in the 16th century, initially at Santa Maria dei Vergini, with a monastery alongside, thanks to a donation by the duchess of Sant'Elia, Marie-Josèphe de Brandis-Staremberg. In the 18th century they built a new monastery and church, under the supervision of Father Gargiani and to designs by Luigi Vanvitelli. These began in 1724 but only completed in 1760, with the facade (designed by an unknown architect) remaining incomplete until 1788. The building was damaged in the bombardment of Naples in 1943 and restored after the war.

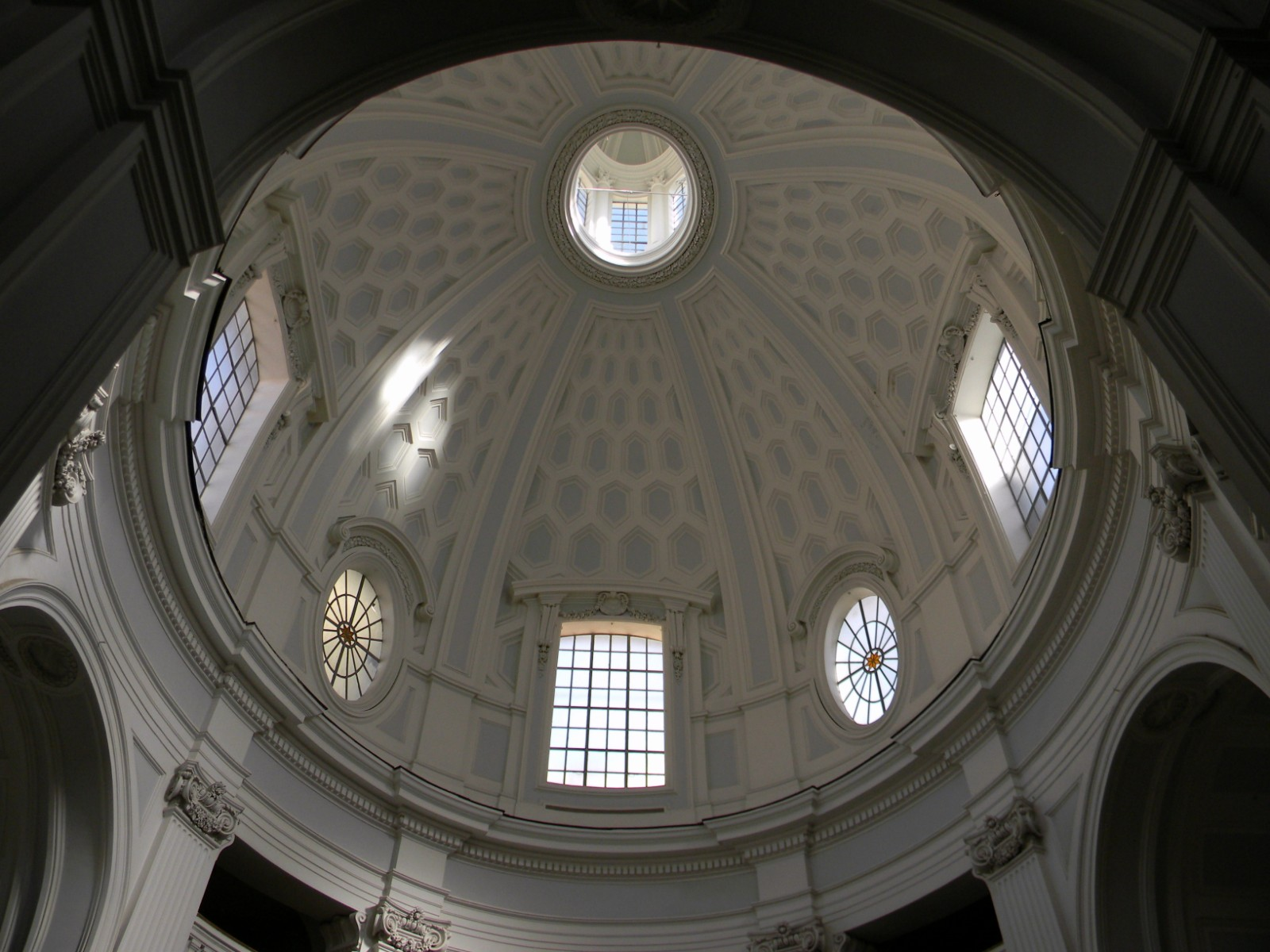
Cupola

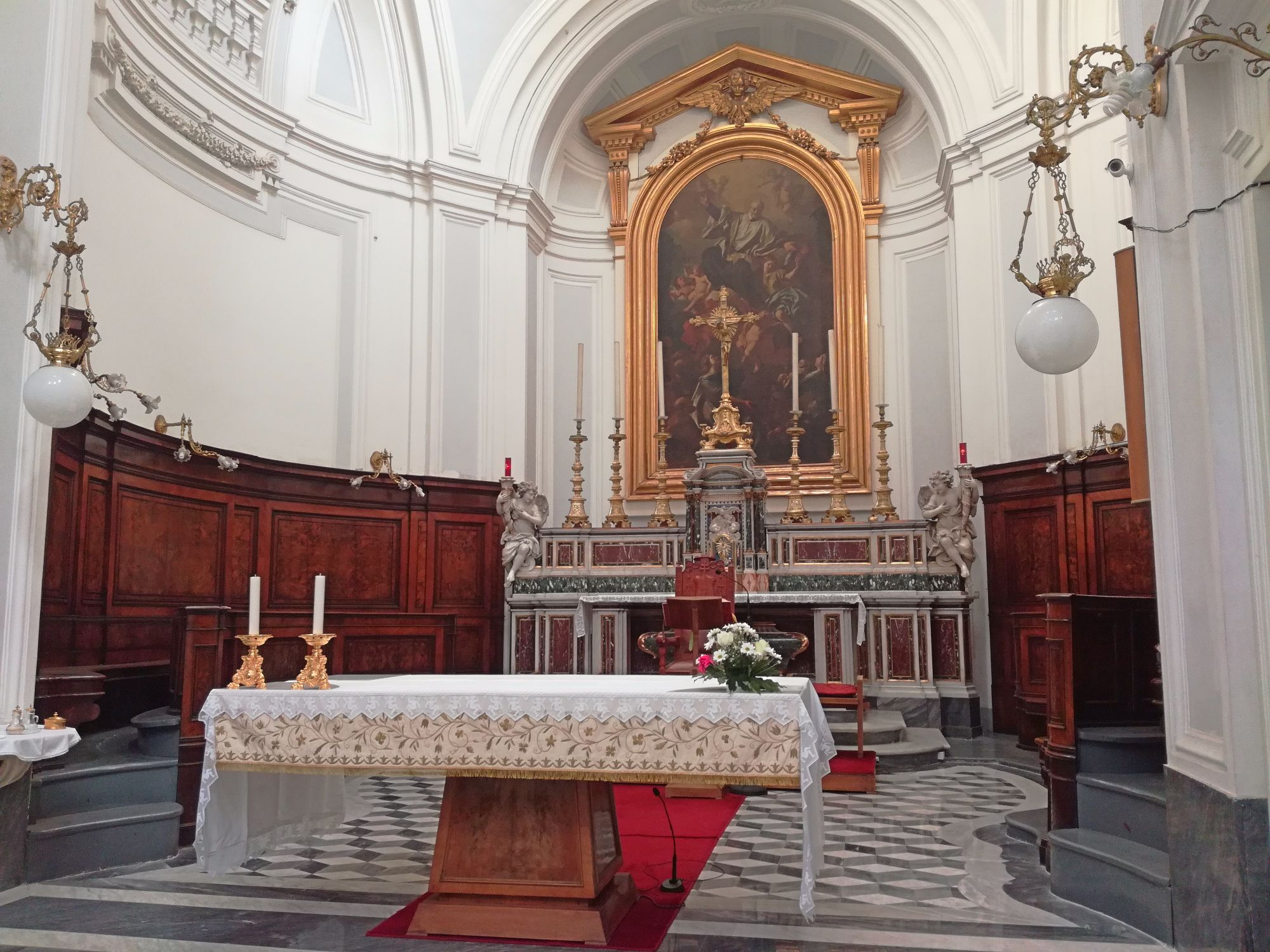
Choir and main altar

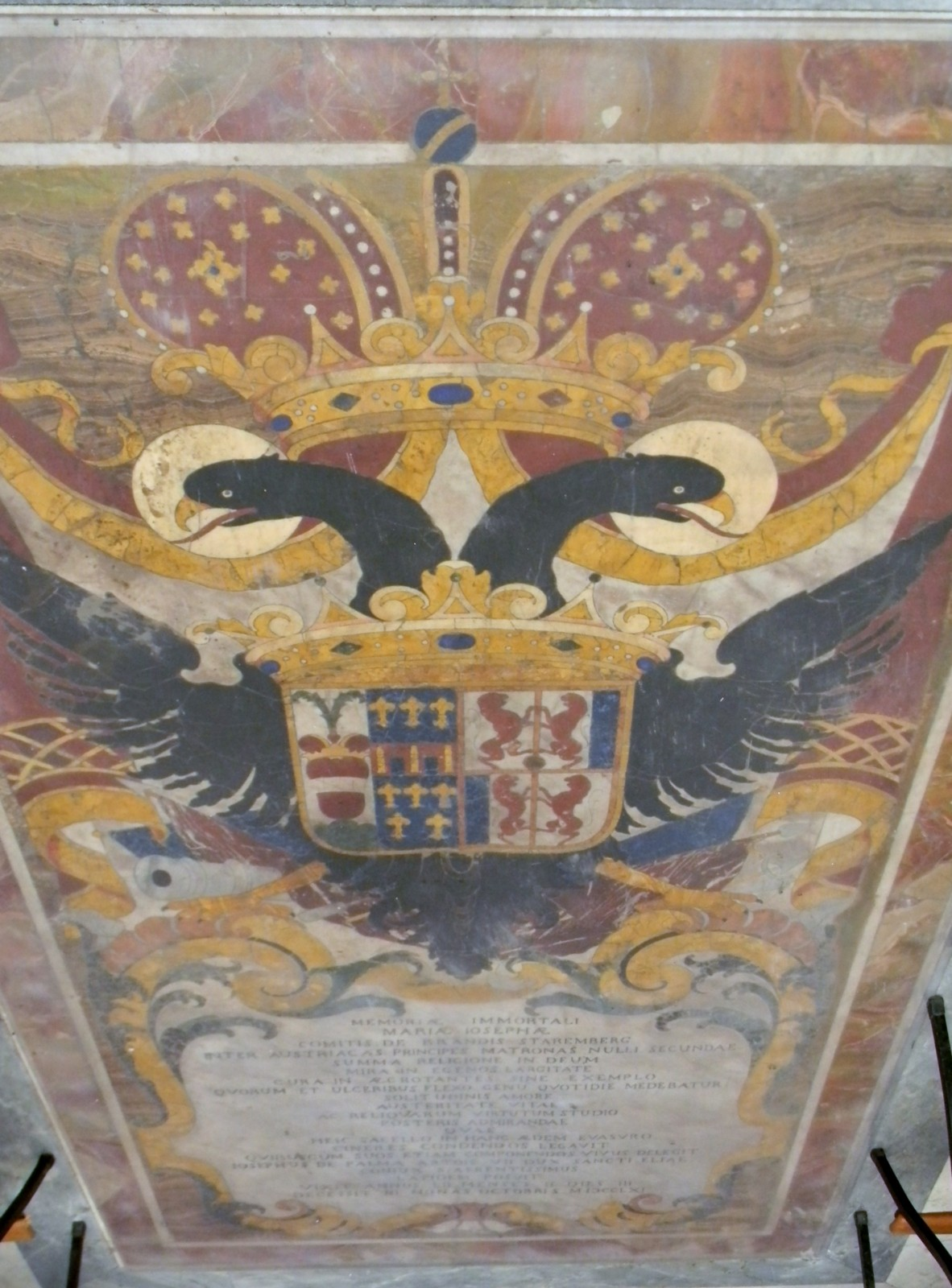
Detail of the paving
