= Domenico Viola =

17th-century Italian painter and draughtsman

- Born: c. 1610–1620; Naples, Italy
- Died: 1696; Naples, Italy

Domenico Viola (c. 1610–1620 – 1696) was an Italian painter and draughtsman who was born and died in Naples. His pupils included Francesco de Mura, whilst his contemporaries in the Accademia di San Luca included Michelangelo Cerquozzi. Many of his paintings are present in the Church of Saint Antonio Abate in Naples.

Artworks by him are in several North American and European art galleries and museums, such as the Smithsonian American Art Museum, and four works by him have been auctioned between 2005 and 2019 (Saint Peter Denies Christ (2004), Nine Men's Morris Players in a Tavern, The Card Players and The Martyrdom of Saint Lawrence)
