= Vincenzo De Mita =

Italian painter (1751–1805)

Vincenzo De Mita (1751 – after 1805) was an Italian painter, mainly depicting sacred subjects.

== Biography ==
He was born in San Severo in the Province of Foggia, and trained under Francesco De Mura in Naples.

He painted a Madonna del Rosario for the Church of the Annunziata in Foggia, now in the civic museum of the city. This work is a copy of a work by Paolo De Matteis found in the Cathedral of Ascoli Satriano.

He painted a Glory of San Nicola di Bari, the Virgin, and the Savior for the Church of Santa Anna di Montemileto in the Province of Avellino. In 1789, he frescoed the access arch to the chapel of the Nativity (2nd to left) of the Church of Gesu Nuovo in Naples. In 1790, he painted a large canvas depicting St Ambrose baptizing St Augustine for the ceiling of the Church of St Augustine in Foggia. For the church of San Giovanni di Dio, he painted four Saints on canvases: St Francis of Paola, St Raphael Archangel, and two others. In 1791, he painted a Crucifixion now in the sacristy of the Church of Santa Maria delle Grazie in Foggia. For the parish church of San Nicola in Castel Cisterna in the Province of Naples, he painted a Last Supper and a Crucifixion (1794), as well as a Madonna with Souls in Purgatory (1788). He also worked in Forino and Morra.

In 1798, he painted a St Lawrence in Glory for the church of the Assunta di Santa Maria di Castellabate, in the Province of Salerno, and a San Nicola and the miracle of the three children.

In 1805 he painted a Last supper for the Church of the Assunta at Frigento in the province of Avellino.
