= Mita Avramov =

Serbian politician

Mita Avramov (Serbian Cyrillic: Мита Аврамов; born 22 August 1952) is a Serbian politician. He has served in the National Assembly of Serbia and the Assembly of Vojvodina and was the mayor of Šid from 2004 to 2008. He was a member of the far-right Serbian Radical Party (SRS) for many years and later joined the Serbian Progressive Party (SNS).

== Early life and career ==
Avramov was born in the village of Mokrin in the municipality of Kikinda, Autonomous Province of Vojvodina, in what was then the People's Republic of Serbia in the Federal People's Republic of Yugoslavia. He is a mechanical technician.

== Politician ==
Avramov appeared in the second position on the Radical Party's electoral list for the Sremska Mitrovica division in the 1996 Yugoslavian parliamentary election. The list won one seat in the division, which went to its lead candidate, Radislav Rosić. Avramov also ran for Šid's second division in the concurrent 1996 Vojvodina provincial election and was defeated.

=== First term in parliament ===
Avramov received the fourth position on the Radical Party's list for Sremska Mitrovica in the 1997 Serbian parliamentary election. The list won four seats, and he was assigned a mandate. (From 1992 to 2000, Serbia's electoral law stipulated that one-third of parliamentary mandates would be assigned to candidates from successful lists in numerical order, while the remaining two-thirds would be distributed amongst other candidates on the lists at the discretion of the sponsoring parties. It was common practice for the latter mandates to be awarded out of order. Avramov did not automatically receive a mandate by virtue of his list position.) The Radical Party won eighty-two seats in total, finishing second against the governing Socialist Party of Serbia (SPS). The SPS formed a new coalition government with the SRS and the Yugoslav Left (JUL) in March 1998, and Avramov served as a supporter of the administration. He was one of several Serbian officials placed under sanction by European Union countries in March 2000, in the aftermath of the Kosovo War and the NATO bombing of Yugoslavia.

SPS leader Slobodan Milošević was defeated by Democratic Opposition of Serbia candidate Vojislav Koštunica in the 2000 Yugoslavian presidential election, a watershed moment in Serbian and Yugoslavian politics. The Serbian government fell, and the Radicals moved into opposition in the Serbian assembly. Avramov ran unsuccessfully for Šid's first division in the 2000 Vojvodina provincial election and for Šid's twenty-seventh division in the 2000 Serbian local elections, both of which were held concurrently with the Yugoslavian vote.

Serbia held a new parliamentary election in December 2000. Its electoral laws were reformed prior to the vote, such that the entire country became a single electoral division and all mandates were awarded to candidates on successful lists at the discretion of the sponsoring parties or coalitions, irrespective of numerical order. Avramov appeared in the seventy-ninth position on the SRS list and did not receive a new mandate when the party fell to twenty-three seats.

=== 2003–2012 ===
Avramov was given the eightieth position on the Radical Party's list in the 2003 Serbian parliamentary election. The party won eighty-two seats; he was not initially included in its assembly delegation but received a new mandate on 17 February 2004 as the replacement for another member. Although the SRS won more seats than any other party in the 2003 election, it fell short of a majority and ultimately served in opposition. Avramov served on the committee for industry and the committee for petitions and proposals.

Serbia introduced the direct election of mayors in the 2004 Serbian local elections. Avramov ran for mayor of Šid and was elected in the second round of voting. He was also elected to Vojvodina assembly for Šid in the concurrent 2004 provincial election. The Democratic Party (DS) and its allies formed government at the provincial level, and the Radicals served in opposition.

Avramov received the forty-ninth position on the SRS's list in the 2007 parliamentary election. The party won eighty-one seats, but he was not given a seat in the new legislature. He appeared in the 114th position in the 2008 parliamentary election and again did not receive a mandate when the list won seventy-eight seats.

The direct election of mayors proved to be a short-lived experiment, and since 2008 mayors have been chosen by the elected members of the local assemblies. Avramov led the Radical Party's list for Šid in the 2008 local elections; the party won thirteen seats, finishing second against the Democratic Party, and he served in opposition for the four-year term that followed. He was defeated in the 2008 Vojvodina provincial election.

The Radical Party experienced a serious split in late 2008, with several members joining the more moderate Serbian Progressive Party under the leadership of Tomislav Nikolić and Aleksandar Vučić. Avramov initially remained with the Radicals. In October 2008, he was accused by the local G17 Plus board of illegally dismissing municipal workers affiliated with other parties during his time as mayor.

=== Since 2012 ===
Serbia's electoral laws were reformed in 2011, such that mandates were awarded to candidates on successful lists in numerical order. Avramov received the sixty-second position on the Radical Party's list in the 2012 Serbian parliamentary election. The list did not cross the electoral threshold for representation in the assembly.

Avramov later joined the Progressive Party, which won a majority victory in Šid in the 2016 Serbian local elections. He was appointed to the municipal council (i.e., the executive branch of the municipal government) after the election and served for the next four years.

== Electoral record ==
=== Provincial (Vojvodina) ===
2008 Vojvodina provincial election: Šid
Candidate	Party	First round		Second round	
Candidate	Party	Votes	%	Votes	%
Dušan Petko	Democratic Party–G17 Plus (Affiliation: Democratic Party)	4,156	22.85	6,470	62.38
Mita Avramov	Serbian Radical Party	5,840	32.11	3,902	37.62
Zoran Semenović	Democratic Party of Serbia	2,940	16.17		
Jovan Matijević	Coalition: Socialist Party of Serbia (SPS)–Party of United Pensioners of Serbia (PUPS) (Affiliation: Socialist Party of Serbia)	2,285	12.56		
Zvonko Hnatko	Coalition: "Together for Vojvodina–Nenad Čanak (Affiliation: League of Social Democrats of Vojvodina)	2,247	12.35		
Slobodan Filipović	Liberal Democratic Party	719	3.95		
Total		18,187	100.00	10,372	100.00
Valid votes		18,187	94.55	10,372	95.99
Invalid/blank votes		1,048	5.45	433	4.01
Total votes		19,235	100.00	10,805	100.00

2004 Vojvodina provincial election: Šid
Candidate	Party	First round		Second round	
Candidate	Party	Votes	%	Votes	%
Mita Avramov	Serbian Radical Party	5,840		5,626	54.85
Josip Logarušić	Citizens' Group: Healthy Serbia–Movement for Šid			4,631	45.15
Marko Bajić	Socialist People's Party				
Dragan Ilić	Strength of Serbia Movement				
Zdravko Kulačanin	Socialist Party of Serbia				
Zoran Lukić	Coalition: Democratic Party–Boris Tadić				
Srđan Malešević	Democratic Party of Serbia				
Prof. Dr. Đorđe Marković	G17 Plus				
Nebojša Nešković (incumbent)	Coalition: Together for Šid (SPO–NSS) (Affiliation: People's Peasant Party)				
Pavle Čukarić	Coalition: Together for Vojvodina–Nenad Čanak				
Total				10,257	100.00
Valid votes				10,257	96.16
Invalid/blank votes				410	3.84
Total votes				10,667	100.00
Source: This source does not provide the first-round vote totals.

2000 Vojvodina provincial election: Šid Division 1
Candidate	Party
Nebojša Nešković (***WINNER***)	Democratic Opposition of Serbia (Affiliation: People's Peasant Party)
Mita Avramov	Serbian Radical Party
other candidates	
Total

1996 Vojvodina provincial election: Šid Division 2
Candidate	Party
Petar Arsenović (incumbent) (***WINNER***)	Socialist Party of Serbia
Mita Avramov	Serbian Radical Party
other candidates	
Total

=== Local (Šid) ===
2004 Municipality of Šid local election: Mayor of Šid
Candidate	Party	First round		Second round	
Candidate	Party	Votes	%	Votes	%
Mita Avramov	Serbian Radical Party			5,323	51.17
Ljubomir Valentirović	Citizens' Group			5,079	48.83
other candidates					
Total				10,402	100.00

2000 Municipal of Šid local election: Division 27
Candidate	Party
Mita Avramov (DEFEATED)	Serbian Radical Party
other candidates	
Total
