= Mita Dasog =

Canadian chemist

- Born: Mita Dasog; Saskatoon, Canada
- Education: University of Saskatchewan (BS); University of Alberta (PhD)
- Scientific career
- Fields: Materials Science; Renewable Energy

Mita Dasog is a professor at Dalhousie University in Nova Scotia, Canada. She has received the Emerging Professional Award, the Canadian Council of University Chemistry Chairs Doctoral Award, is a “Top 25” Global Young Scientist in Sustainable Research, and is one of the top 150 women in STEM for her outreach efforts with youth and young women.

== Early life and education ==
Mita Dasog was born in Saskatoon, Saskatchewan. Her family left Canada to return to her parents' home country of India, but she returned to Saskatoon to start university. She received her BSc with high honours in 2009 from the University of Saskatchewan. She then continued her studies by completing a PhD at the University of Alberta where her work focused on the synthesis, properties, and applications of silicon quantum dots. Her research is specifically focused on developing sustainable silicon products in order to make computers and cell-phones more environmentally friendly. Her work was recognized by the Canadian Council of University Chemistry Chairs when she received the Doctoral Award in 2015 for exceptional doctoral research in Canada.

After completing her PhD, Dasog studied carbon dioxide sequestration as a working scholar at the Technical University of Munich. Next, she held an NSERC postdoctoral position at the California Institute of Technology where she investigated light-material interactions and engineered semiconductor-liquid interfaces through surface chemistry. Most recently, Dasog has joined the Department of Chemistry at Dalhousie University as an assistant professor.

== Research interests ==
Mita Dasog’s independent research focuses on nanomaterials, solar energy, catalysis, plasmonics, inorganic chemistry, and solid-state chemistry. More specifically her work in catalysis focuses on photocatalysis and electrocatalysis.

Photocatalysis allows for the harvesting of solar energy to make chemical fuels, can help to degrade environmental contaminants, and can be used for disinfection. The focus of Dasog's group is on developing photocatalysts that are composed of earth-abundant elements and can absorb into the near-IR region. They engineer the morphology, porosity, crystallinity, and 3D nanostructuring of the photocatalyst nanoparticles to enhance carrier collection and improve the overall efficiency of a chemical reaction.

Electrocatalysis provides a means to produce energy, fuels, and chemicals. Their group works to develop active, stable, and inexpensive electrocatalysts for hydrogen production, water oxidation, and ammonia generation. These reactions are driven using energy obtained from renewable resources. As well, their group works to convert industrial waste byproducts into electrocatalysts by designing solid-state reactions that allow precise control over the consumption and morphology of the catalyst.

== Outreach work ==
Since starting her position at Dalhousie University, Dasog has ensured that her lab group is actively involved in science outreach activities. In addition to hosting several speaking events for schools and the public, Dasog's group has previously organized a dye-sensitized solar cell workshop as part of the 2018 National Chemistry week. The group has further participated in both the 2018 Halifax STEMFest (where renewable energy technologies were discussed with high-school students) and the 2019 Techsploration Alumni Conference at the Nova Scotia Community College.

== Awards/honors ==
Dasog’s most recent awards and honors include:

- 2019: President’s Emerging Investigator Research Excellence Award, 2019
- 2020: Member of the Global Young Academy, 2020
- 2020: Nova Scotia Discovery Centre Emerging Professional Award, 2020
- 2021: Member of the College of the Royal Society Canada
- 2021: Izaak Walton Killam Memorial Research Chair, 2021

== Publications ==
Some examples of Dasog’s notable catalyst-focused publications include:

- Photocatalytic Hydrogen Generation using Mesoporous Silicon Nanoparticles: Influence of Magnesiothermic Reduction Conditions and Nanoparticle Aging on the Catalytic Activity
- Highly Efficient, Biochar-derived Molybdenum Carbide Hydrogen Evolution Electrocatalyst
- Plasmon-Enhanced Photocatalytic Nitrogen Reduction to Ammonia
