= Mita Dōri =

Avenue in Minato, Tokyo, Japan

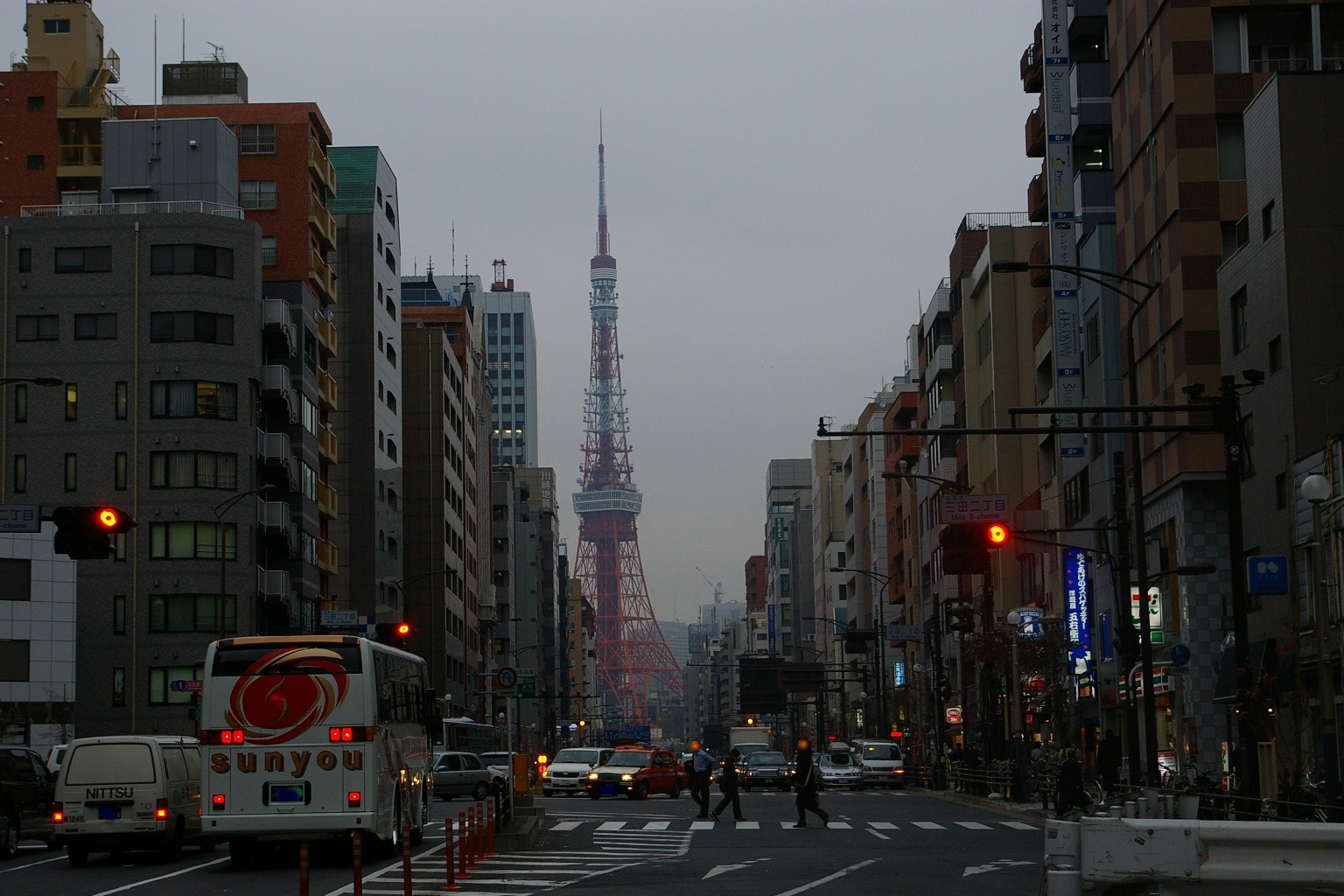
Mita Dōri as seen from Fuda no tsuji.

Mita Dōri (三田通り) is a four lane avenue which forms the border between Mita 2-chōme and Shiba 5-chōme in Minato, Tokyo, Japan. Formerly occupied by a shopping center, a large number of office buildings and condominiums are now found there. Tokyo Tower is a northern extension of Mita-dori, and it can be seen from anywhere along Mita Dōri. Along the west side of the road is Saisekai Central Hospital (済生会中央病院, Saiseikai Chūō Byōin), the Mita International Building, and Keio University. Mita Library, the Mita Police Station, and Fushimi Sanpō Inari Shrine are found along the east side.

== Secondary roads ==
=== Keio Nakadori Shoutengai ===
Keio Nakadori Shoutengai is a commercial avenue exist in Shiba 5-chome in the Minato ward. There are many shops between Mita-dori and Tamachi station; its width is about 3 meters.

== Gallery ==
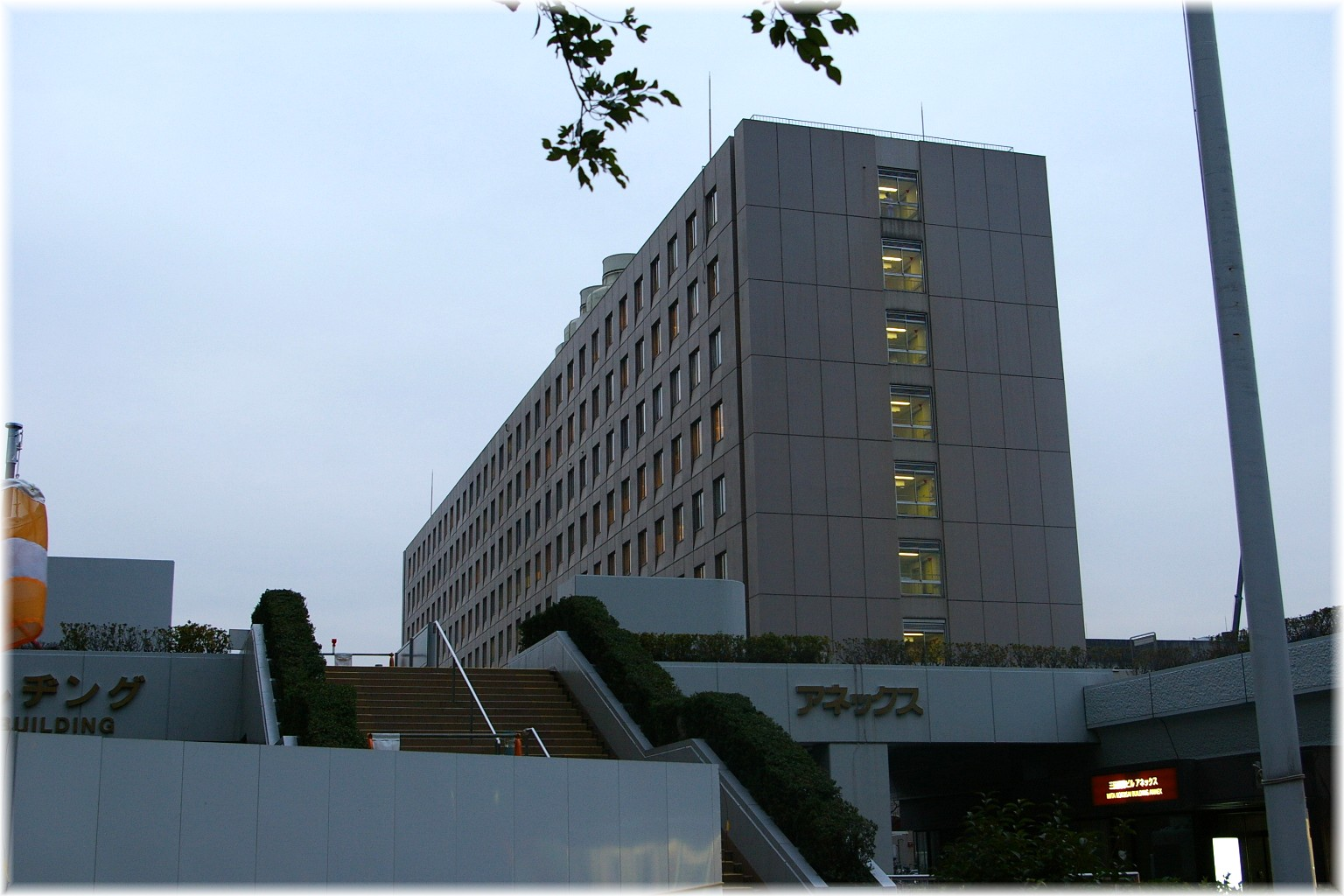
Saiseikai Central Hospital

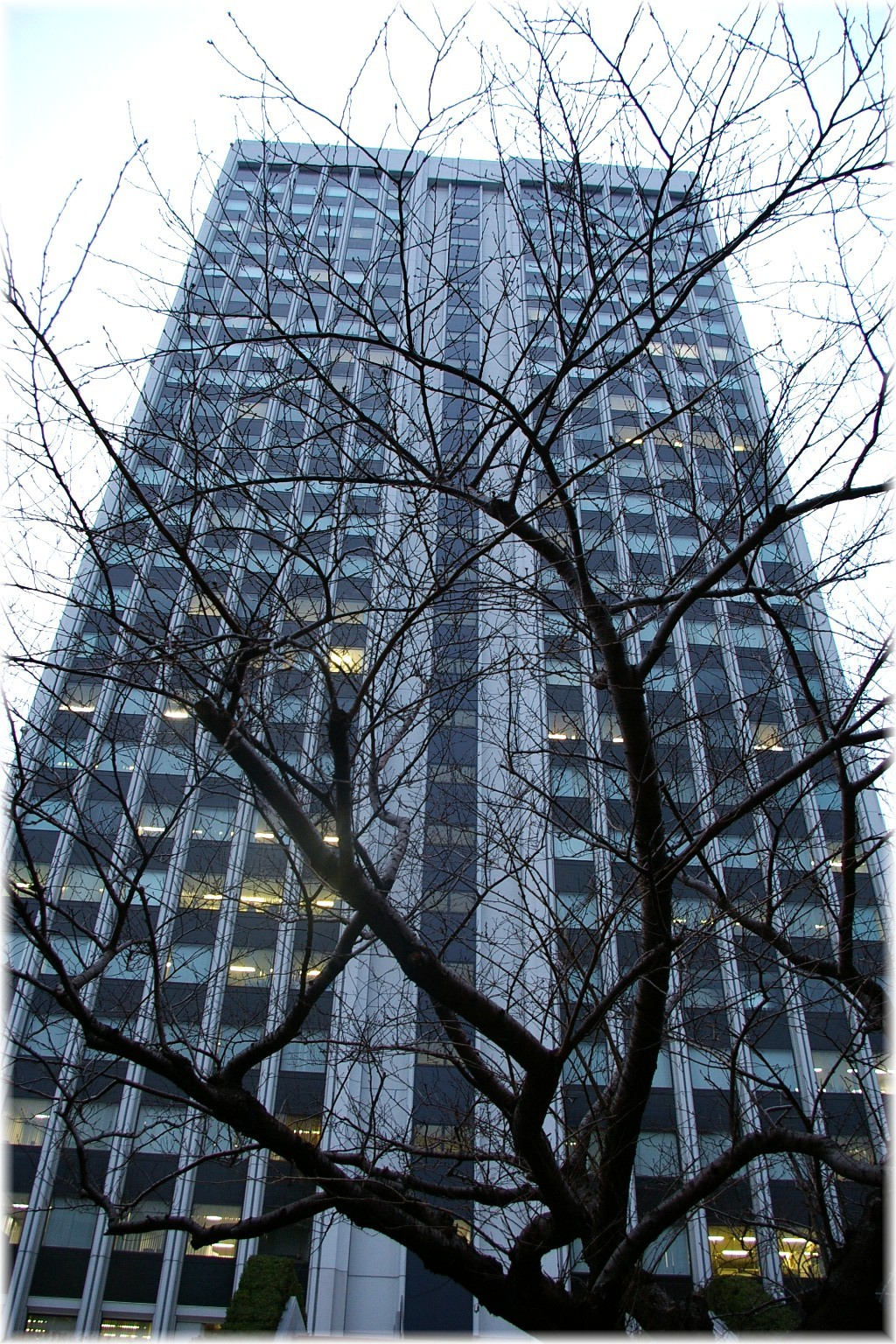
Mita International building

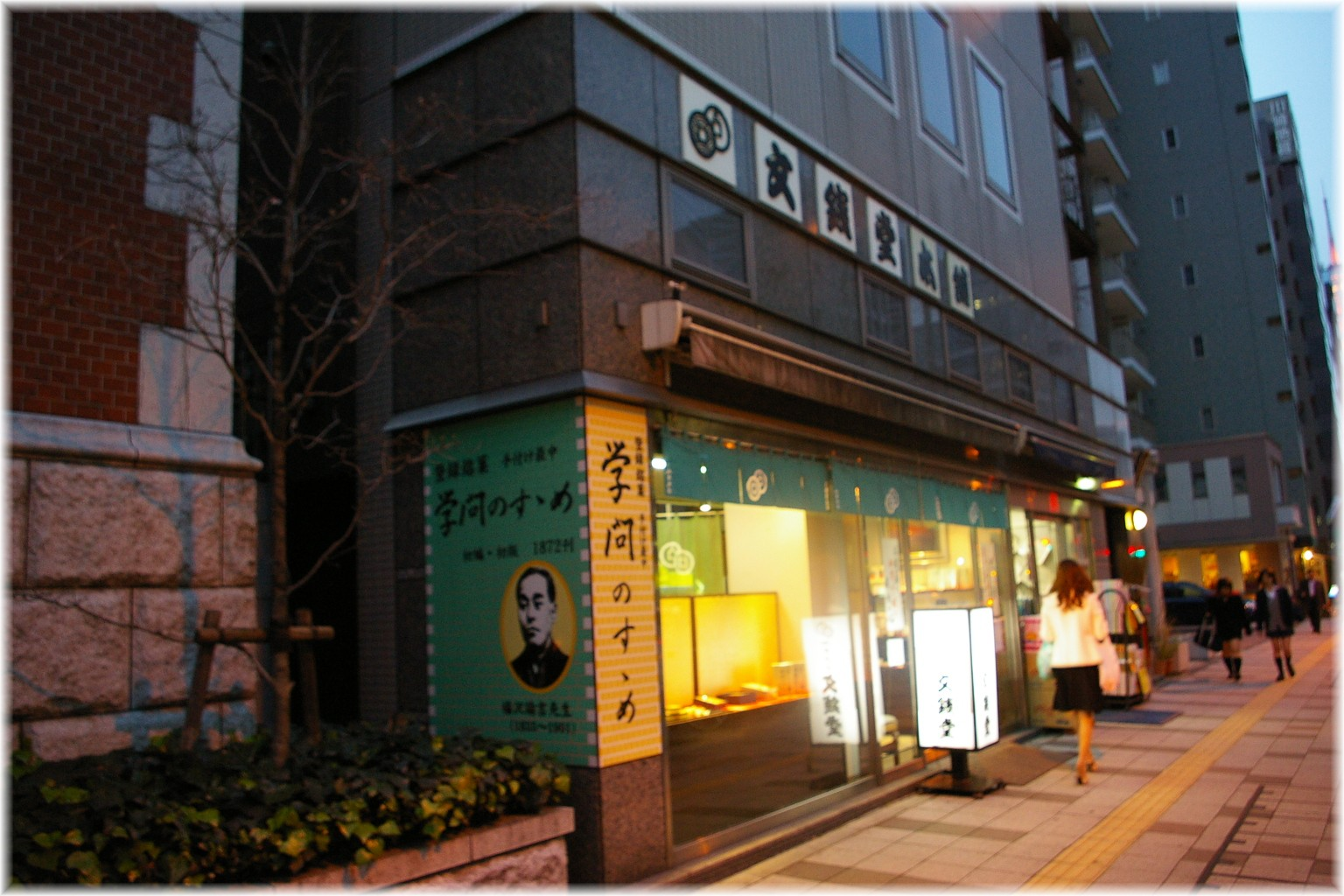
Bunsendō main store

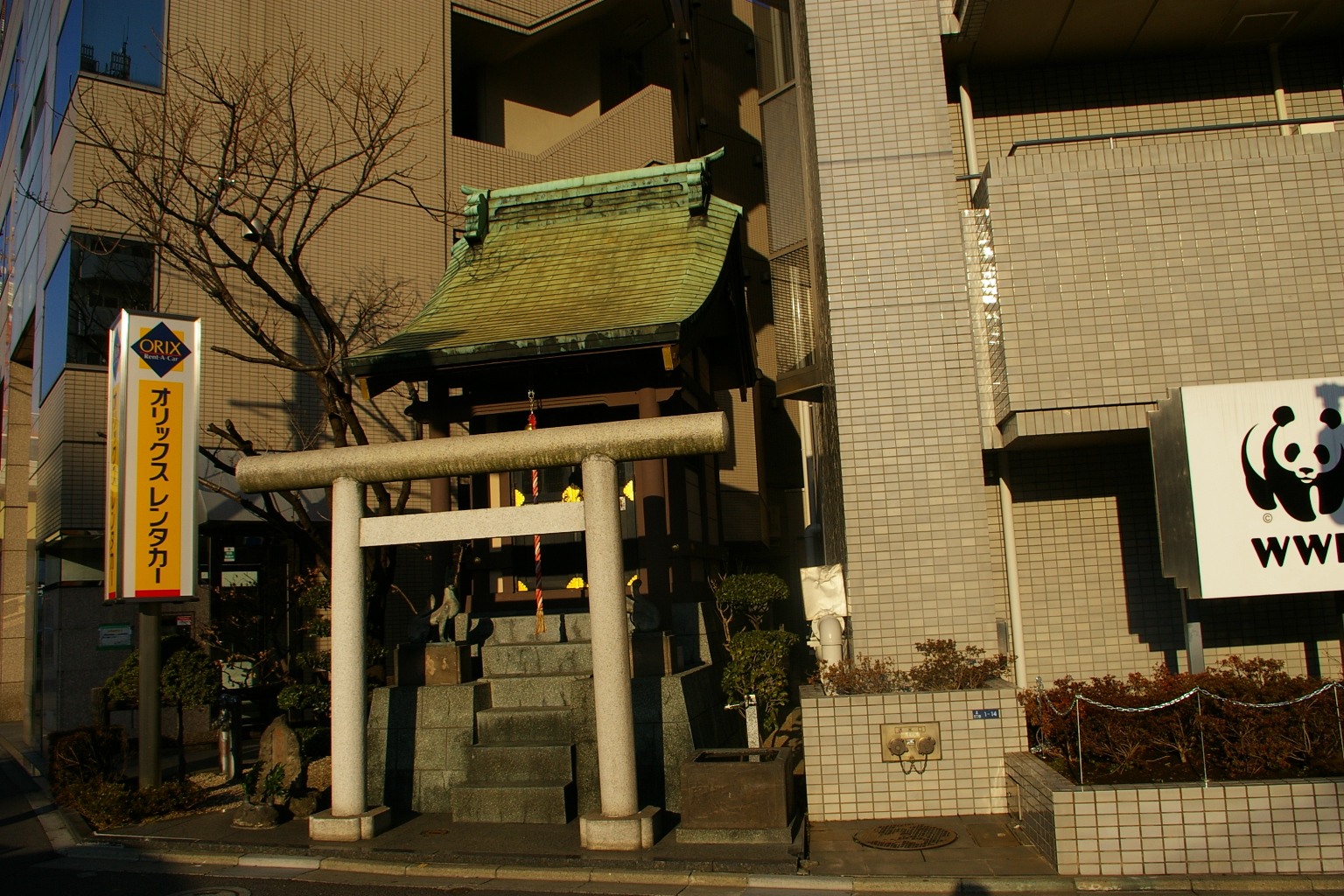
Fushimi Sanpō Inari Shrine
