= Doubting Thomas (disambiguation) =

A doubting Thomas is a skeptic who refuses to believe without direct personal experience.

Doubting Thomas may also refer to:

== People and fictional characters ==
- Thomas the Apostle, apostle of Jesus, basis of the skeptic
- Thomas (activist) (1947–2009), "Doubting" Thomas, anti-nuclear and anti-war activist
- Doubting Thomas, a pal of Lord Snooty

== Art ==
- The Incredulity of Saint Thomas, a painting by Caravaggio
- The Incredulity of Saint Thomas, a triptych painting by Peter Paul Rubens
- The Incredulity of Saint Thomas, a painting by Francesco Salviati
- The Incredulity of Saint Thomas, a painting by Matthias Stom
- Christ and St. Thomas, a bronze statue by Andrea del Verrocchio
- Doubting Thomas (The Incredulity of St. Thomas), a painting by Adriaen van der Werff formerly in the Hope Collection of Pictures

== Film and television ==
- Doubting Thomas (1935 film), an American comedy film
- Spy School, aka Doubting Thomas, a 2008 children's film
- Doubting Thomas (2018 film), an American drama film
- "Doubting Thomas" (Surgical Spirit), a 1990 television episode

== Literature ==
- Doubting Thomas, a book by Morris Gleitzman

== Music ==
- Doubting Thomas (band), a side project of Canadian group Skinny Puppy
- Doubting Thomas (Charlotte band)
- "Doubting Thomas", a song from Why Should the Fire Die?
