= Salome Receives the Head of John the Baptist =

Painting by Matthias Stom

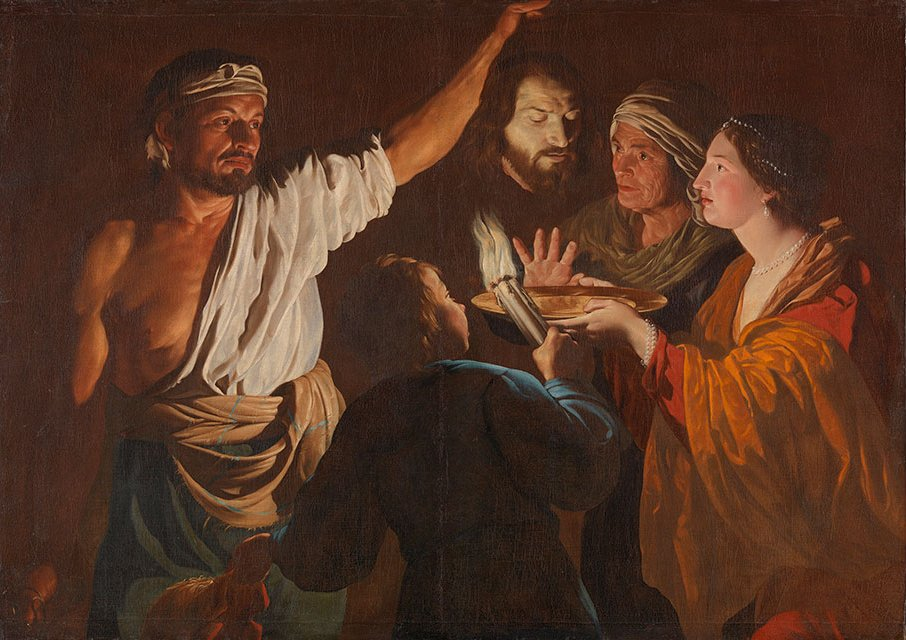
- Artist: Matthias Stom
- Year: c. 1630-1632
- Medium: Oil on canvas
- Dimensions: 109.2 cm × 155.7 cm (43.0 in × 61.3 in)
- Location: National Gallery; London

Salome Receives the Head of John the Baptist is an oil on canvas painting by Dutch artist Matthias Stom, probably painted around 1630–1632 in Rome. It is now held in the National Gallery, in London, to which it was presented by the Trustees of Sir Denis Mahon's Charitable Trust via the Art Fund in 2013.

== See also ==
- List of paintings by Matthias Stom
