= The Judgement of Solomon (Stom, Manchester, New Hampshire) =

Painting by Matthias Stom

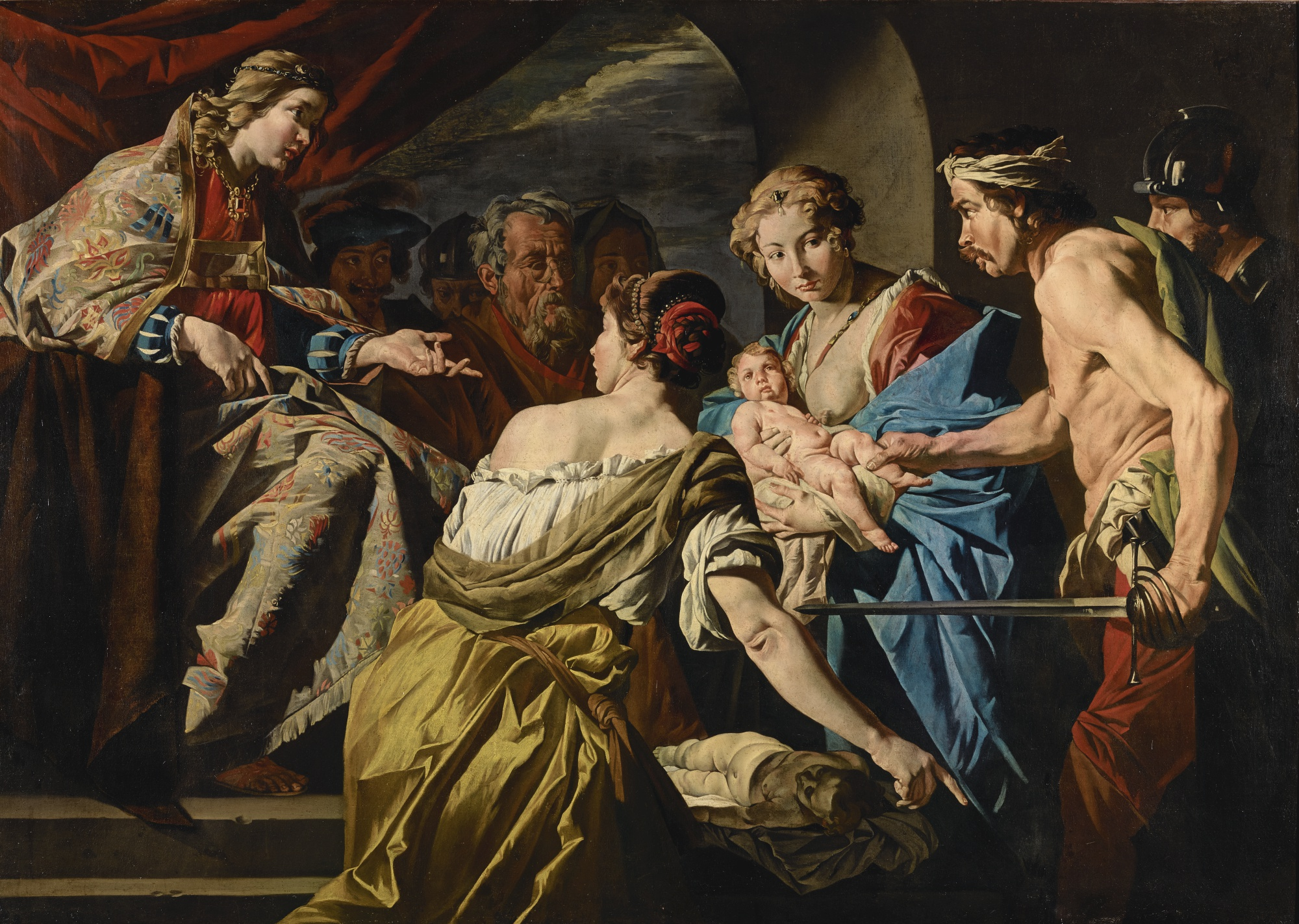
- Artist: Matthias Stom
- Year: c. 1640
- Medium: Oil on canvas
- Dimensions: 222 cm × 157 cm (87 in × 62 in)
- Location: Currier Museum of Art; Manchester, New Hampshire

The Judgement of Solomon is an oil on canvas painting by Matthias Stom, created c. 1640. It is a depiction of the Judgement of Solomon. It is held in the Currier Museum of Art, in Manchester, New Hampshire, which purchased it from the J.E. Safra collection at Sotheby's on 5 July 2017 for £428,750.

== History ==
Its palette, style and drapery are similar to other works painted by the artist while on Sicily such as The Stoning of St Stephen, now in the Palazzo Alliata Villafranca in Palermo - the artist settled on the island around 1640.

It is thought to have been painted on Sicily where he painted most of his works. A work on the subject features in the inventory of Don Giuseppe Branciforte, Principe di Butera's collection in a 1675 inventory with four other works by Stom and had been thought to have been another version of Stom's The Judgement of Solomon now in Houston until the Manchester work's reappearance on the art market in a 1991 auction, which led to a re-dating of the Houston work to his time in Naples in the 1630s and an identification of the Manchester work as the work from the Branciforte inventory.

== See also ==
- List of paintings by Matthias Stom
