= Dune 1 =

Dune 1 or Dune I, may refer to:

- Dune (novel), a 1965 science fiction novel by Frank Herbert, first in the Dune series
- Dune (video game), a 1992 science fiction video game, also called "Dune I", predecessor to 1993's Dune II
- Dune: Part One, a 2021 American science fiction film directed by Denis Villeneuve, predecessor to 2024's Dune: Part Two
- "Dune I" (song), a 1994 tune by Bill Carroll (musician) from the album Kohoutek

== See also ==
- Frank Herbert's Dune, a 2000 American TV science fiction miniseries from the Syfy network
- Dune (disambiguation)
