= List of paintings by Matthias Stom =

This page is a list of paintings by the Dutch, or possibly Flemish, painter Matthias Stom.

== Sicily ==
=== Province of Caltanissetta ===
- 17th century, cycle of paintings recorded inside the Palazzo Branciforti in Mazzarino.

=== Province of Catania ===
==== Catania ====
From the Giovan Battista Finocchiaro collection in the Museo civico al Castello Ursino:

- Death of Cato
- Suicide of Seneca
- Death of Brutus
- Crucifixion of St Peter
- Tobias Healing his Blind Father
- Christ Mocked (I)
- Christ Mocked (II)

==== Linguaglossa ====
- oil on canvas recorded in the Dominican 'aggregato'

=== Province of Messina ===
==== Messina ====
- 1646 – 1649, Scaevola before Lars Porsena, Museo regionale di Messina.
- 1646 – 1649, Adoration of the Shepherds, Museo Regionale di Messina.
- 1646 – 1649, St Cecilia, recorded in the city's Capuchin monastery church.

==== Other ====
- 1646 – 1649, Flagellation, museo civico polivalente «Egidio Ortolani» in Mistretta.

=== Province of Palermo ===
==== Caccamo ====
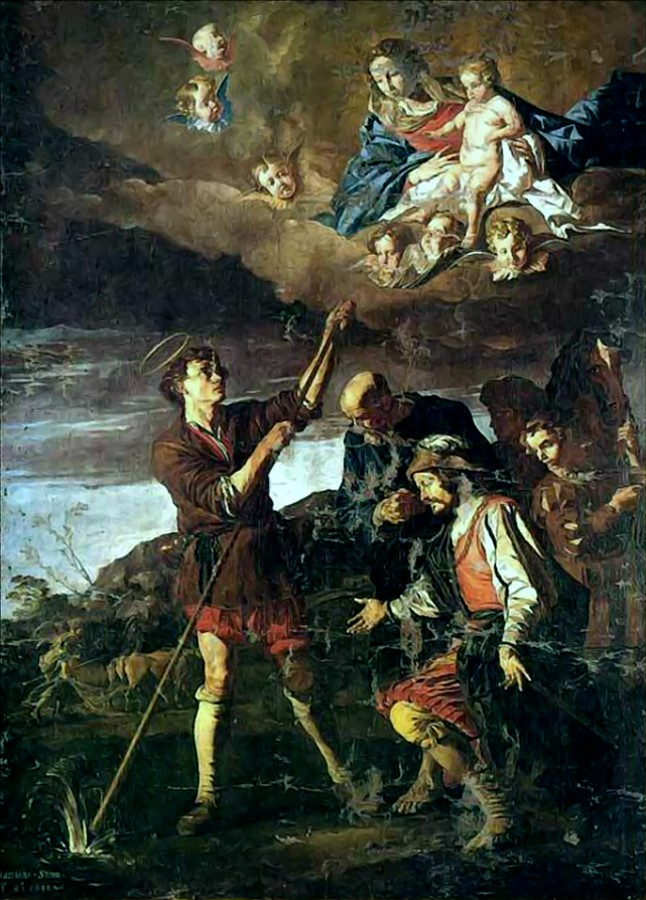
Miracle of St Isidore the Laborer, duomo di San Giorgio Martire in Caccamo.

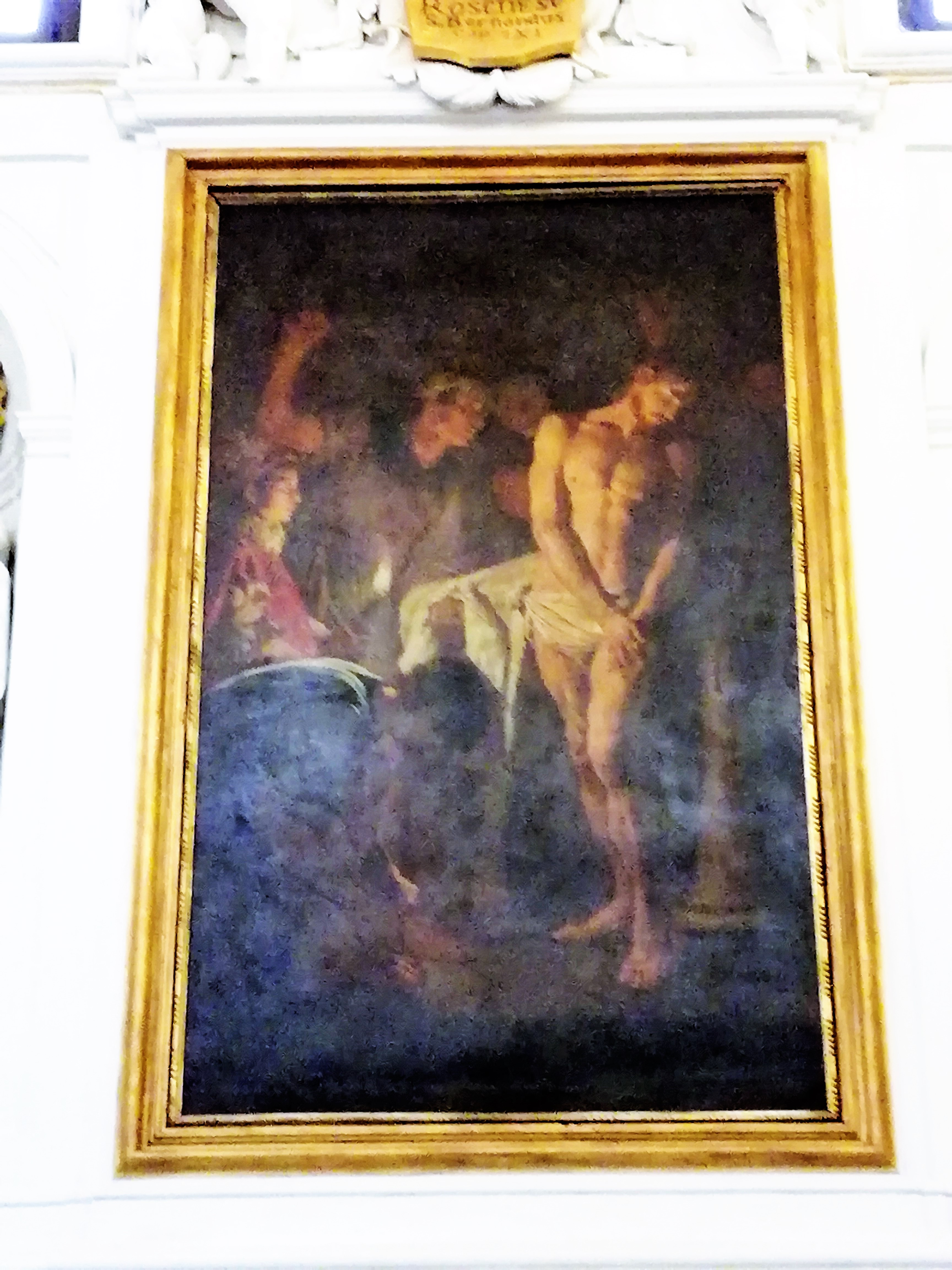
Flagellation, Oratorio del Santissimo Rosario di San Domenico.

- 1641, Miracle of St Isidore the Laborer, oil on canvas, originally in the church of Sant'Agostino, stolen and recovered, now in the duomo di San Giorgio Martire.

==== Palermo ====
- 1638 – 1639, Flagellation, Oratorio del Rosario di San Domenico.
- c. 1638 – 1639, Christ Crowned with Thorns, attributed, Oratorio del Rosario di San Domenico.
- 1639, The Stoning of St Stephen, oil on canvas, palazzo Alliata di Villafranca.
- 1639, The Tribute Money or Miracle of the Tribute Money, oil on canvas, commissioned for the palazzo Alliata di Villafranca and recorded in the seminario arcivescovile.
- 1646 – 1649, Man Blowing on an Ember, recorded in the Ruffo collection in Messina, now in the Galleria Regionale in palazzo Abatellis.
- Christ with the Doctors in the Temple and Jacob and Esau, recorded in Antonio Lucchesi-Palli's collection in Palazzo Campofranco.

==== Monreale ====
- 1640 – 1650, Last Supper, recorded in the sacristy of the basilica abbaziale di San Martino delle Scale.
- 1646, Adoration of the Shepherds, commissioned and recorded in the Capuchin monastery church, now in the city's palazzo.
- 17th century, St Dominic of Silos, recorded in the collegiate church of Santissimo Salvatore.

=== Province unknown ===
- c. 1635, Isaac Blessing Jacob

== Rest of Italy ==
- Christ Disputing with the Doctors in the Temple, oil on canvas, commissioned by Battistello Caracciolo, inherited and moved to Carafa, sold at auction. Version sold at Sotheby's New York.

=== Bergamo ===
- Assumption of the Virgin with St Sebastian, St Charles Borromeo and Saint Roch, church of Santa Maria Assunta in Chiuduno.

=== Liguria ===
==== Genoa ====
- Salome with the Head of John the Baptist and Death of Cato, Palazzo Bianco in Genoa.

=== Lombardy ===
- Last Judgement, pieve di Santa Maria Assunta in Soncino.

=== Marche ===
- Burning of the Palazzo Ducale in Venice, Santissime Braccia Chapel in the basilica di San Nicola da Tolentino in Tolentino.

=== Naples ===
==== Capodimonte ====
- Adoration of the Shepherds
- Death of Seneca
- Supper at Emmaus

==== Other ====
- Flagellation, oil on canvas, chiesa di Sant'Eframo Nuovo dedicata alla «Santissima Concezione».
- Crucifixion with Angels, oil on canvas, chiesa di Sant'Eframo Nuovo dedicata alla «Santissima Concezione».
- Saint Onuphrius, Quadreria dei Girolamini.
- Adoration of the Shepherds, oil on canvas, Museo civico Gaetano Filangieri.
- Adoration of the Shepherds, St Catherine of Siena chapel, basilica di San Domenico Maggiore.

=== Piedmont ===
==== Turin ====
- Adoration of the Shepherds, oil on canvas, Palazzo Reale
- Samson Arrested, Pinacoteca Reale of the Galleria Sabauda

=== Rome ===
- 1630, Sampson and Delilah, oil on canvas, Gallerie nazionali d'arte antica, Palazzo Barberini
- 1632 – 1633, Beheading of St John the Baptist, oil on canvas Gallerie nazionali d'arte antica, Palazzo Barberini.
- Jesus Arrested, Galleria Spada

=== Tuscany ===
==== Florence ====
- Annunciation, produced in Naples, acquired by the Uffizi

== Malta ==
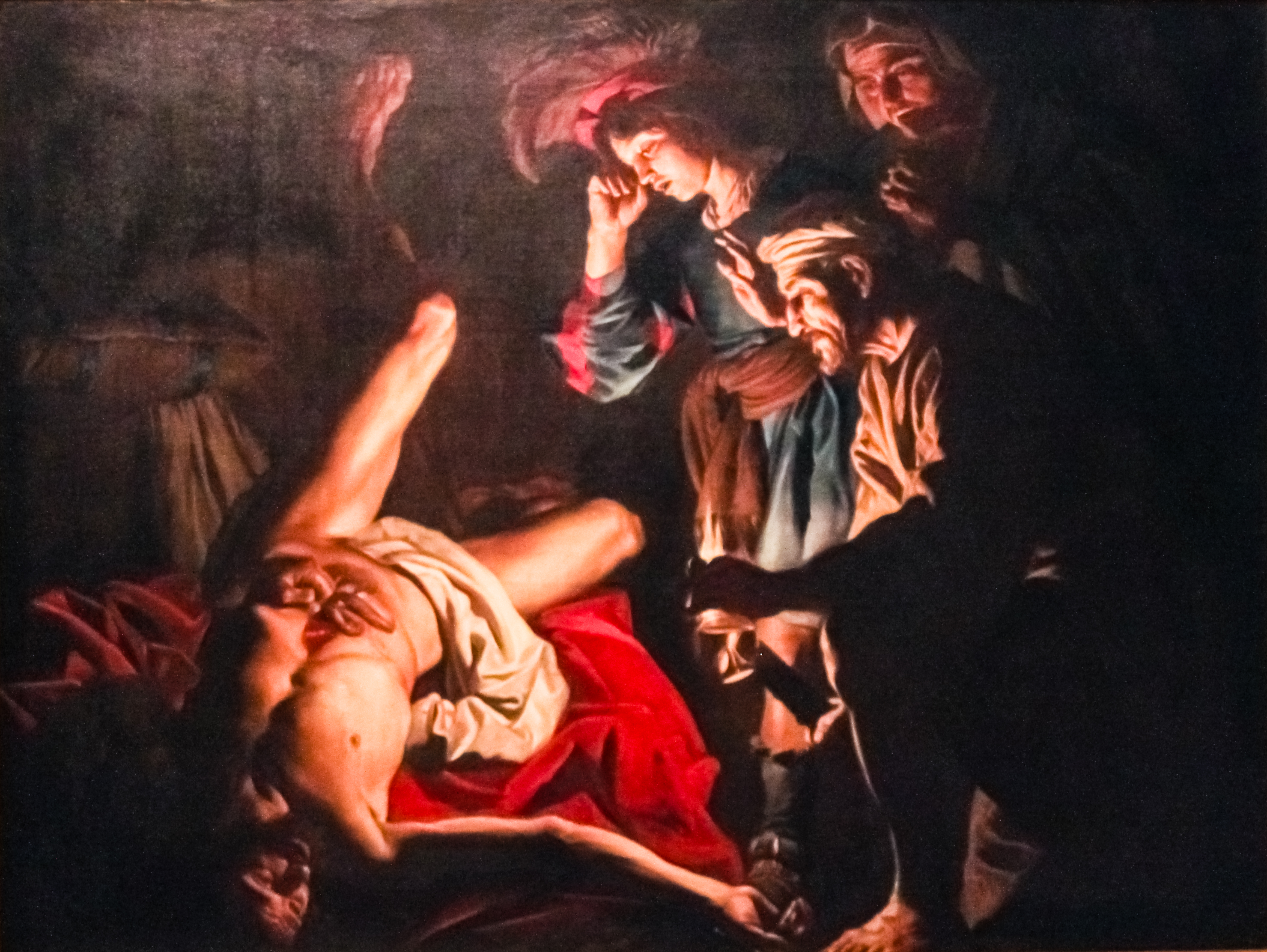
Death of Cato, MUŻA, La Valletta.

- Death of Cato, MUŻA, La Valletta.

== France ==
- Pilate Washing His Hands, c. 1650 and Isaac blessing Jacob, Musée du Louvre, Paris
- Saint Ambrose, 1633–1639, Saint John and Saint Mark, Musee des Beaux-Arts de Rennes
- Saint Jerome and Adoration of the Shepherds, Musee des Beaux-Arts de Nantes
- Supper at Emmaus and Avarice, Grenoble Museum
- Adoration of the Magi, Musee des Augustins, Toulouse
- Adoration of the Magi, Musee des Beaux-Arts de Rouen
- King David, Musee des Beaux-Arts de Marseille
- Sarah presented by Agar to Abraham, Musée Condé, Chantilly.
- Sacrifice of Isaac, Musée Fesch, Ajaccio
- The Good Samaritan, Musée des Hospices civils de Lyon
- Jesus and Nicodemus, Dax Cathedral

== Spain ==
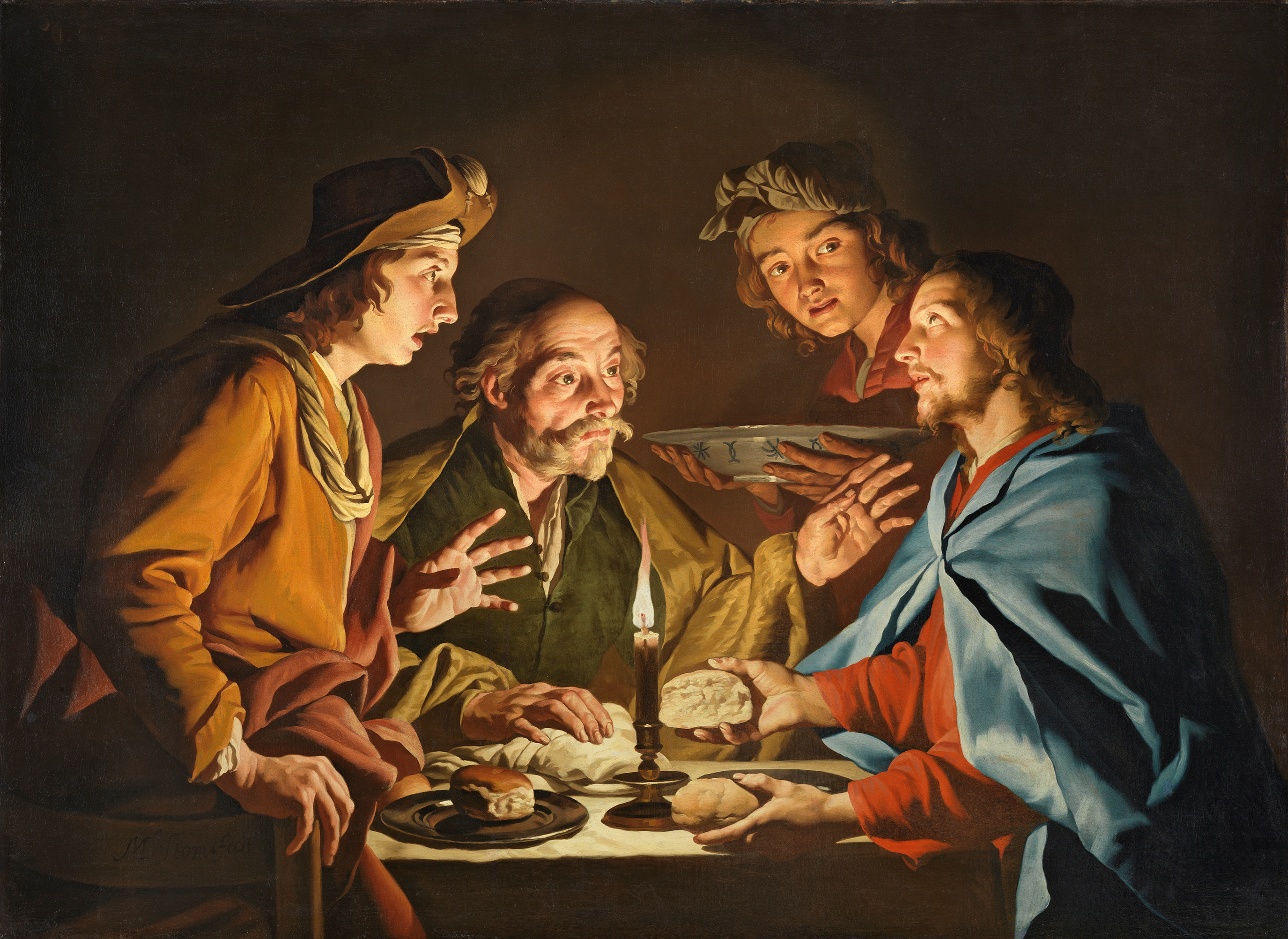
The Supper at Emmaus, Thyssen-Bornemisza Museum.

- The Incredulity of Saint Thomas, Museo del Prado, Madrid
- The Supper at Emmaus, Thyssen-Bornemisza Museum, Madrid.
- Saint Sebastian tended by Saint Irene and a Maid, Museo de Bellas Artes de Valencia, Valencia.

== Sweden ==
- A Young Man Reading by Candlelight and Adoration of the Magi, Nationalmuseum, Stockholm

== United Kingdom ==
- Salome receives the Head of John the Baptist, National Gallery, London

== United States ==
- Adoration of the Shepherds, North Carolina Museum of Art, Raleigh, North Carolina
- The Judgement of Solomon, Museum of Fine Arts, Houston, Texas
- The Judgement of Solomon, Currier Museum of Art, Manchester, New Hampshire
