= Adoration of the Shepherds (Stom) =

Painting series by Matthias Stom

Adoration of the Shepherds may refer to several works by the Dutch artist Matthias Stom:

- Adoration of the Shepherds, c. 1640–1645, Museo di Capodimonte, Naples
- Adoration of the Shepherds, now in the Palazzo Madama, Turin
- Adoration of the Shepherds, now in the North Carolina Museum of Art, Raleigh, North Carolina, United States
- Adoration of the Shepherds, now in the Musée d'Arts de Nantes, France
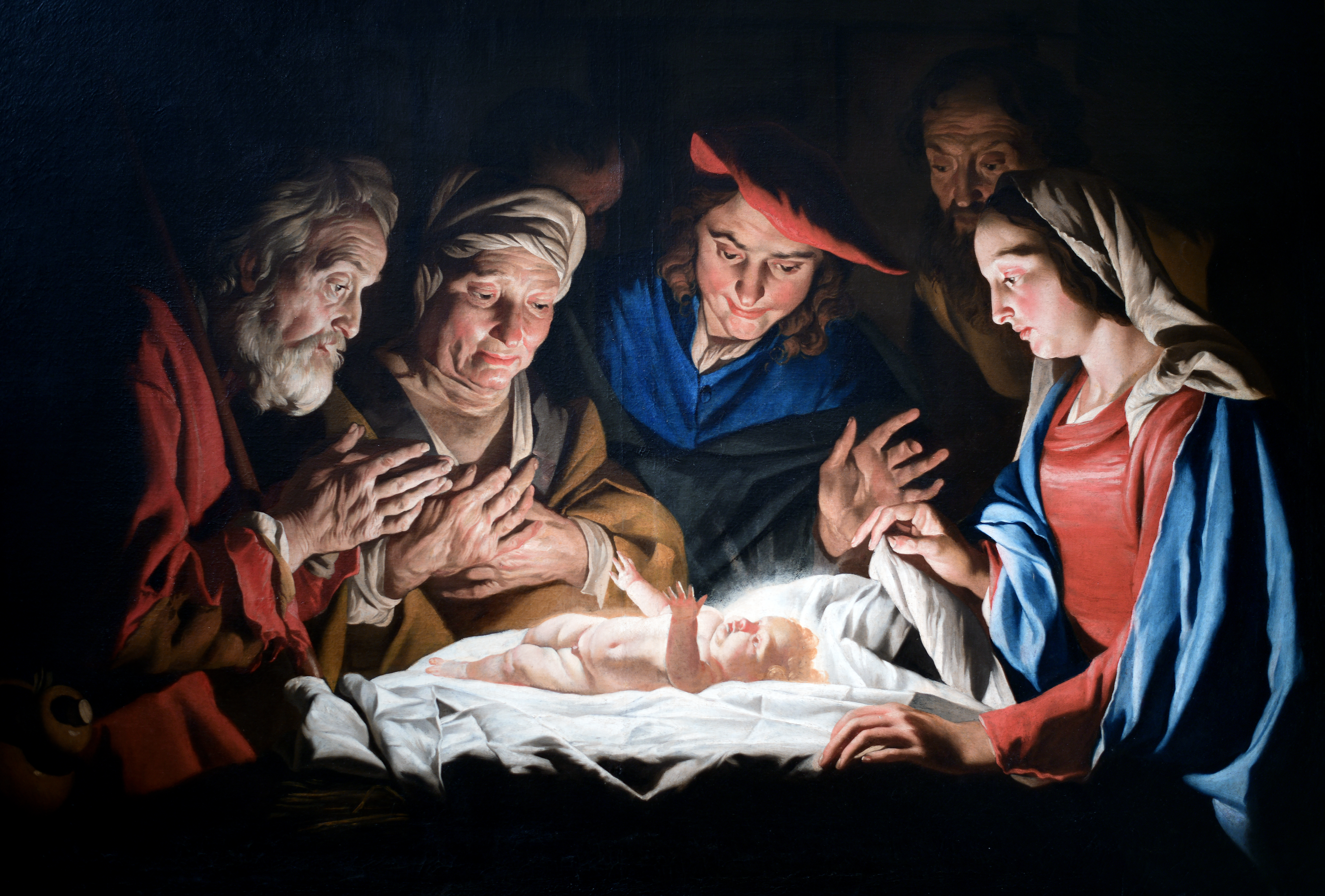
Turin

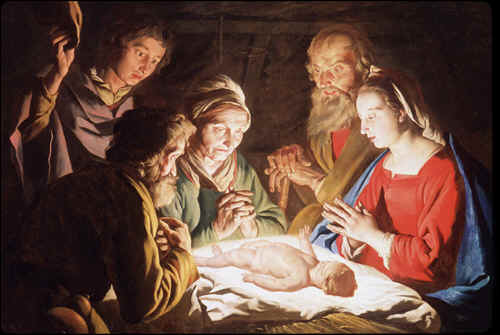
Raleigh

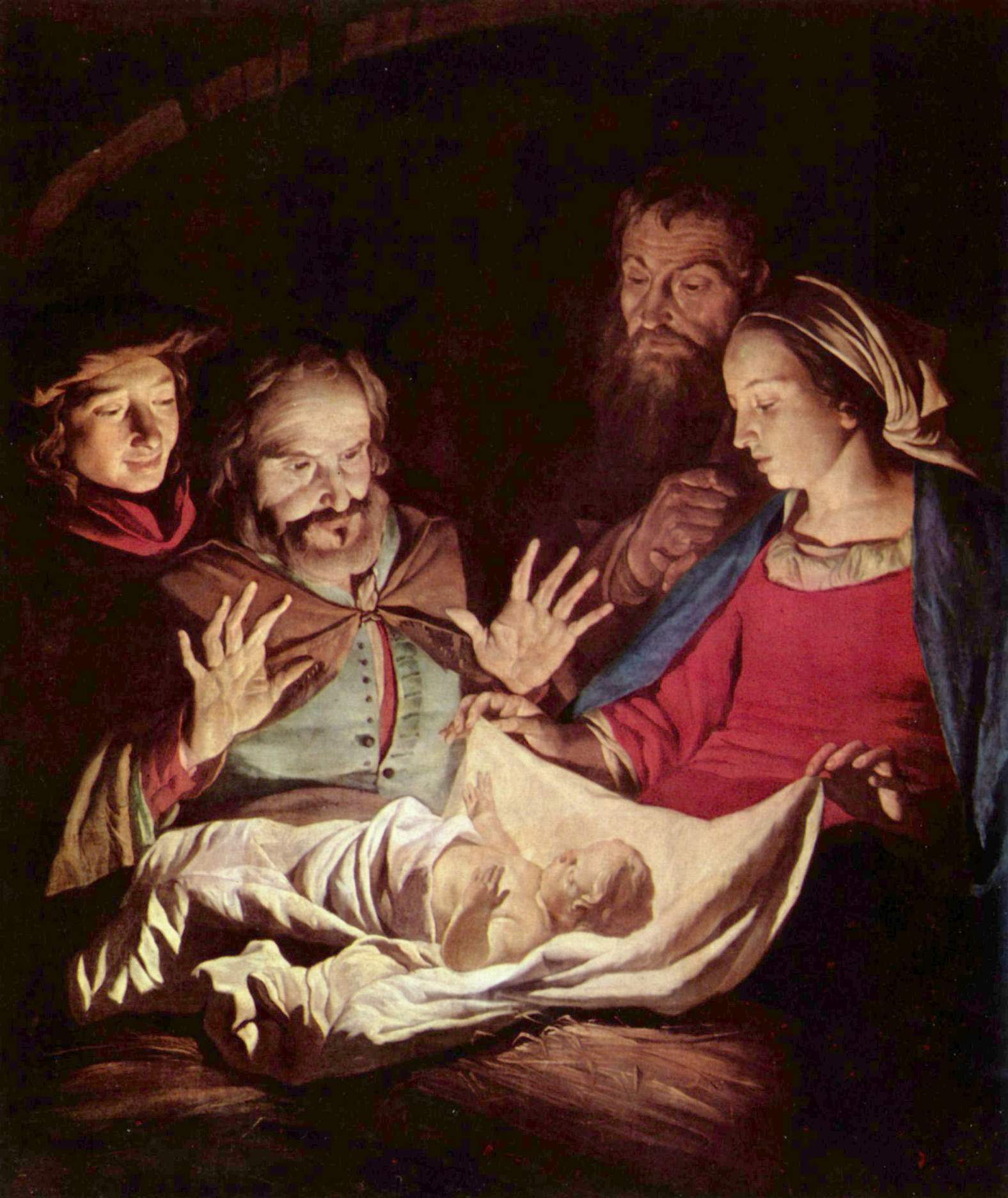
Nantes

== See also ==
- List of paintings by Matthias Stom
