= Adoration of the Magi (Stom) =

Painting series by Matthias Stom

The subject of the Adoration of the Magi was treated at least four times by the Dutch or Flemish painter Matthias Stom:

- Adoration of the Magi, c. 1633–1639, produced during his time in Naples, showing ten figures, now in the Nationalmuseum, Stockholm
- Adoration of the Magi, c. 1633–1639, produced during his time in Naples, showing eight figures, now in the Musée des Augustins, Toulouse
- Adoration of the Magi, c. 1640s, possibly produced on Sicily, horizontal format, bought in 1965 by Brian Sewell and sold at the Bonhams London auction of 5 December 2018 at which Brian Sewell's collection was posthumously sold
- Adoration of the Magi, later than the Sewell version, horizontal format, now in the Musée des Beaux-Arts de Rouen
Versions

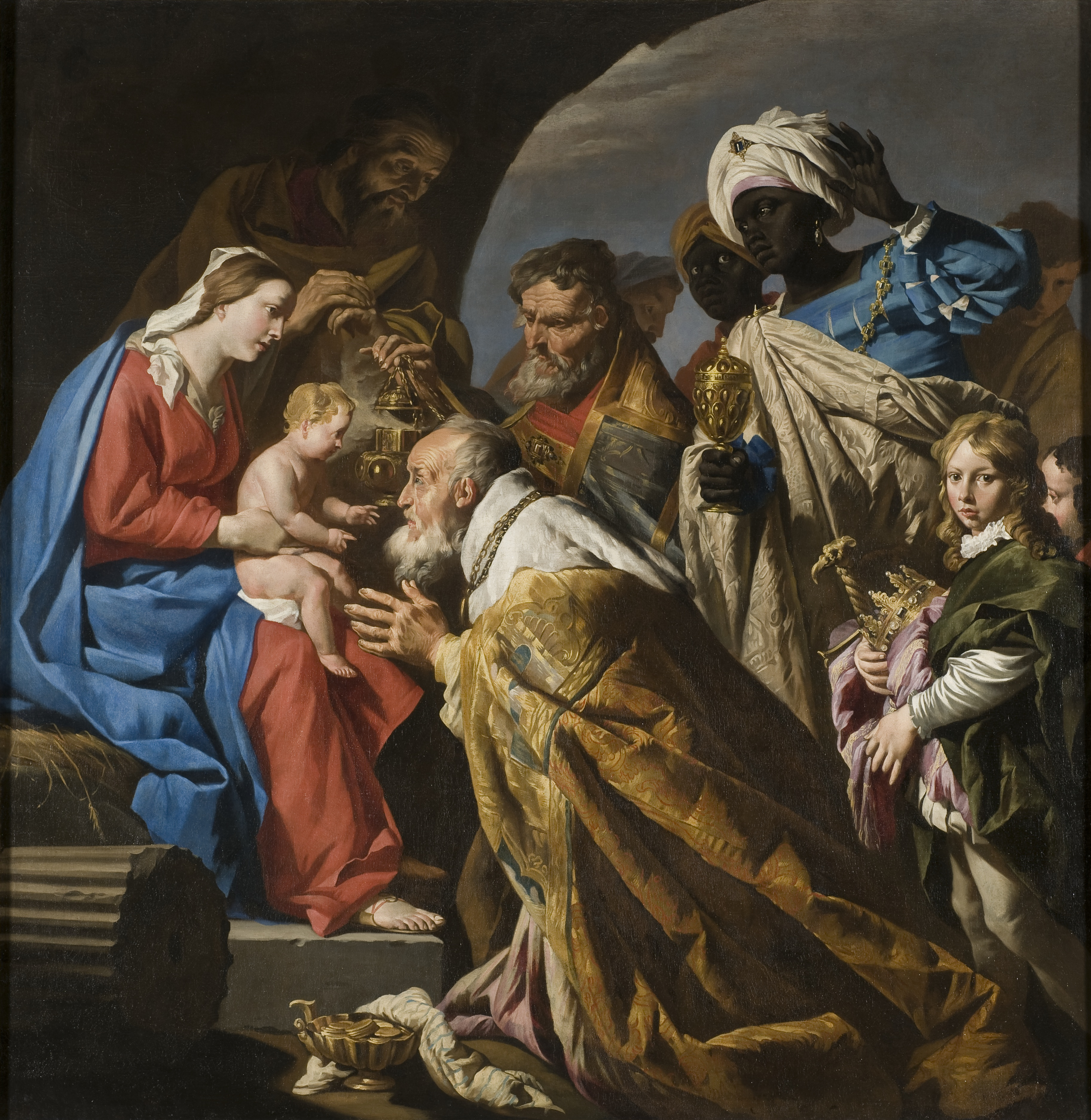
Stockholm

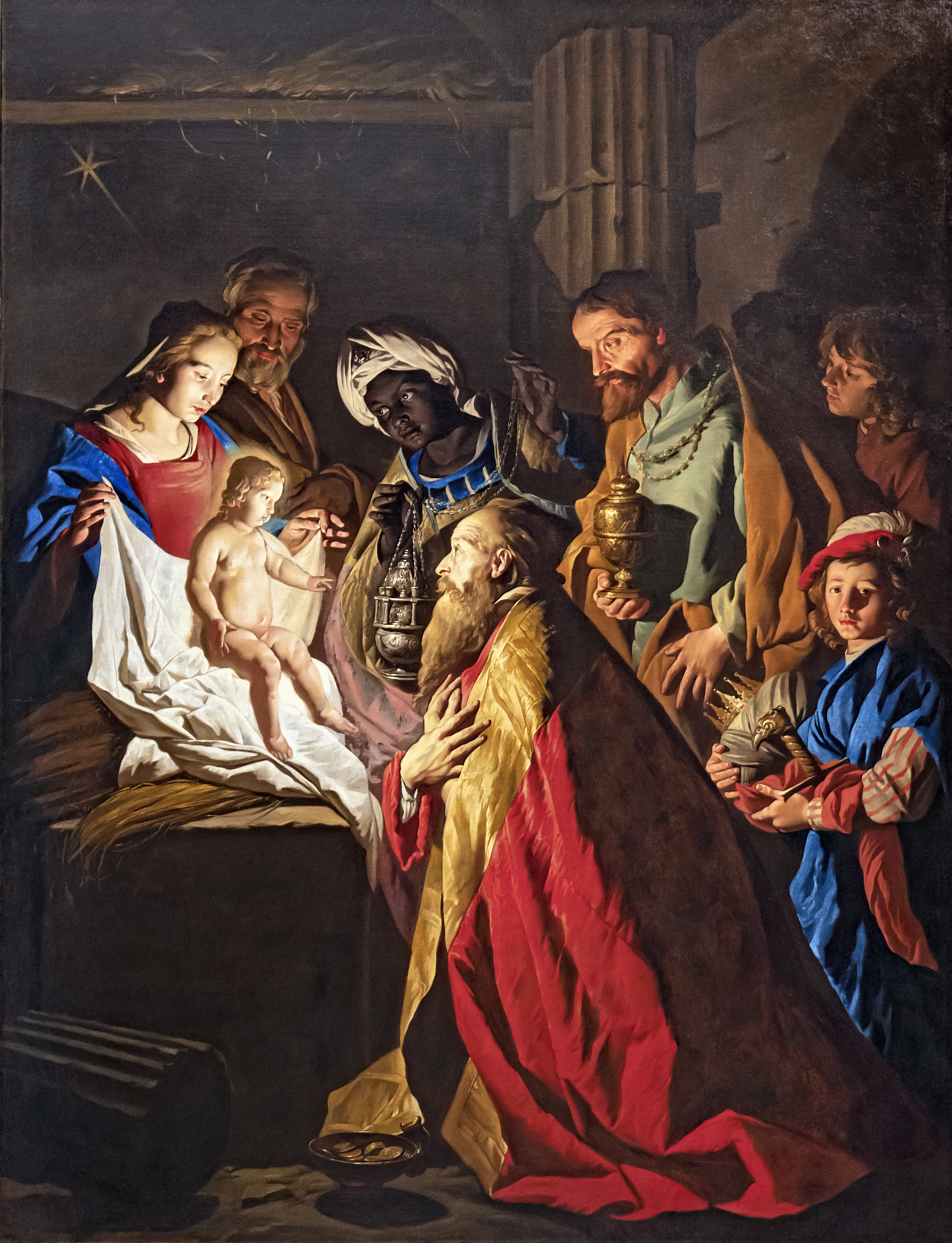
Toulouse

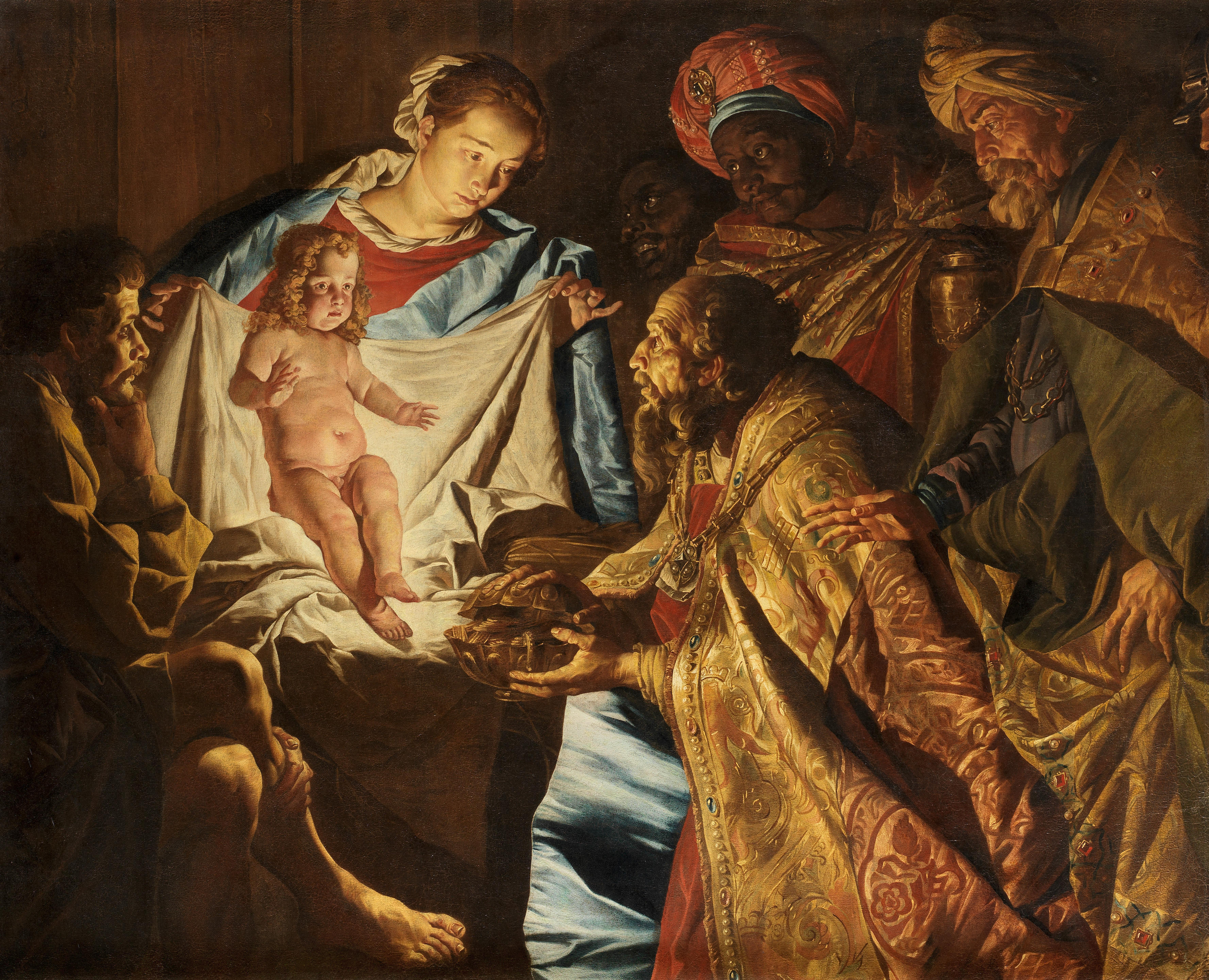
Bonhams auction

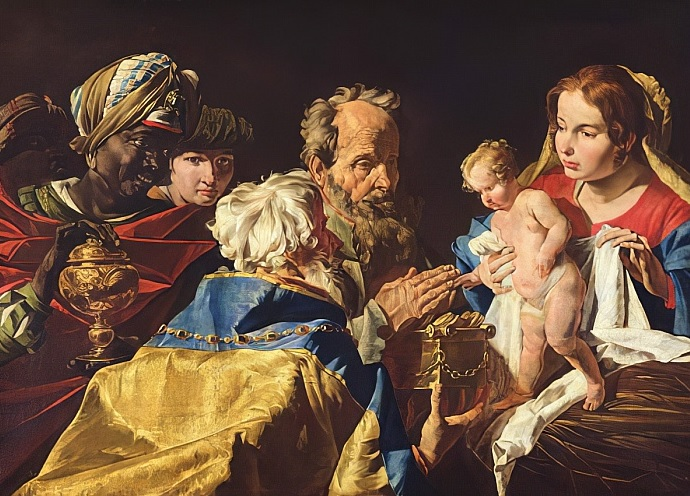
Rouen

== See also ==
- List of paintings by Matthias Stom
