= Salome with the Head of John the Baptist (Stom) =

Painting by Matthias Stom

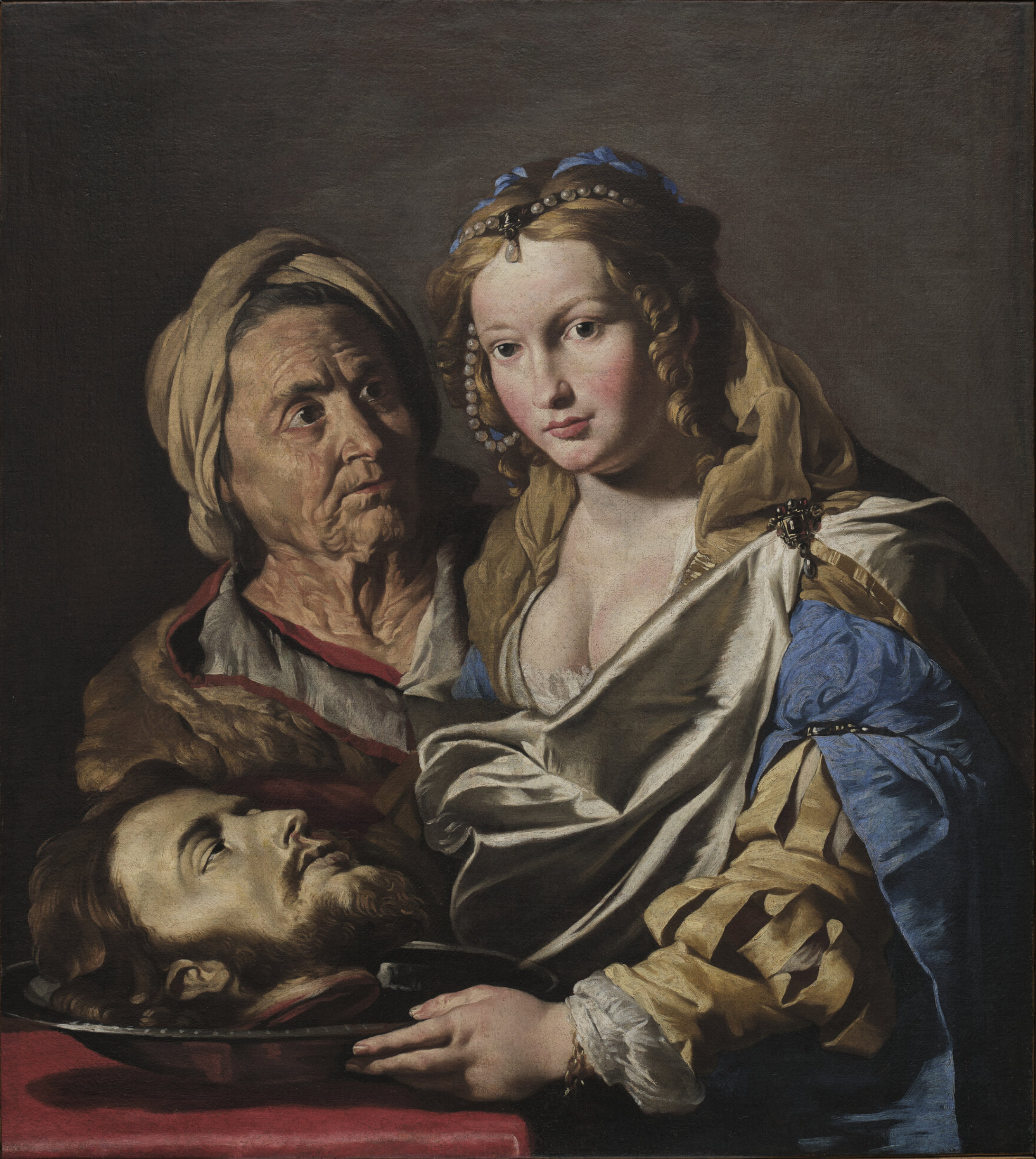
- Artist: Matthias Stom
- Year: uncertain
- Medium: Oil on canvas
- Dimensions: 95 cm × 85 cm (37 in × 33 in)
- Location: Palazzo Bianco, Musei di Strada Nuova, Genoa

Salome with the Head of John the Baptist is an oil on canvas painting by the 17th century painter Matthias Stom. It is now in the Palazzo Bianco of the Musei di Strada Nuova, in Genoa, to whose collections it was left in 1926 by E. L. Peirano. Typically of the painter's style, it combines Flemish attention to detail with the lessons he had learned from Caravaggio's work.

== See also ==
- List of paintings by Matthias Stom
