= Man Blowing on an Ember =

Painting by Matthias Stom

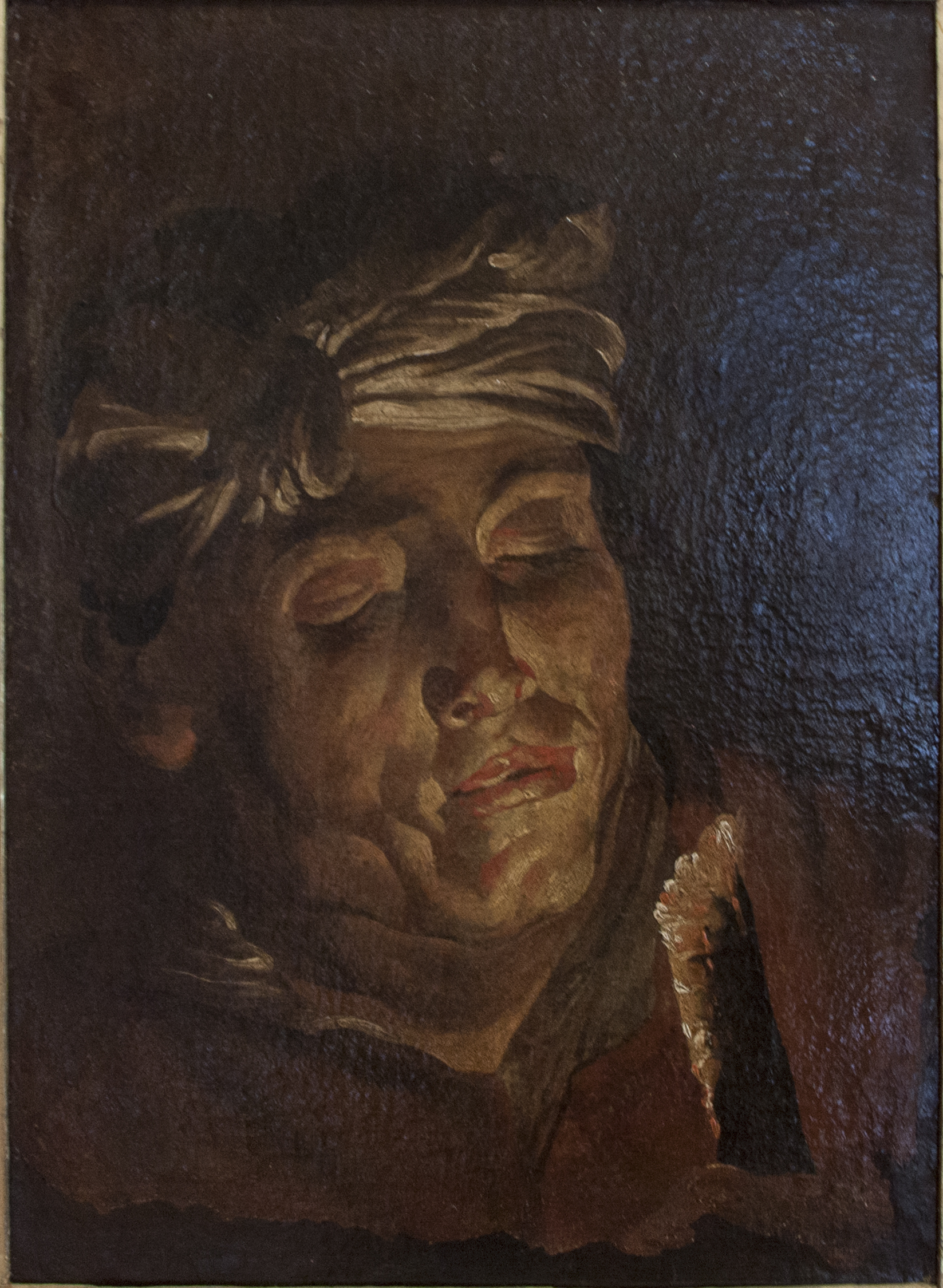
Man Blowing on an Ember by Matthias Stom

Man Blowing on an Ember is an undated work by the Dutch artist Matthias Stom, one of several he produced on Sicily. It represents a man wearing a turban, blowing on a ember. The composition is in the chiaroscuro style and no details about the setting are indicated. The painting was recorded in the Ruffo collection in Messina, and it is now held in the Palazzo Abatellis, in Palermo.

== See also ==
- List of paintings by Matthias Stom
