= Supper at Emmaus (Stom, Grenoble) =

Painting by Matthias Stom

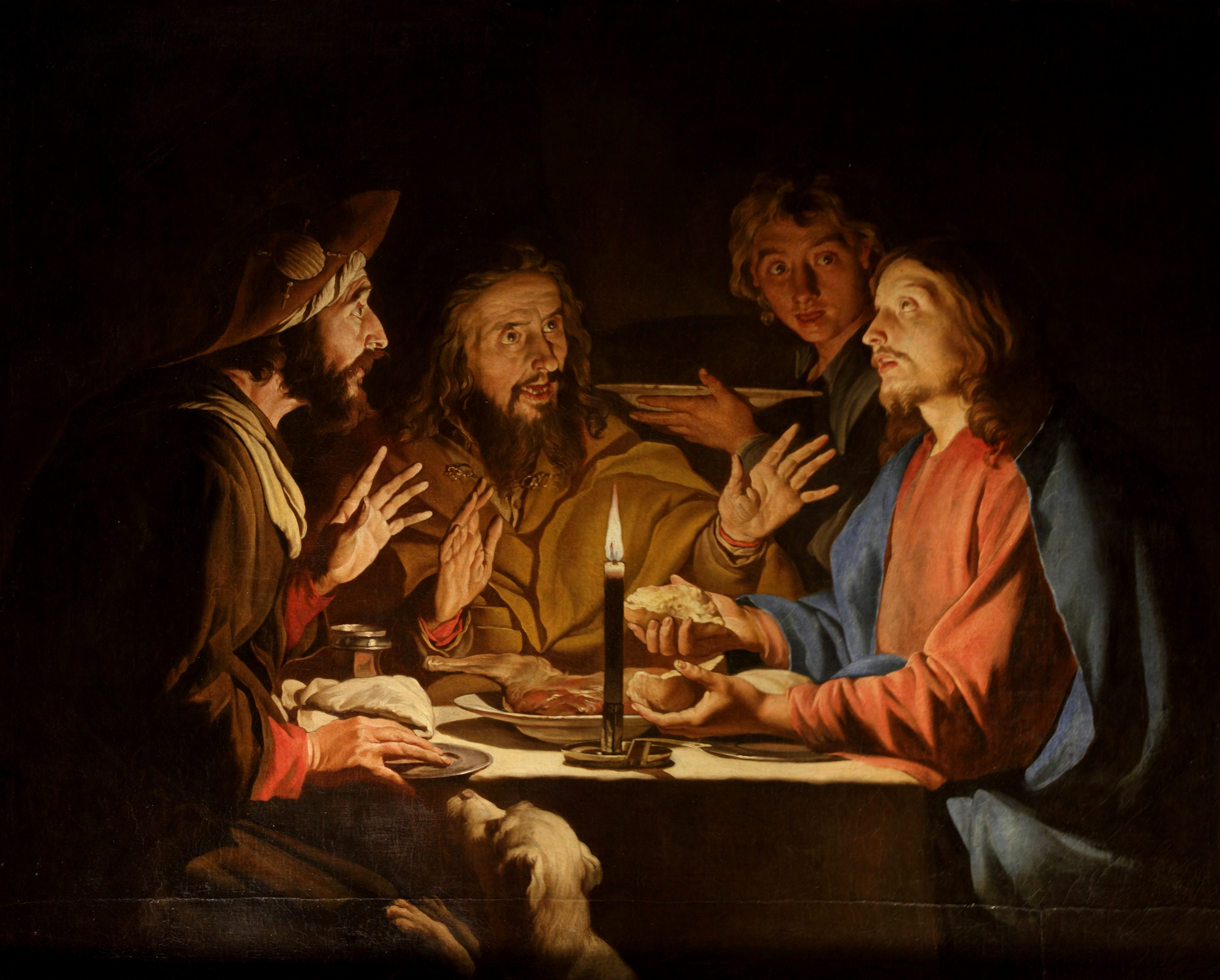
- Artist: Matthias Stom
- Year: c. 1620–1640
- Medium: Oil on canvas
- Dimensions: 156 cm × 187 cm (61 in × 74 in)
- Location: Museum of Grenoble; Grenoble

Supper at Emmaus is an undated oil on canvas painting by the Dutch or Flemish painter Matthias Stom. It was created when the artist was living in Rome, c. 1620–1640. It was bought by the town of Grenoble in 1826 and now hangs in the Museum of Grenoble.

== Description ==
The painting depicts the scene described in the Gospel of Luke, when the Emmaus disciples recognize Jesus when He was breaking the bread. The scene takes place in a very dark room, illuminated only by a candle, at the center of the composition, on the table. The Emmaus disciples are seated, at the left and center, while Jesus is seated at the right. They don`t hide their surprised when they recognize that the man who had been walking with them all the way to Emmaus was Jesus Himself. There is also the detail of the dog, who appears at the left, on the leg of one of the disciples. A servant, who carries a dish, not mentioned in the Gospel of Luke, also witnesses the scene with amazement. A considerable part of the painting lies in darkness, surrounding the scene; it contributes to accentuate the sense of wonder of the apparition as is being witnessed by the three men.

== See also ==
- List of paintings by Matthias Stom
