= Isaac Blessing Jacob (Stom) =

Painting by Matthias Stom

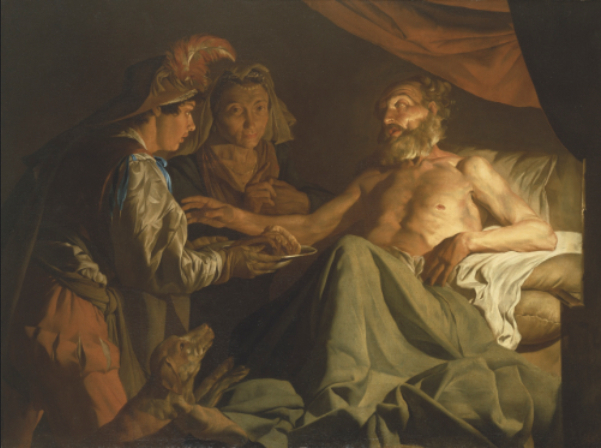
- Artist: Matthias Stom
- Year: c. 1635
- Medium: Oil on canvas
- Dimensions: 136.5 cm × 182 cm (53.7 in × 72 in)
- Location: Barber Institute of Fine Arts; Birmingham

Isaac Blessing Jacob is an oil on canvas painting by Matthias Stom, created c. 1635, whilst the artist was on Sicily.

It is now in the Barber Institute of Fine Arts, in Birmingham, which purchased it in 1994. The sniffing dog indicates the work can also be read as an allegory of the five senses.

The work was exhibited at a 1999-2000 exhibition, the first retrospective on the artist.

== See also ==
- List of paintings by Matthias Stom
