= Saint Jerome (Stom) =

Painting by Matthias Stom

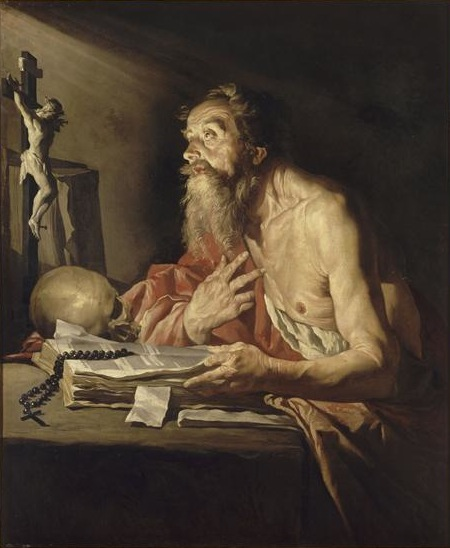
- Artist: Matthias Stom
- Year: c. 1635
- Medium: Oil on canvas
- Dimensions: 117 cm × 97.5 cm (46 in × 38.4 in)
- Location: Musee des Beaux Arts de Nantes; Nantes

Saint Jerome is an oil-on-canvas painting by the Dutch artist Matthias Stom, from c. 1635. It is held in the Musee des Beaux Arts de Nantes, which bought it in 1810.

== Description ==
Rendered in the tenebrist manner, the canvas reveals Saint Jerome seated at a solitary table, enveloped by shadow. Before him lie the emblems of devotion and mortality: a Bible, a rosary, a crucifix, and the stark presence of a skull. His gaze turns toward the shaft of light descending from the upper left, a radiance that pierces the gloom, guiding his meditation and illuminating the fragile boundary between faith and flesh.

The composition is taut, charged with expression. A luminous diagonal carves through the canvas, imposing its rhythm. It draws out the folds of fabric and flesh, most vividly upon the saint’s hands, where the frailty of the body is laid bare. In these gestures, one senses both the eloquence of suffering and the fervent intensity of meditation.

== See also ==
- List of paintings by Matthias Stom
