= King David (Stom) =

Painting by Mathias Stom

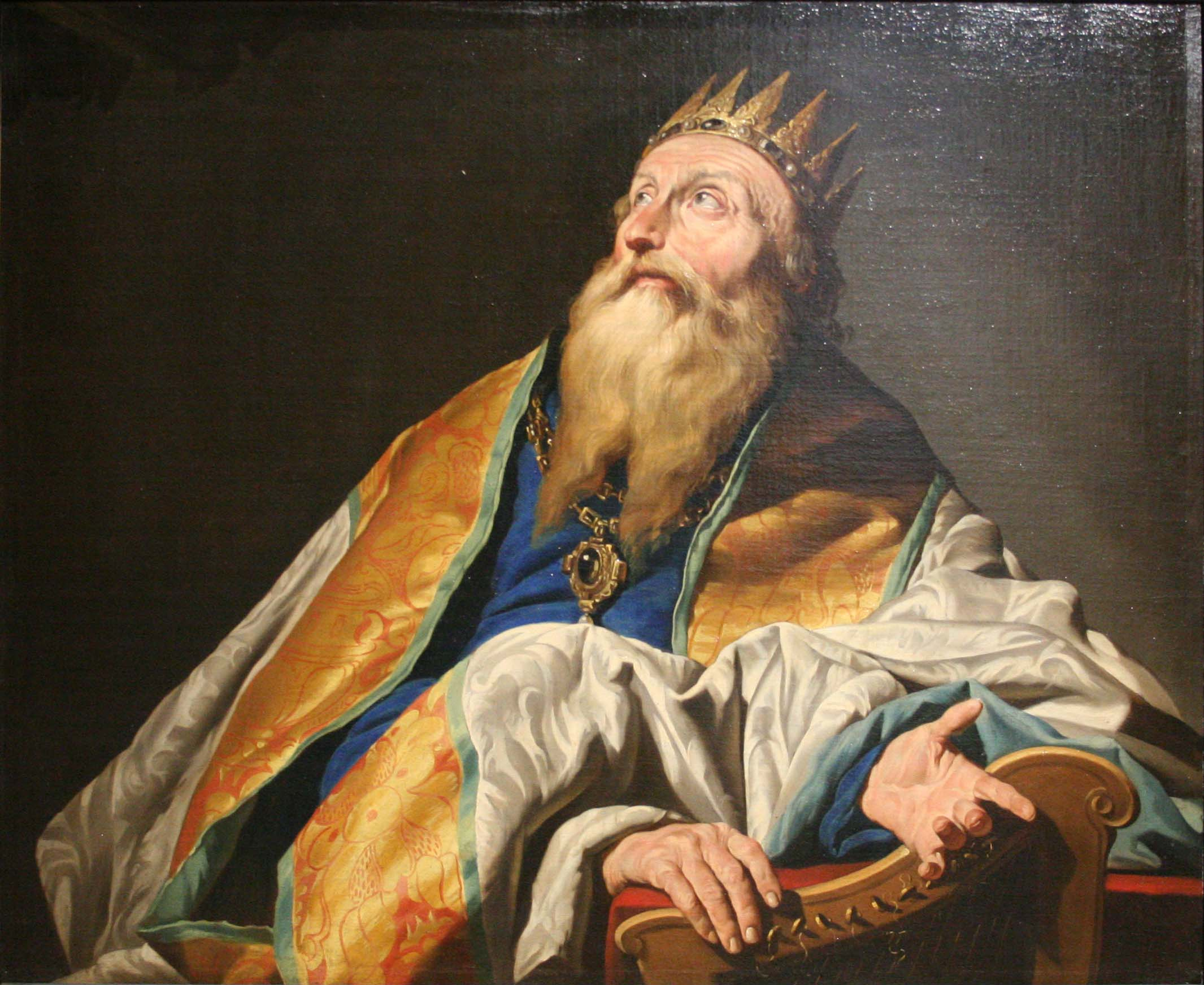
- Artist: Matthias Stom
- Year: c. 1633–1639
- Medium: Oil on canvas
- Dimensions: 96.5 cm × 116 cm (38.0 in × 46 in)
- Location: Musee des Beaux-Arts de Marseille; Marseille

King David is an oil on canvas painting by Matthias Stom, created c. 1633–1639, now held in the Musee des Beaux-Arts de Marseille.

== History and description ==
This canvas is a bust portrait of King David, dressed in heavy adornment. The king of Israel is depicted here as an old bearded man with his eyes raised to the heavens and his hands resting on a harp.

It is thought to have belonged to a set of four paintings of Old Testament kings. This group was itself part of a larger group of twelve works which also included the four Fathers of the Church (St Ambrose, St Gregory, St Jerome and St Augustine of Hippo) and the four Evangelists (St John, St Luke, St Mark and St Matthew), of which St Mark, St John and St Ambrose are now in the Musee des Beaux-Arts de Rennes.

== See also ==
- List of paintings by Matthias Stom
