= Palazzo Alliata di Villafranca =

Building in Palermo, Italy

Coordinates: 38.11460°N 13.36016°E

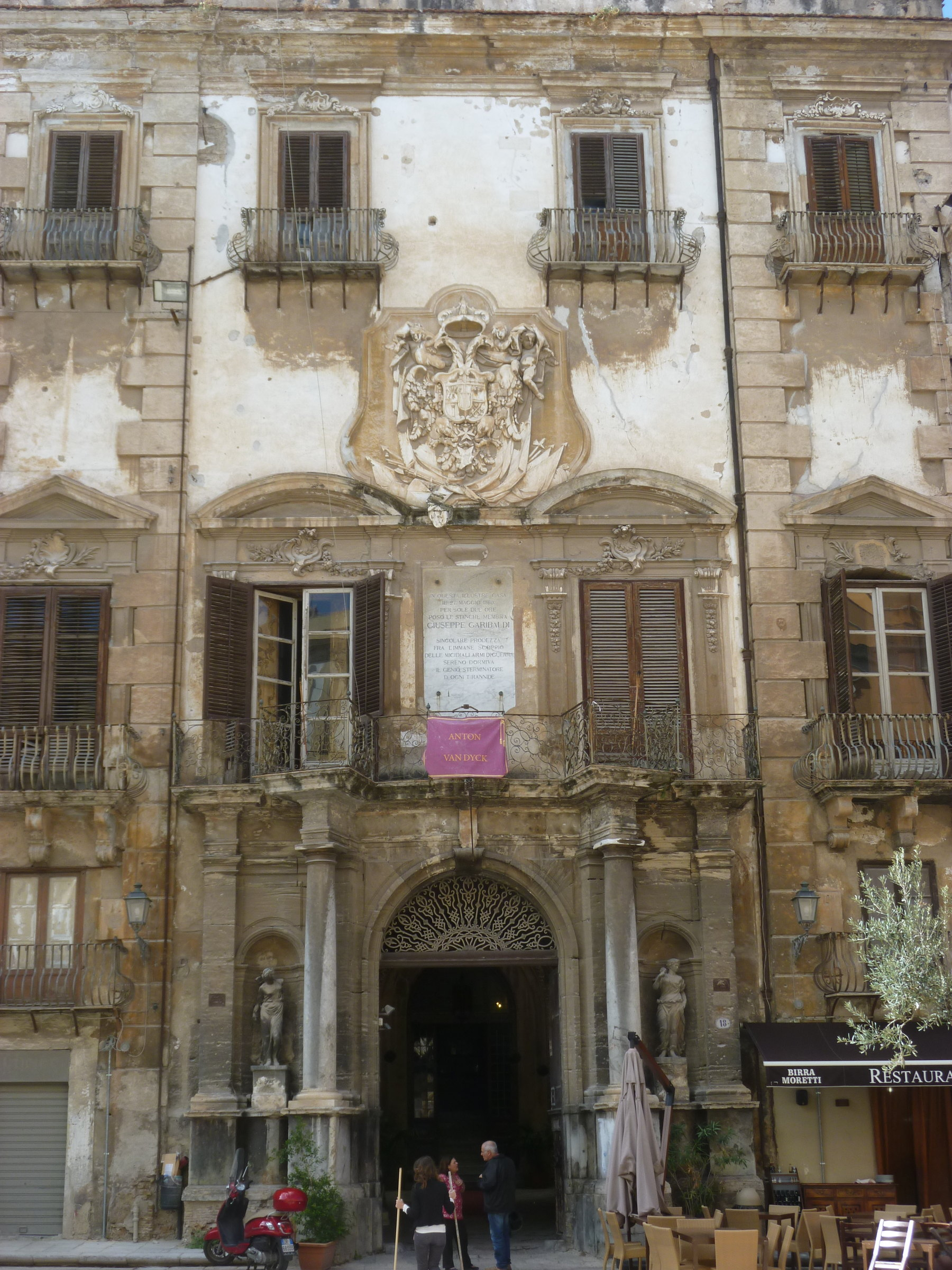

The Palazzo Alliata di Villafranca is former aristocratic palace, now converted into a museum, located just off Via Vittorio Emanuele (ancient Via Cassaro) facing the Piazza Bologni which opens two blocks west of the Quattro Canti intersection, in the ancient quarter of the Albergaria of the city of Palermo, region of Sicily, Italy.

== History ==
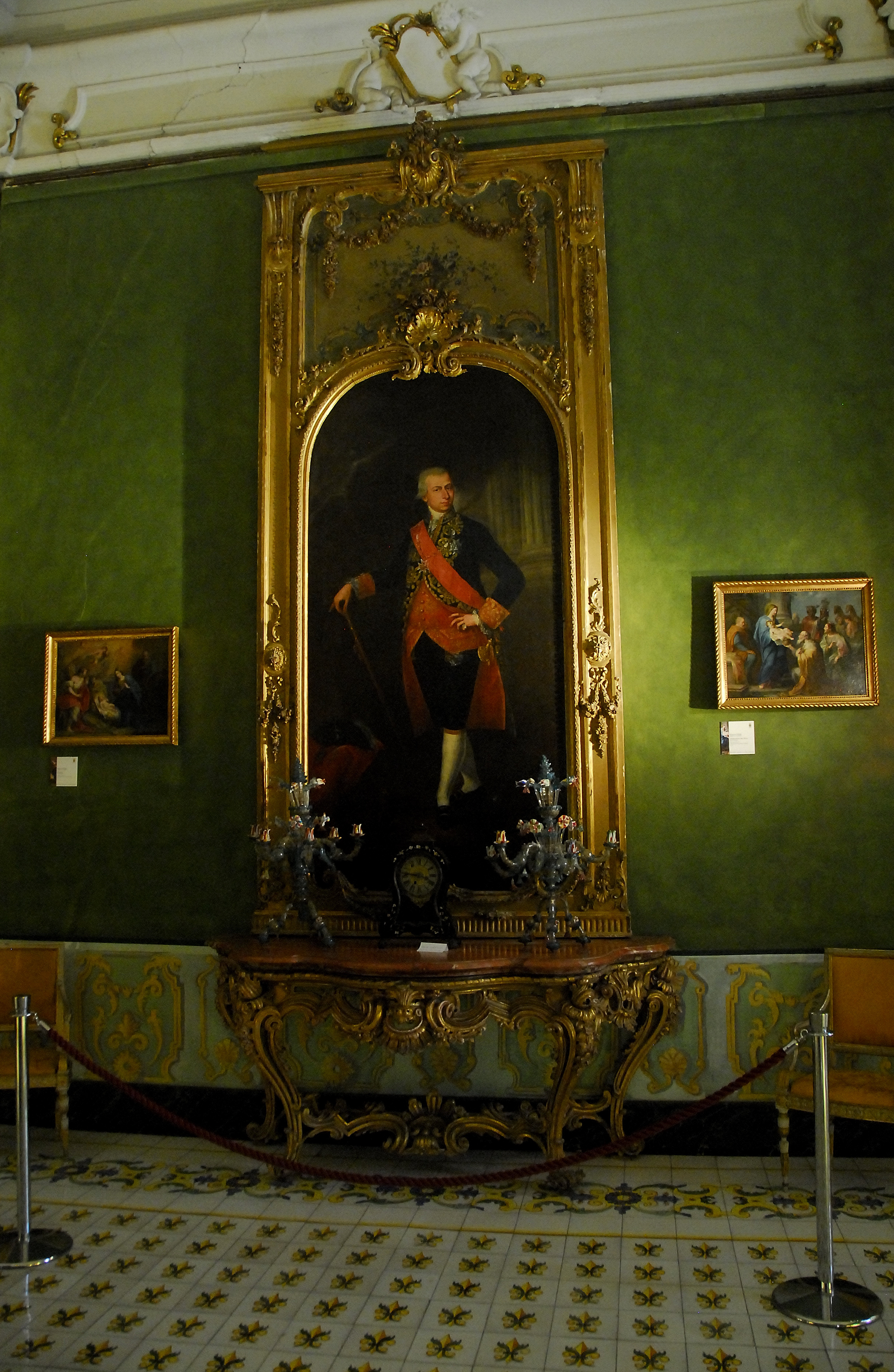
Salone del Principe Fabrizio Alliata Colonna, with a painting of one of the princes of the family

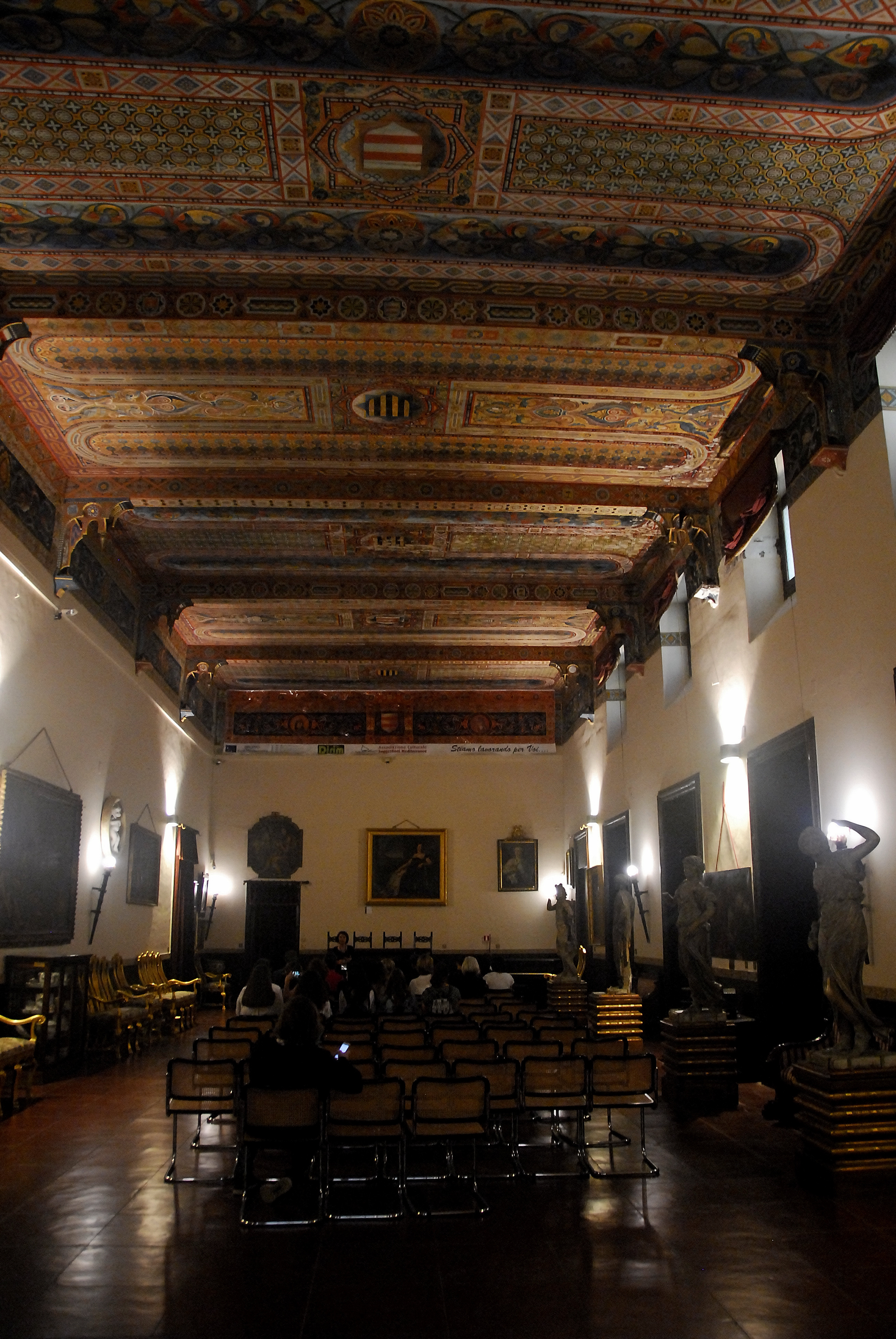
Sala dei Musici

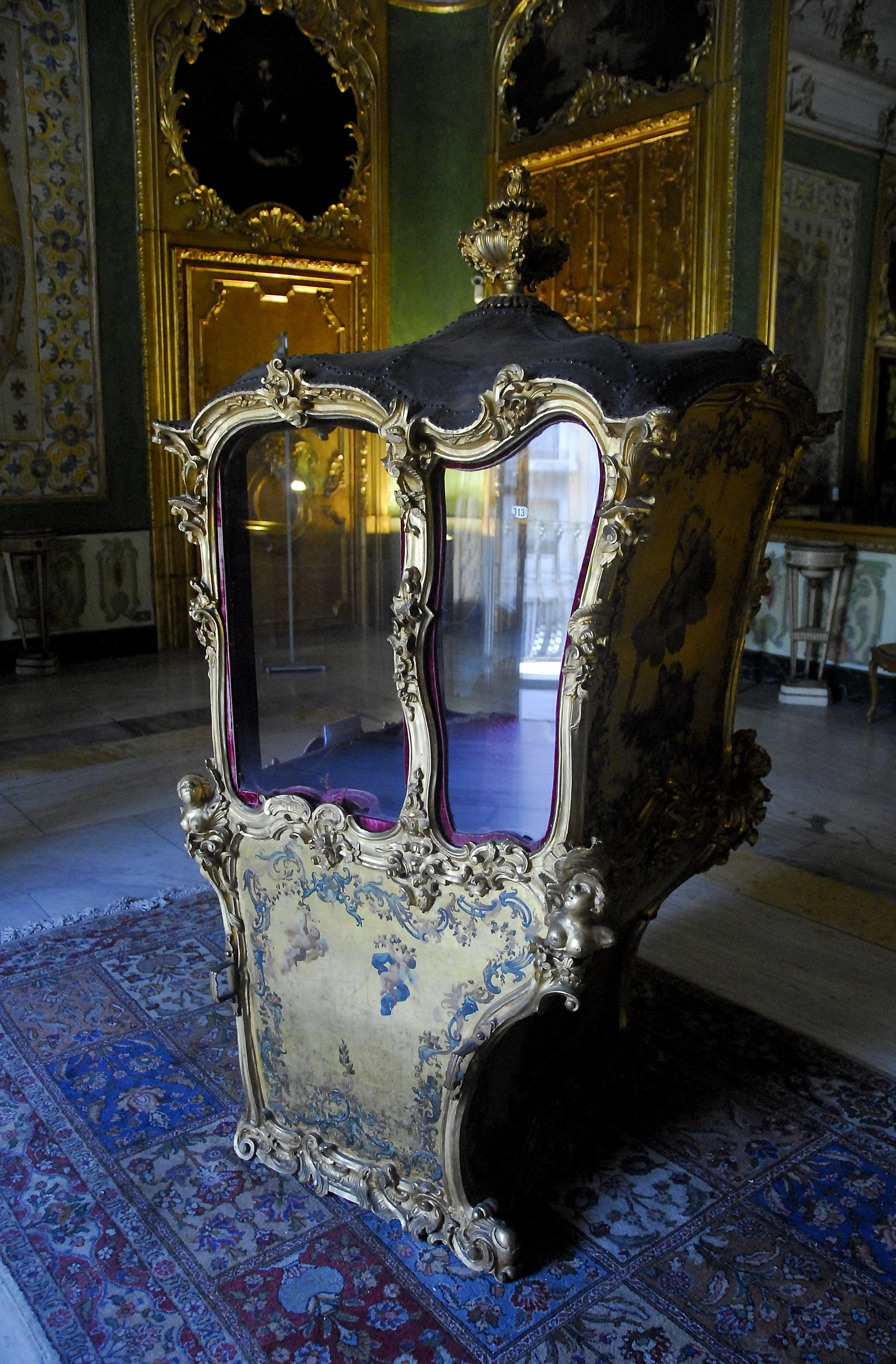
Portantina

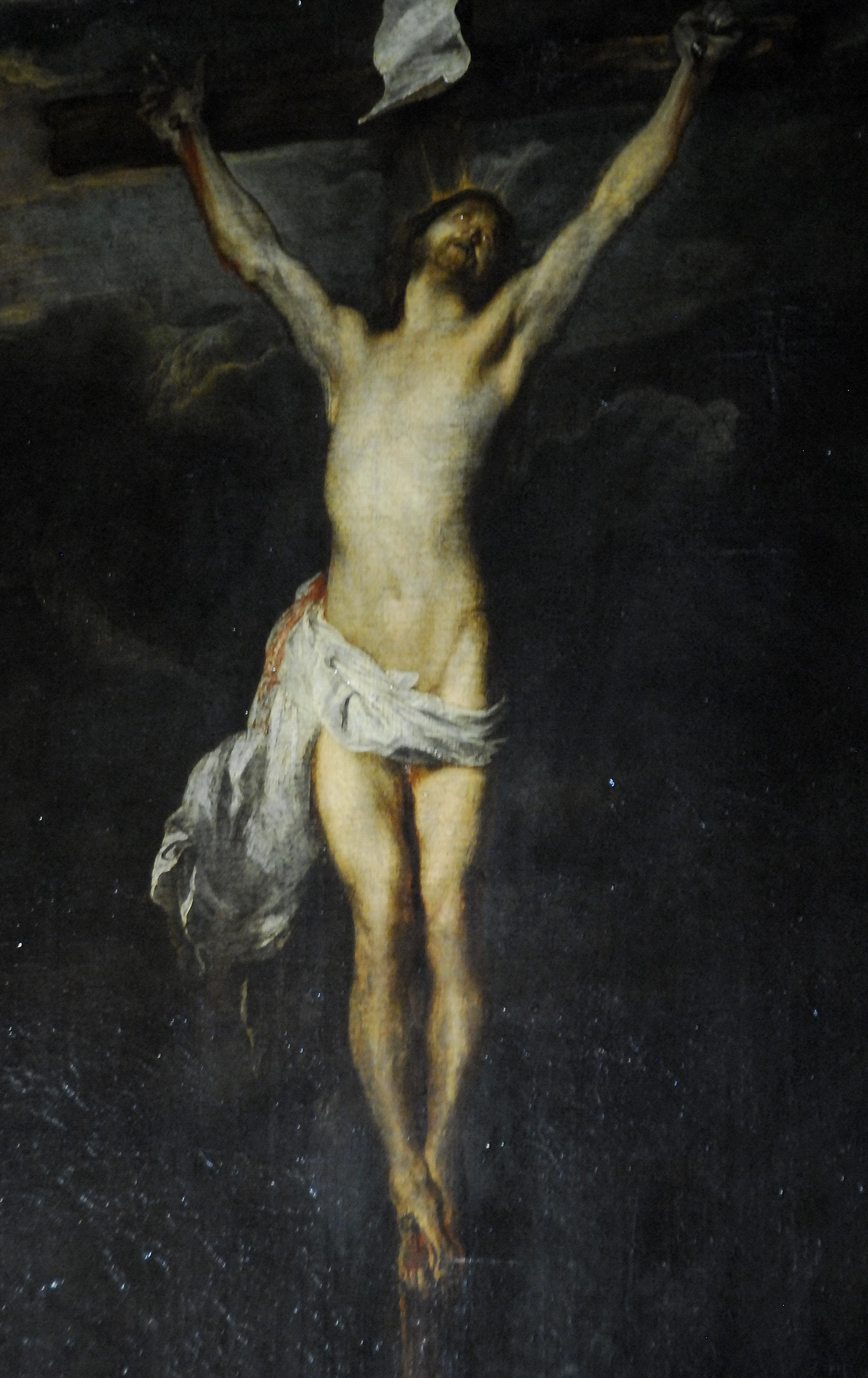
Crucifixion by Anthony van Dyck

By 1567, this area was part of a large garden or orchard, known as Piano d'Aragona with a large house owned by Aloisio da Bologna, baron of Montefranco. Vannino Beccadelli had arrived from in Palermo at the beginning of the XIV century. The family was later called "di Bologna", and gave the name to the piazza in front of the palace. One prominent member of this family was Il Panormita, a poet of the Aragonese court on the island. Another member was the archbishop Simone di Bologna, who is linked to the enlargement of the Cathedral of Palermo, and erection of the Archbishop's Palace. However, the son of Aloisi did not have male heirs, and by 1640, the palace was sold to the Alliata di Villafranca family, wealthy bankers from Pisa that had arrived to Palermo around the 14th century, and by 1609 had acquired the title of prince of Paruta.

The palace suffered damage during the 1751 earthquake, prompting a major reconstruction that joined the palace to adjacent houses. The work was commissioned from the architect Giovanni Battista Vaccarini, assisted by the Cascione and Ferrigno. The interior decoration included frescoes by Gaspare Serenario, Vaccarini's brother-in-law, who depicted large frescoes to the Glory of Prince Alliata and the Princess admires the Temple of Glory. The frescoes were lost after the bombardments of World War II. The fresco depicting San Dazio before the Virgin remains. During the revolution of 1820, the Palace was heavily damaged by the insurgents. The palace was owned and the main residence of the Alliata di Villafranca until the late 20th century. In the following century the palace was rebuilt to its current late 17th century appearance to designs by the architect Giovanni Battista Vaccarini.

The monumental facade, now somewhat dilapidated, has two symmetrical doors recalls the era during which the building was used by the Kingdom of Sicily's postal service, as do a number of rooms on the ground floor. The two large stucco coats of arms by Giacomo Serpotta show the heraldic arms of the Alliata as Princes of Villafranca. A plaque on the centre of the main facade recalls Giuseppe Garibaldi's stop in the building in 1860:

In questa illustre casa

il 27 maggio 1860
per sole due ore
posò le stanche membra
GIUSEPPE GARIBALDI
---
Singolare prodezza
fra l'immane scoppio
delle micidiali armi di guerra
sereno dormiva
il genio sterminatore

di ogni tirannide

The interior salons of the palace do not reflect the dilapidated exterior; the palace houses one of the city's main art collections, including The Stoning of St Stephen and The Tribute Money (both painted in 1639 by Matthias Stom), a Crucifixion by Anthony van Dyck, the 1791 Birth of Prince Giuseppe Alliata Moncada, son of Prince Fabrizio Alliata Colonna and Giuseppina Moncada Branciforte, with Abundance and Fame and with the Genius of Palermo Paying Homage by Desiderio De Angelis, Saint Joseph with the Christ Child (attributed to Pietro Novelli) and works by Francesco Lojacono, Mario Rutelli and Filippo de Pisis. The documents commissioning the Van Dyck are still in the family archive. As well as paintings on canvas and card, the building's art collections include drawings, prints and stucco medallions. The building's furnishings include mirrors, Murano glass chandeliers, elaborate over-doors, maiolica flooring (including the family coat of arms), furniture, vases, works in silver, bronze, porcelain and ceramic, classical archaeological finds, wax sculptures, geological samples, marble helmets and shields, lace and embroidery.

=== Recent history ===
In 1984 the building's owner princess Rosalia Correale Santacroce transferred ownership to the archdiocese of Palermo for its seminary. It was occasionally open to the public for short periods until 2006 during the restoration of the Sala Verde and Sala dello Stemma (2006). It next hosted exhibitions and conferences including the restoration and display of the Stom works (October 2010-May 2011) and an exhibition centred on the newly restored Van Dyck (December 2012-January 2013). The Musicians (attributed to Gaspare Traversi) and Annunciation (Pietro Novelli) have also been recently restored. The palace was reopened to the public from 2013 onwards by the archepiscopal seminary.

== Interior ==
=== Ground floor ===
- Kitchens
- Scuderie.
- Rooms of the royal postal service, the 'Corrieri maggiori ereditari del Regno di Sicilia'.

=== Main floor ===
- Scalone d'onore or main staircase.
- Vestibolo or vestibule, with a 1929 mosaic window by Pietro Bevilacqua showing Saint Dacius Alliata and San Leo Alliata (respectively Archbishop of Milan from 530 and a martyr in 1274), both from the Alliata family.
- Salotto Verde or Salottino Barocco, recorded as housing the Van Dyck in 1625 and thus probably the building's original private chapel, with the only surviving fresco by Gaspare Serenari, showing St Dacius Presented to the Virgin Mary, surrounded by Serpotti-style stuccowork.
- Salottino Giallo or Sala del Té.
- Salone Rosa or Sala del baccarà.
- Salone del Principe Fabrizio Alliata Colonna., with a Serpotti-style stucco ceiling of allegorical subjects and previously housing Serenari's 1756 fresco Princess Admiring the Temple of Glory, the room now houses the two works by Stom, previously in the original Quadreria or Sala dei Musici.
- Fumoir or Stanza di Cuoio.
- Sala dello Stemma., previously housing Serenari's 1756 fresco Fame Showing the Princes' Glory, with the four seasons in stucco (workshop of Serpotta) at the corners of the room. The paintings were damaged by earthquakes and finally destroyed in bombing during the Second World War. It now houses two 1613-1618 works attributed to Pietro D'Asaro, Orpheus Singing to the Animals and Shipwreck or the Miraculous Haul of Fish
- Sala dei Musici., previously a 'quadreria' or art gallery

== Gallery ==
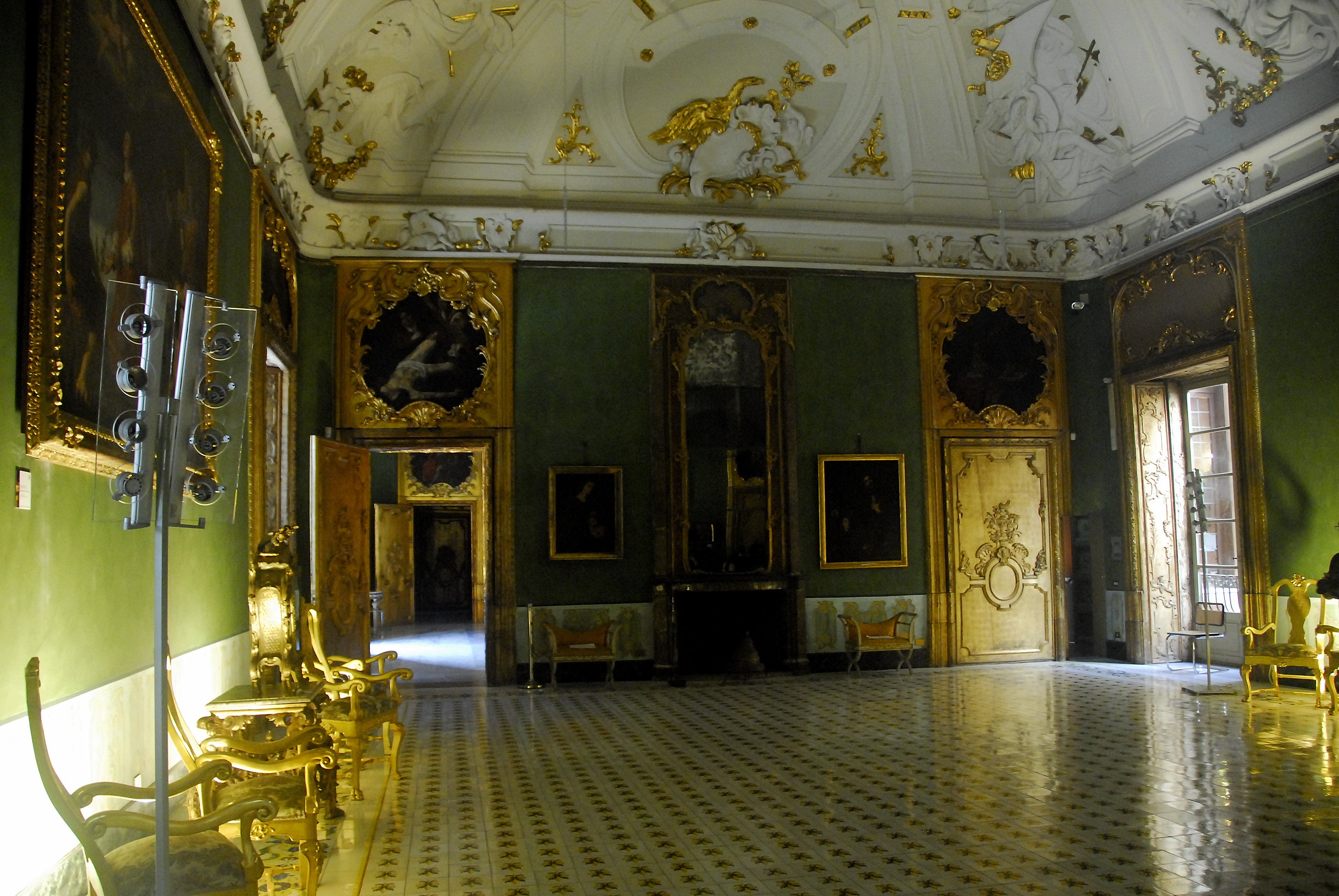
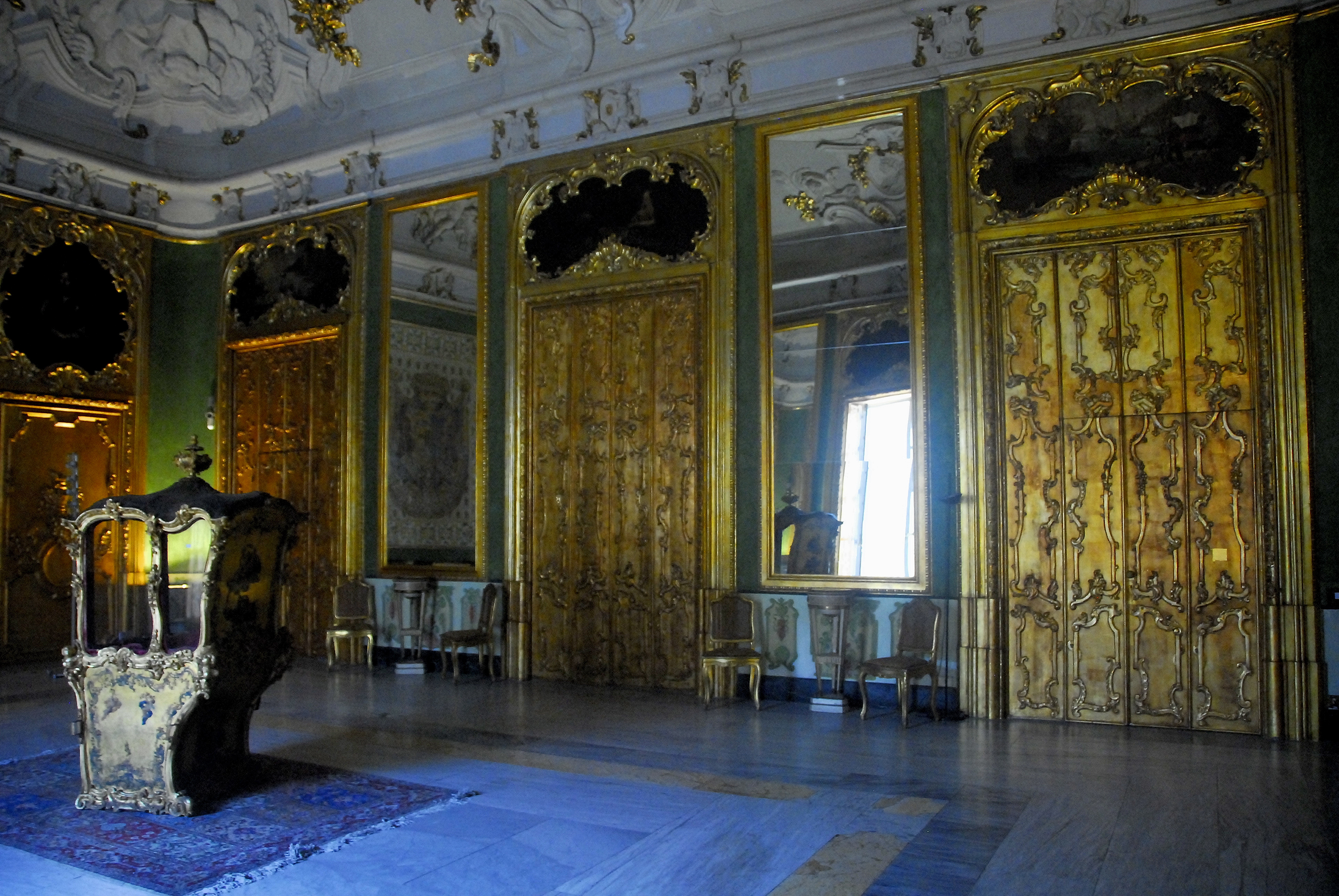
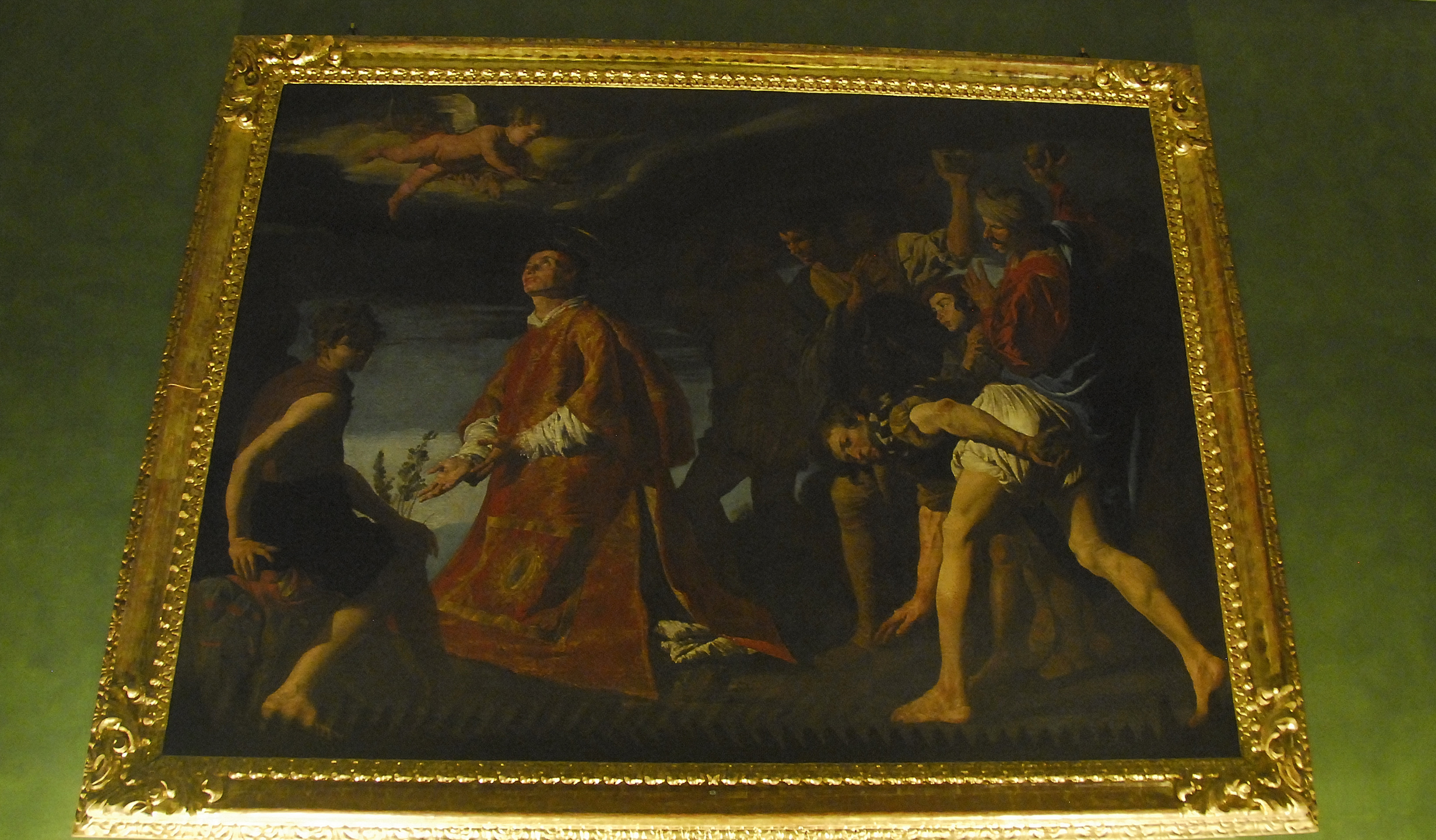
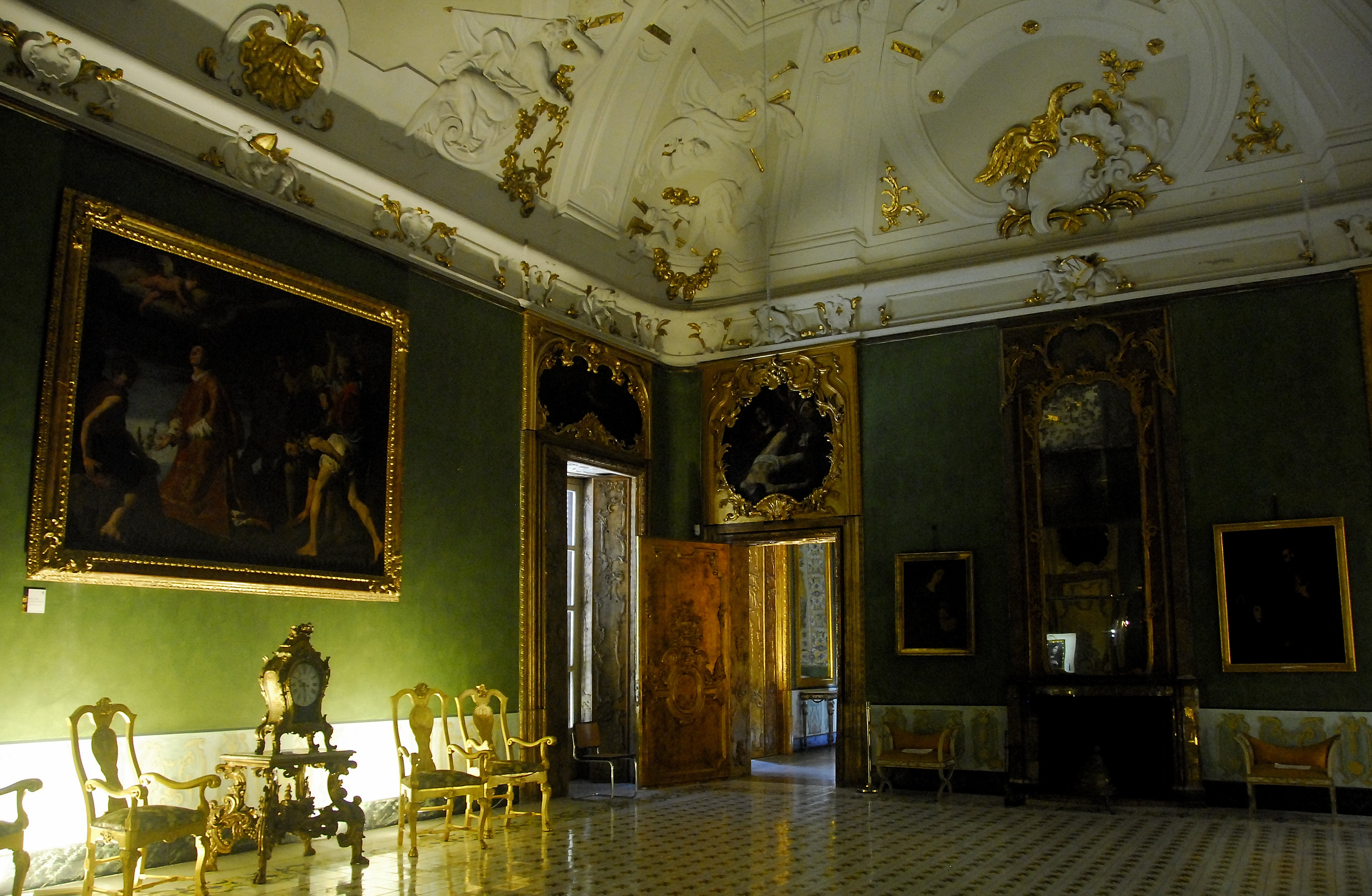
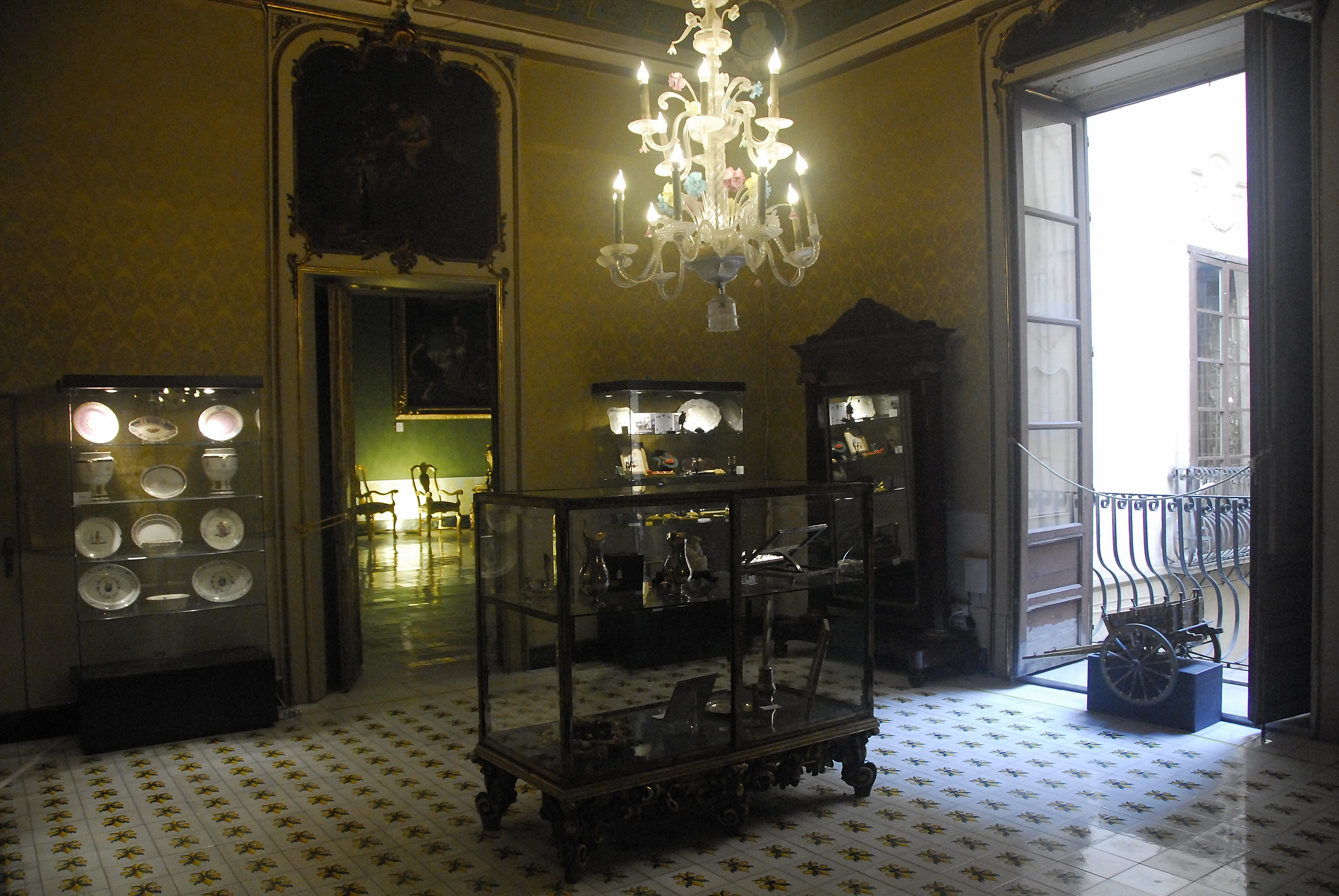
