= The Judgement of Solomon (Stom, Houston) =

Painting by Matthias Stom

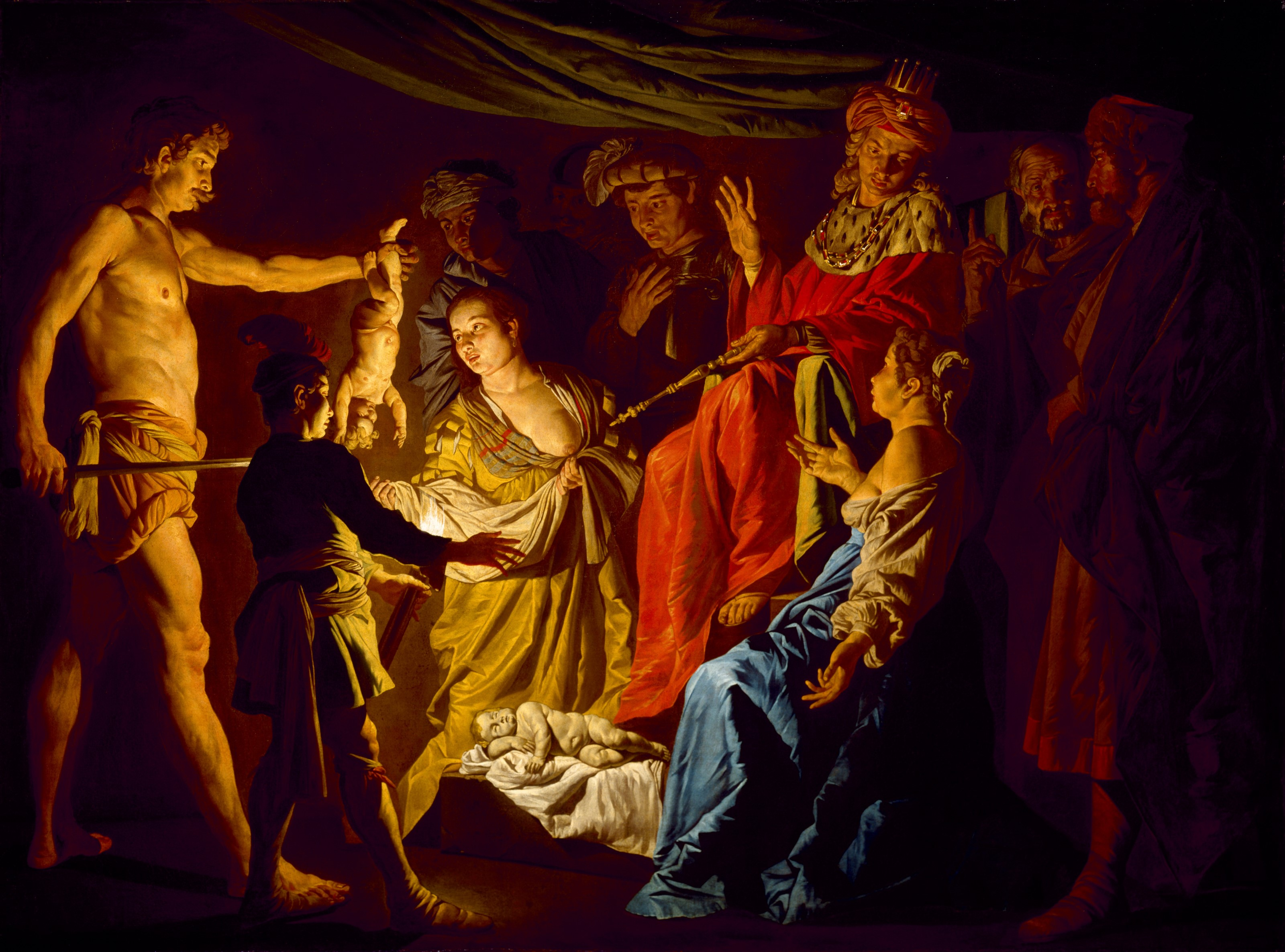
- Artist: Matthias Stom
- Year: c. 1640
- Medium: Oil on canvas
- Dimensions: 152.5 cm × 204.9 cm (60.0 in × 80.7 in)
- Location: Museum of Fine Arts; Houston

The Judgement of Solomon is an oil on canvas painting by Matthias Stom, created c. 1640, representing the Judgement of Solomon. It is held in the Museum of Fine Arts, in Houston.

== Description ==
The painting depicts the famous Biblical scene of the judgement of Solomon, when the Hebrew king had to face two women who disputed the same child. One of the women had lost her child and claimed the other mother's offspring as her own. The episode is one of the most well known that illustrates the famed "wisdom of Solomon". The scene takes place in a very dark interior, where the figures are dimly illuminated, in a typical chiaroscuro. Solomon, seated on his throne, is dressed in red and wears his small crown upon a turban. The dead child lies at his feet. A executioner with a moustache, wearing only a loincloth, helds the living child by one of his feet, and has a sword in the other hand. He seems to be about to split the surviving child in half, so that no women can claim to be his mother anymore, like Solomon had decided. The king stares calmly and seems to be about to rule that the true mother of the child is the one who doesn't want to see him dead. Other people, probably from the king's entourage, watch or discuss the scene, some of them with a troubled look.

== Provenance ==
The canvas was previously owned by Principe Carcafa d'Andria of Naples. It is now held in the Museum of Fine Arts, in Houston, whose purchase of it in 1970 was funded by the Laurence H. Favrot Bequest.

== See also ==
- List of paintings by Matthias Stom
