= Bill Carroll (musician) =

American singer-songwriter

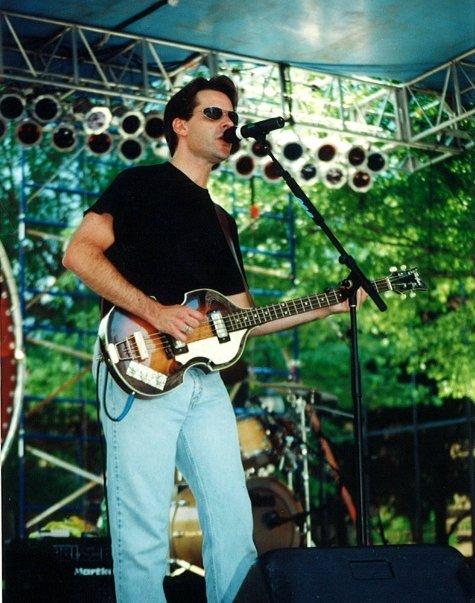
- Carroll performing live in Charlotte, North Carolina

Background information
- Born: December 29, 1966 (age 59); Wilmington, Delaware United States
- Genres: Rock and roll, Power pop
- Occupations: Musician, songwriter, record producer
- Instruments: Vocals, bass guitar, guitar
- Years active: 1980s –
- Labels: Aardvark Records, Oh Very Records, Indievision Records, Alpha Records
- Website: billcarroll1.bandcamp.com/releases/

Bill Carroll is an American singer, songwriter, record producer, bassist and guitarist. He has been a professional musician since the mid-1980s, and has been a member of the groups No Such Thing, Doubting Thomas, and The Real Underground. As solo artist, he scored a Rate-A-Record appearance on Dick Clark's American Bandstand program on April 2, 1988, with "When We're Apart", shortly after being signed to Hollywood-based Aardvark Records.

Carroll's musical styles have ranged from orchestral arrangements (Dune I from 1994's Kohoutek) to television, sitcom, and film scores, with themes like The Mecklenburgers, to what he is best known for: rock and roll power pop. He is heavily influenced by The Beatles, The Who, The Jam, REM, Jellyfish, and less mainstream artists such as Bruce Foxton, Lee Mavers, Kevin Gilbert and John Wetton.

Carroll joined Doubting Thomas as vocalist/bassist in 1997, contributing songs to the band's last two albums, Who Died and Made You King (1998) and their eponymous live recording, Doubting Thomas (1999). He remained with the group until it disbanded in 2001, but as of 2009, Doubting Thomas had reformed for limited performances, and released a new album in 2025 produced by the band, Daniel Hodges, and Don Dixon.

In 2004, Carroll composed and performed the theme for the PBS program The Mecklenburgers. He was nominated for a regional Emmy Award for the song in late 2005. In 2019, he received a Gold Telly Award as part of the international Telly Awards for music he composed for a recycling awareness campaign in Mecklenburg County, NC. He was nominated for another Emmy Award in late 2019.

In July 2026, Carroll announced that he was working on an album of new material with co-producer Greg Endy and a studio band, Black Squirrel Orchestra. The first single from the collaboration, "Scheherazade," is set for release on Sept. 25, 2026.

== Albums ==
- Summer of Light/Get Away, 1986, Alpha Records
- When We're Apart/So Lonely, 1987, Aardvark Records
- Lonely Stories From The One-Horse Town, (with No Such Thing) 1991, Aardvark Records
- Kohoutek, 1994
- Cut It Out (with Doubting Thomas), 1998, Oh Very Records
- Who Died and Made You King? (with Doubting Thomas), 1998, Oh Very Records
- Live (with Doubting Thomas), 1999, Indievision Records
- City of Peace Soundtrack (with Gina Stewart and Brenda Gambill), 2001
- The Mecklenburgers Soundtrack, 2005
- F.T.W. A Tribute To Gideon Smith (contributed one song, "Outerspace Girl") 2010, Scorpius Triangle Records
- Forever Changed (with Doubting Thomas), 2025
- Ghost in the Wire (with Black Squirrel Orchestra), 2027

== Production credits ==
- Lonely Stories From The One-Horse Town (with No Such Thing and Kevin H. Short), 1991
- Kohoutek, 1994
- Concrete Mary, (Concrete Mary, w/ Joe Dorn and Rick Dior) 1999
- Right in the Nuts: A Tribute to Aerosmith (with Gideon Smith & the Dixie Damned), 2000, Small Stone Records
- Sad Stories, (T&A), 2000
- The Mecklenburgers Soundtrack, 2005

== Trivia ==
- Carroll served as an exchange teacher at Southwestern University of Finance and Economics in Chengdu, The People's Republic of China.
- Carroll's song "Axe to Grind" (Lonely Stories From The One-Horse Town) was featured with a story about the Los Angeles riots of 1992 on the Voice of America Radio Network.
- Carroll was once in the contestant pool for Who Wants to Be a Millionaire.
- His reflections on REM's first record, Murmur (which Carroll has claimed as a great influence) appeared in a November 1992 issue of Rolling Stone magazine.
