= Doubting Thomas (Charlotte band) =

Doubting Thomas was a Rock/Americana band from Charlotte, North Carolina which performing from 1990 to 2001 and reunited for performances in 2003, 2009, 2022 and now touring in 2023 with a new recording coming out in 2024 called "Forever Changed" produced by Don Dixon of R.E.M producer of "Murmur".

== Before Doubting Thomas ==
Singer, actress and musician Gina Stewart grew up in the Washington, D.C. area and graduated from UNC-Charlotte in 1986. Her instruments included the guitar and banjo.

In the 1980s before Doubting Thomas, Stewart performed with Fetchin Bones, and she played bass with The Blind Dates along with Deanna Lynn CampbelL guitar and Penny Craver drums. The style of The Blind Dates included 60s girl pop and alternative rock compared to Throwing Muses, and was described as "the opposite of angst" years later. In one of their first performances at the July 1986 WDAV Battle of the Bands, Blind Dates defeated Southern Culture on the Skids. The band broke up after three years but reunited for one performance in 2004.

== Band history ==
Drummer Paul Andrews contacted Stewart when The Blind Dates broke up, and Doubting Thomas began. Brenda Gambill played violin and percussion, in addition to singing. The bass player was Glenn Kawamoto, and Dale Alderman played acoustic guitar. A 1990 Fayetteville Observer article said Stewart would write all the songs and sing, and that the band "will combine elements of music and theater."

In 1990, Doubting Thomas was selected for the North Carolina Music Showcase in Chapel Hill. Showcase selection committee chairman and music critic Jim Desmond compared the band to 10,000 Maniacs and Fleetwood Mac and called Doubting Thomas "the highlight of the festival". He said "The Chapel Hill crowd ... went wild over them. I predict that if they work at it, within six months they'll be the biggest band in the state." Desmond also said, "You`ve got really thoughtful lyrics and terrific harmonies with Gina and Brenda. Then they have a violin, which is unusual for that type of sound. Their bass player comes out of a jazz background. Their sound is extremely complex, rhythm-wise."

The first album by Doubting Thomas was Blue Angel, produced by John Keane. Peter Buck and Bill Berry of R.E.M. performed. Their second album, Two, included vocals by Emily Saliers of Indigo Girls on "Tiny Lights" and "How High". Stewart said in a 1994 interview that Blue Angel sold well in North Carolina, but the band had not tried to get a major label interested in them.

The band's third album Cut It Out, a compilation of earlier recordings plus a few new tracks, was released in 1997. The band included Stewart on lead vocals, Gambill on vocals, violin, harmonica and percussion, Bill Carroll on bass and Mark McColl on drums. In 1998, Doubting Thomas was named "Most Deserving of National Attention" by readers of Creative Loafing.

The band's fifth album Who Died and Made You King?, also produced by Keane, had a style described by Yon Lambert of The State of Columbia, South Carolina as "Indigo Girls-styled sweetness through electrocharged rural blues." Stewart called it "more soulful and Motown-influenced than anything else we've done so far."

Late in 1999, Matthew Davenport joined on drums, and Bryan Williams was added as keyboardist. Timothy Hill replaced Irwin "Virgil" Bostian on guitar.

Of the original members, only Stewart and Gambill remained when Doubting Thomas released a live album in 2000. The band had six members who had played together for a year, and they were performing rock music, not the acoustic sound the band had to begin with.

The last official performance by Doubting Thomas took place January 13, 2001. Tonya Jameson of The Charlotte Observer said the band "consistently delivered well-crafted pop-rock tunes that have earned it a faithful following."

Doubting Thomas reunited for one performance in 2002, and for more in 2009 and 2010. Davenport and McColl subbed on drums, and Bostian played guitar and Carroll played bass. The band was also listed among performers for the Atlanta Pride Festival in 2009.

== Gina Stewart's acting career ==
While attending UNCC, Stewart found she could not get a degree in bass guitar, so she began studying dance and drama. She acted in a CPCC company as well as her own company. She had numerous roles in the Tarradiddle Players, which became part of Children's Theater of Charlotte, and Charlotte Shakespeare Company. In 1990 she was called "one of the area`s most visible stage actresses." After a year and a half of not acting, in January 1994, Stewart was appearing in Charlotte in the one-woman show The Search for Signs of Intelligent Life in the Universe. Stewart has had small roles in Dawson's Creek and Walker: Texas Ranger and in the movie The Rage: Carrie 2.

== Bill Carroll ==
As solo artist, Bill Carroll scored a Rate-A-Record appearance on Dick Clark's American Bandstand program on April 2, 1988.

== Volatile Baby ==
Stewart, Gambill and Allison Modafferi formed the acoustic folk-rock band Volatile Baby (also called Volatile Baby!). Their first album Traveling Light in May 2006 included contributions from Carlene Carter, Kathy Mattea's drummer Jim Brock, and Don Dixon, who produced the album and said "Volatile Baby sounds like The Carter Family and The Roches decided to team up and record a bunch of newly discovered Graham Parsons songs." The band performed in Wildwood Flowers: The June Carter Cash Story, a stage musical in which Stewart played Mother Maybelle Carter, and their album Backroads included "Will the Circle Be Unbroken?" and "Ring of Fire".

== Jonesalee ==
Stewart, using the name Gina Jones, formed the duo Jonesalee with Gambill on fiddle to honor Mother Maybelle Carter. Also playing with them in March 2011 were Heidi Dove (guitar) and Earleen Hicks (guitar/bass).
