= The Incredulity of Saint Thomas (Stom) =

Painting by Matthias Stom

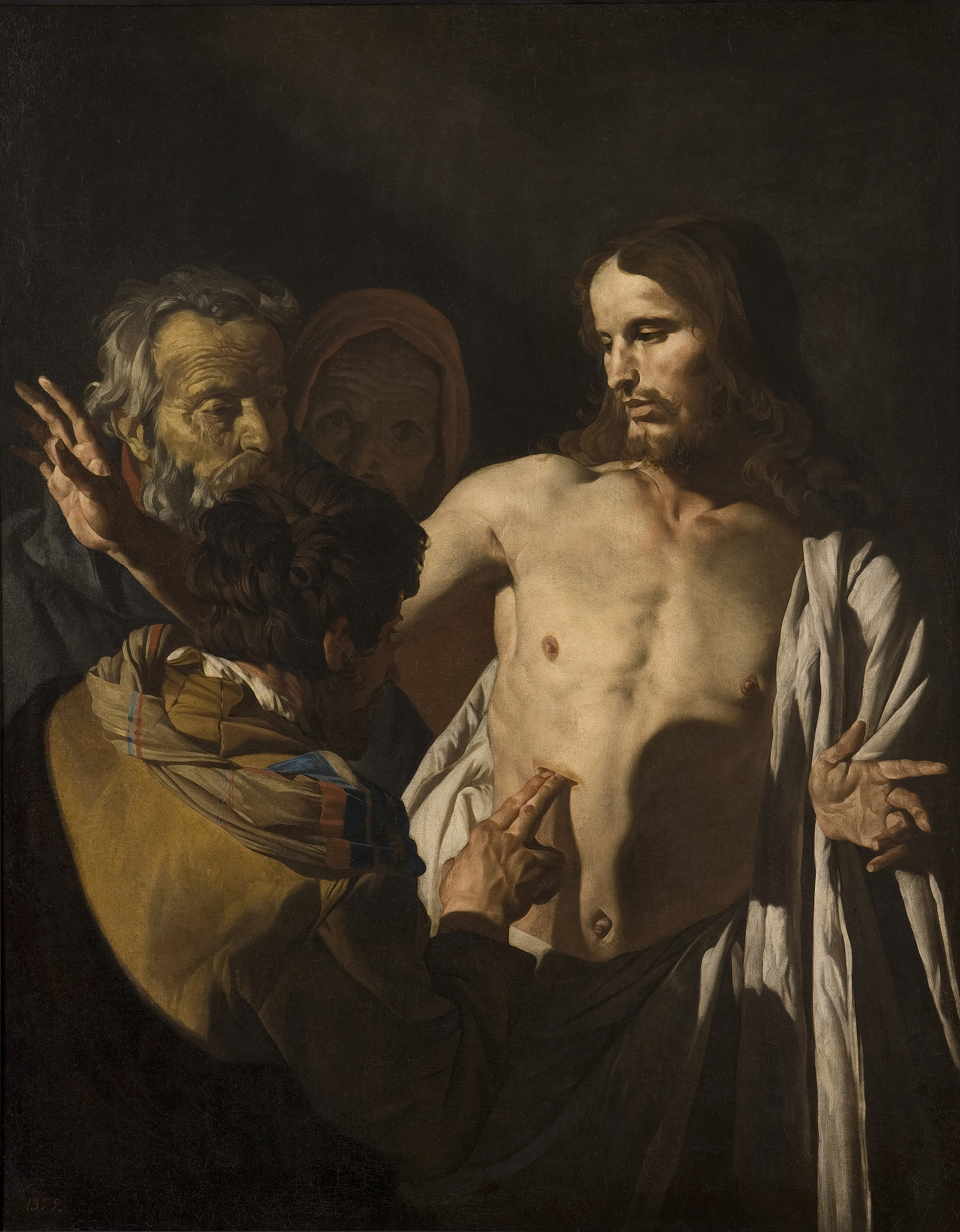
- Artist: Matthias Stom
- Year: c. 1640–1649
- Medium: Oil on canvas
- Dimensions: 125 cm × 99 cm (49 in × 39 in)
- Location: Museo del Prado; Madrid

The Incredulity of Saint Thomas is an oil painting on canvas by the Dutch artist Matthias Stom, created c. 1640–1649. It is held in the Museo del Prado, in Madrid.

== History ==
Another version of the subject by the same artist is in the Baron Scotti collection in Bergamo; both were produced during the artist's time on Sicily. The Prado version's composition is influenced by those of Hendrick ter Brugghen's Doubting Thomas of c. 1621–1623 (Rijksmuseum, Amsterdam) and Rubens's Incredulity of Saint Thomas of 1613–1615 (Royal Museum of Fine Arts, Antwerp).

The work first appeared in the written record as one of the paintings listed as saved from the 1734 fire at the Royal Alcázar of Madrid; at that time it was thought to be a copy of an original by Guercino. Another inventory of 1772, this time of the Royal Palace in Madrid, re-attributed it as an autograph work by Stom's teacher Gerard van Honthorst. This misattribution which survived until 1963, when the work was reassigned to Hendrick ter Brugghen. Arthur von Schneider first suggested Stom as the work's artist and many years later, in 1985, a catalogue finally restored this attribution.

== Description ==
The painting depicts the moment when, according to the Gospel of John, the Apostle Thomas, who doubted that Jesus Christ had been raised from the death, had to put his hand on His wound, and finally was able to believe in the resurrection. Thomas' face isn't entirely visible to the viewers, as he contemplates and puts his fingers in the wound. Two people are depicted at the left, a man, possibly another of the Apostles, and a woman, both of old age.

== See also ==
- List of paintings by Matthias Stom
