= Van Hemessen =

Van Hemessen is a surname. Notable people with the surname include:

- Catharina van Hemessen (1528–after 1565), Flemish painter, daughter of Jan
- Jan Sanders van Hemessen (c. 1500–c. 1566), Flemish painter
