= List of paintings by Catharina van Hemessen =

The following is a list of works by Catharina van Hemessen that are generally accepted as autograph by the RKD and other sources.

| Image | Title | Year | Dimensions | Inventory nr. | Gallery | Location |
|---|---|---|---|---|---|---|
| | Self-portrait | 1548 | 31 cm x 24.5 cm | 1361 | Kunstmuseum Basel | Basel |
| | Portrait of a 22-year-old woman playing the spinet | 1548 | 32 cm x 26 cm | WRM 654 | Wallraf-Richartz-Museum | Cologne |
| | Portrait of a woman, probably a self-portrait | 1548 | 24 cm x 17 cm | SK-A-4256 | Rijksmuseum | Amsterdam |
| | Portrait of a 30-year-old woman | 1549 | 22 cm x 17 cm | 4157 | Royal Museums of Fine Arts of Belgium | Brussels |
| | Portrait of a 42-year-old man | 1549 | 22 cm x 17 cm | 4156 | Royal Museums of Fine Arts of Belgium | Brussels |
| | Portrait of a young woman with a dog | ca. 1550 | 31.8 x 24.7 cm | | Snijders&Rockox House | Antwerp |
| | Portrait of a woman | 1551 | 40.9 cm x 30.1 cm | B.M.147 | Bowes Museum | Barnard Castle |
| | Portrait of a woman with a dog | 1551 | 22.9 cm x 17.8 cm | NG 4732 | National Gallery | London |
| | Predella of the 'Tendilla Retablo' | 1550s | | 1953.219 | Cincinnati Art Museum | Cincinnati |
| | Portrait of a woman | 1550s | 33 cm x 25 cm | 269 | Fitzwilliam Museum | London |
| | Portrait of a 3-year-old child with a bird | 1559 | 19.7 cm x 14.6 cm | | Private collection | |
| | Portrait of a Young Lady | 1560 | 30.5 cm × 22.9 cm | 1951.397 | Baltimore Museum of Art | Baltimore |

== Sources ==
- Catharina van Hemessen in the RKD
