= The Surgeon =

The Surgeon may refer to:

== Literature ==
- The Surgeon, a 1967 novel by Vincent Brome
- The Surgeon (novel), a 2001 novel by Tess Gerritsen
- The Surgeon, a 2003 novel by Kate Bridges

== Television ==
- The Surgeon (TV series), a 2005 Australian television medical drama
- "The Surgeon", Douglas Fairbanks Presents season 1, episode 6 (1953)
- "The Surgeon", Planet of the Apes episode 7 (1974)
- "The Surgeon", Tales of the Unexpected series 9, episode 3 (1988)
- "The Surgeon", The Adventures of William Tell episode 23 (1959)
- "The Surgeon", The Haves and the Have Nots season 5, episode 37 (2019)

== Other uses ==
- The Surgeon (painting), a 16th-century painting by Jan Sanders van Hemessen
- The Surgeon (video game), a 1985 video game
- The Surgeon (film), a 2026 thriller

== See also ==
- Surgeon (disambiguation)
