= Surgeon (disambiguation) =

A surgeon is a person who performs surgery.

Surgeon or Surgeons may also refer to:

== Medical doctor ==
- Surgeon General (disambiguation), various high-ranking medical officials
- In military usage, a unit's assigned physician (who may not be an "operating" surgeon per se)
  - Flight surgeon, Ship's surgeon, etc.
  - Barber surgeon, a common European medical practitioners of the Middle Ages

== Nickname ==
- Surgeon (musician), the moniker of British electronic music producer and DJ Anthony Child
- Surgeon, the moniker of Alexander Zaldastanov, Russian biker

== Other ==
- Surgeon Island, Antarctica
- Surgeons (TV series), 2017 Chinese TV series

== See also ==
- The Surgeon (disambiguation)
- Surgeonfish
- Sturgeon, 26 species of fish
