= Self-Portrait by Catharina van Hemessen =

Painting by Catharina van Hemessen

Self-Portrait
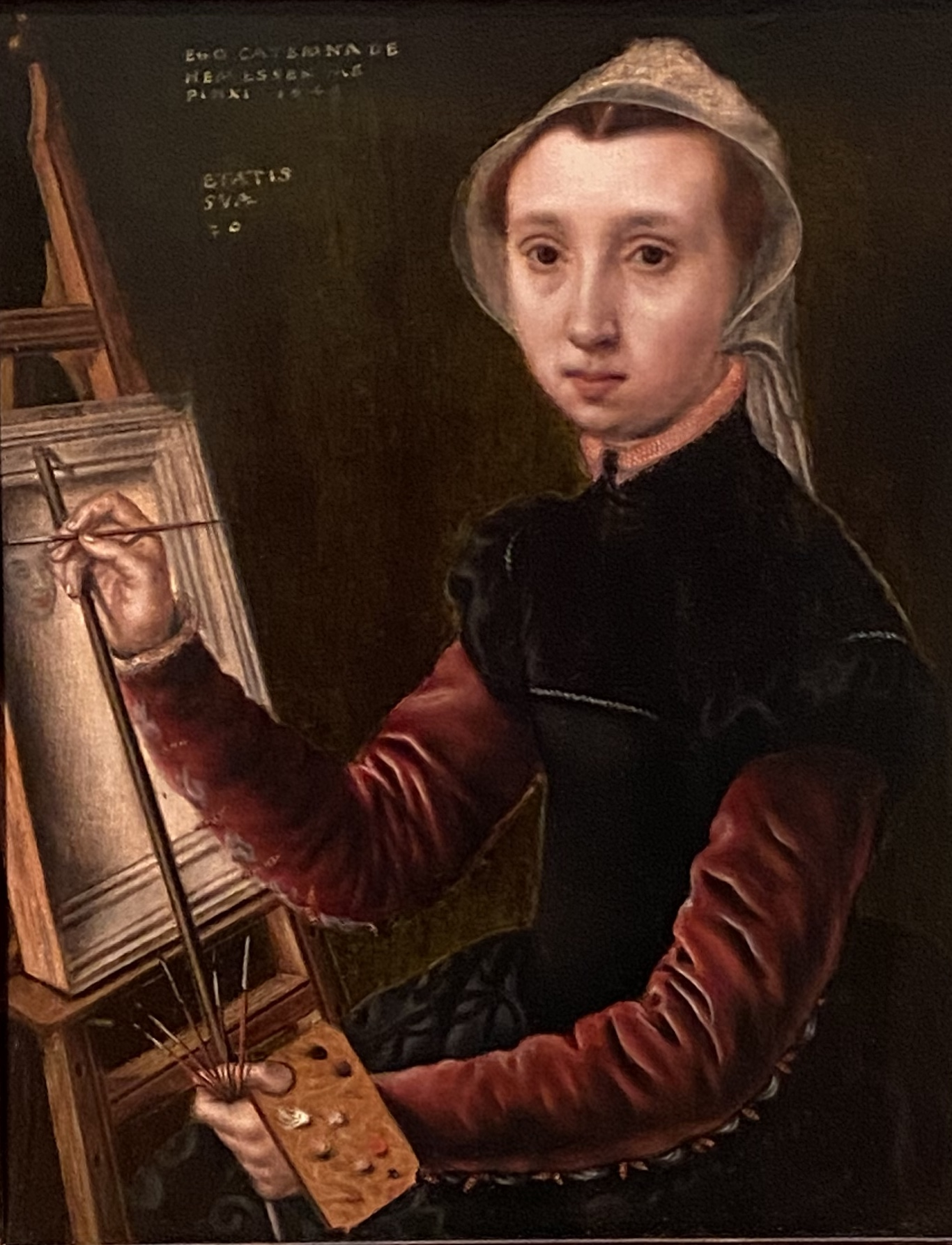
- Artist: Catharina van Hemessen
- Year: 1548
- Type: Oil on panel
- Dimensions: 30.8 cm × 24.4 cm (12.1 in × 9.6 in)
- Location: Kunstmuseum Basel, Basel, Switzerland

Self-Portrait is an oil on oak self-portrait executed by the Flemish Renaissance artist Catharina van Hemessen in 1548 when she was 20 years old. The portrait earned the artist a considerable reputation. It is significant for being one of the earliest paintings not only of a female of the early modern era but also of an artist in the act of painting. While self-portraits were common at the time, only a few, like those of Albrecht Dürer (d. 1528), showed the artist's everyday life. Artists of the time rarely directly referred to, much less showed the tools of their profession. It is assumed the portrait is one of the earliest to show a painter with a brush together with a palette and an easel.

Van Hemessen signed the panel in Latin: "EGO CATERINA DE/ HEMESSEN ME / PINXI 1548 // ETATIS SVAE/ 20" (In English: "I Catharina van Hemessen painted myself / 1548 / Her age 20". The painting is in the collection of the Kunstmuseum Basel.

== Description ==
Van Hemessen is shown at half-length and holding a brush, looking outwards as if at her own image as she records it on the oak panel in front of her. She has only begun work on the depicted painting, no background has been put down, and only a sketch of her head can be seen. Her face is painted with soft brush strokes, while the textures of her gown are distinguished using a wider variety of brushmarks.

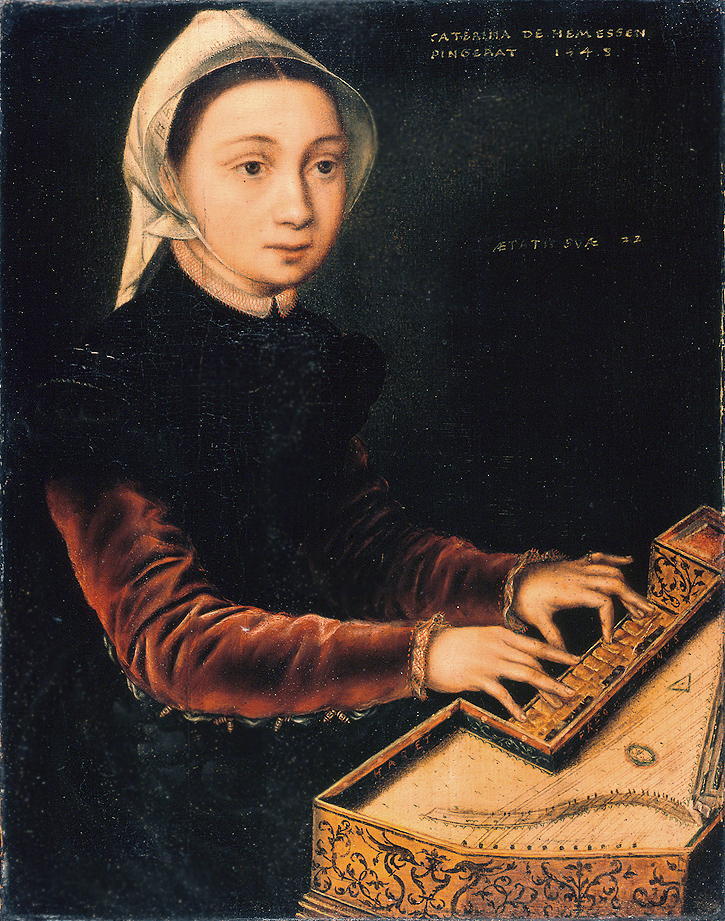
Girl at the Virginal, presumed pendant portrait

In the main image, the artist has shown herself elegantly clothed in a black brocade dress with red velvet sleeves. While such an outfit would have been impractical for an artist working with oils and brushes, her clothes are intended to indicate her social rank and attribute personal dignity. Her arms are outsized in proportion to the rest of her body.

There are a number of deliberate contradictions and explorations of mirror images at play. Van Hemessen holds the brush with her right hand suggesting she has reversed the image of herself that she would have seen in the mirror. Her head, as shown on the panel that she is apparently working on, is undersized and situated on the top left. That is opposite to the position her head appears in the portrait painting. Her head is turned in the direction of the viewer, but her eyes do not meet ours. Typical of her work, the background is plain and dark and gives no indication of the space occupied by the sitter.

A number of obstacles stood in the way of contemporary women who wished to become painters. Chief amongst these was that their training would involve both the dissection of cadavers and the study of the nude male form. In addition, the system of apprenticeship meant that the aspiring artist would need to live with an older artist for 4–5 years, often beginning from the age of 9–15. For these reasons, female artists were extremely rare, and those that did make it through were typically trained by a close relative, in van Hemessen's case, by her father.

== Attribution ==
While some have speculated that the work was created by Catharina's father, the prominent painter Jan Sanders van Hemessen (1500 – c. 1566), who portrayed women with the same large round and dark eyes and reduced chin, the prominence of the signature is generally regarded as evidence that the work was by her own hand.

== Pendant ==
A panel by van Hemessen in the Wallraf-Richartz-Museum in Cologne (inv. 654) from the same year and of the same size depicting a young woman playing the virginal probably depicts Catharina's sister Christina, two years her senior. It likely was made as a counterpart to the self-portrait.

== Other versions ==
Two almost identical versions exist of the self-portrait in the Kunstmuseum Basel, both attributed to Catharina herself. One is in the Hermitage Museum, Saint Petersburg and the other is in the Iziko South African National Gallery, Capetown.

== Sources ==
- Jones, Susan Frances. Van Eyck to Gossaert. London: National Gallery, 2011. ISBN 978-1-85709-504-3
- Kemperdick, Stephan. The Early Portrait, from the Collection of the Prince of Liechtenstein and the Kunstmuseum Basel. Munich: Prestel, 2006. ISBN 3-7913-3598-7
- Kleiner, Fred. Gardner's Art Through the Ages. Wadsworth, 2009. ISBN 0-495-57364-7
