= Cutting the Stone =

15th-century painting by Hieronymus Bosch

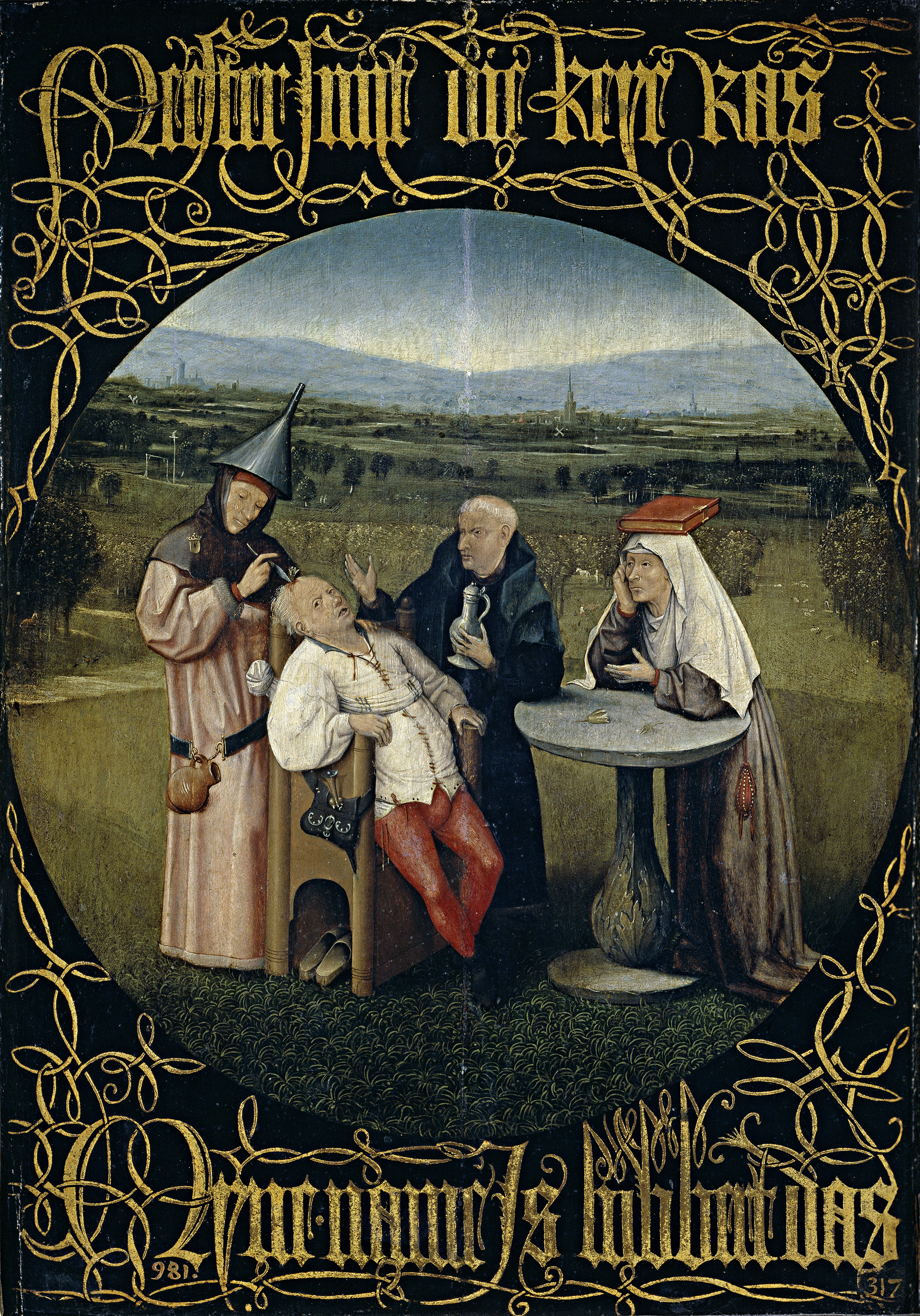
- Artist: Hieronymus Bosch
- Year: c. 1494 or later
- Type: Oil on board
- Dimensions: 48 cm × 35 cm (19 in × 14 in)
- Location: Museo del Prado; Madrid

Cutting the Stone, also called The Extraction of the Stone of Madness or The Cure of Folly, is an oil-on-panel painting completed c.1494 or later by the Dutch painter Hieronymus Bosch. It is now in the Museo del Prado in Madrid.

The painting depicts a surgeon, wearing a funnel hat, removing the stone of madness from a patient's head by trepanation. An assistant, a monk bearing a tankard, stands nearby. Playing on the double-meaning of the word kei (stone or bulb), the stone appears as a flower bulb, while another flower rests on the table. A woman with a book balanced on her head looks on.

The inscription in gold-coloured Gothic script reads:

(Middle Dutch):
Meester snyt die keye ras
Myne name Is lubbert Das

(English):
Master, cut the stone out, fast.
My name is Lubbert Das.

Lubbert Das was a comical (foolish) character in Dutch literature.

== Interpretations ==
It is possible that the flower hints that the doctor is a charlatan as does the funnel hat. The woman balancing a book on her head is thought by Skemer to be a satire of the Flemish custom of wearing amulets made out of books and scripture, a pictogram for the word phylactery. Otherwise, she is thought to depict folly.

== See also ==
- List of paintings by Hieronymus Bosch
