= Stone of madness =

Hypothetical stone in medieval folklore

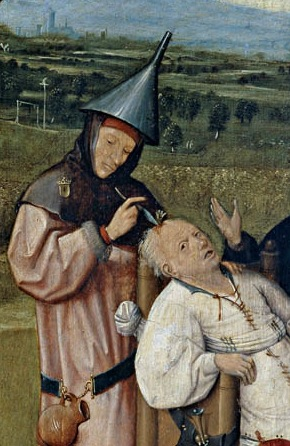
Hieronymus Bosch, The Extraction of the Stone of Madness

The stone of madness, also called stone of folly, was a hypothetical stone in a patient's head, thought to be the cause of madness, idiocy or dementia. From the 15th century onwards, removing the stone by trepanation was proposed as a remedy. This procedure is demonstrated in the painting The Extraction of the Stone of Madness by Hieronymus Bosch.

== Gallery ==
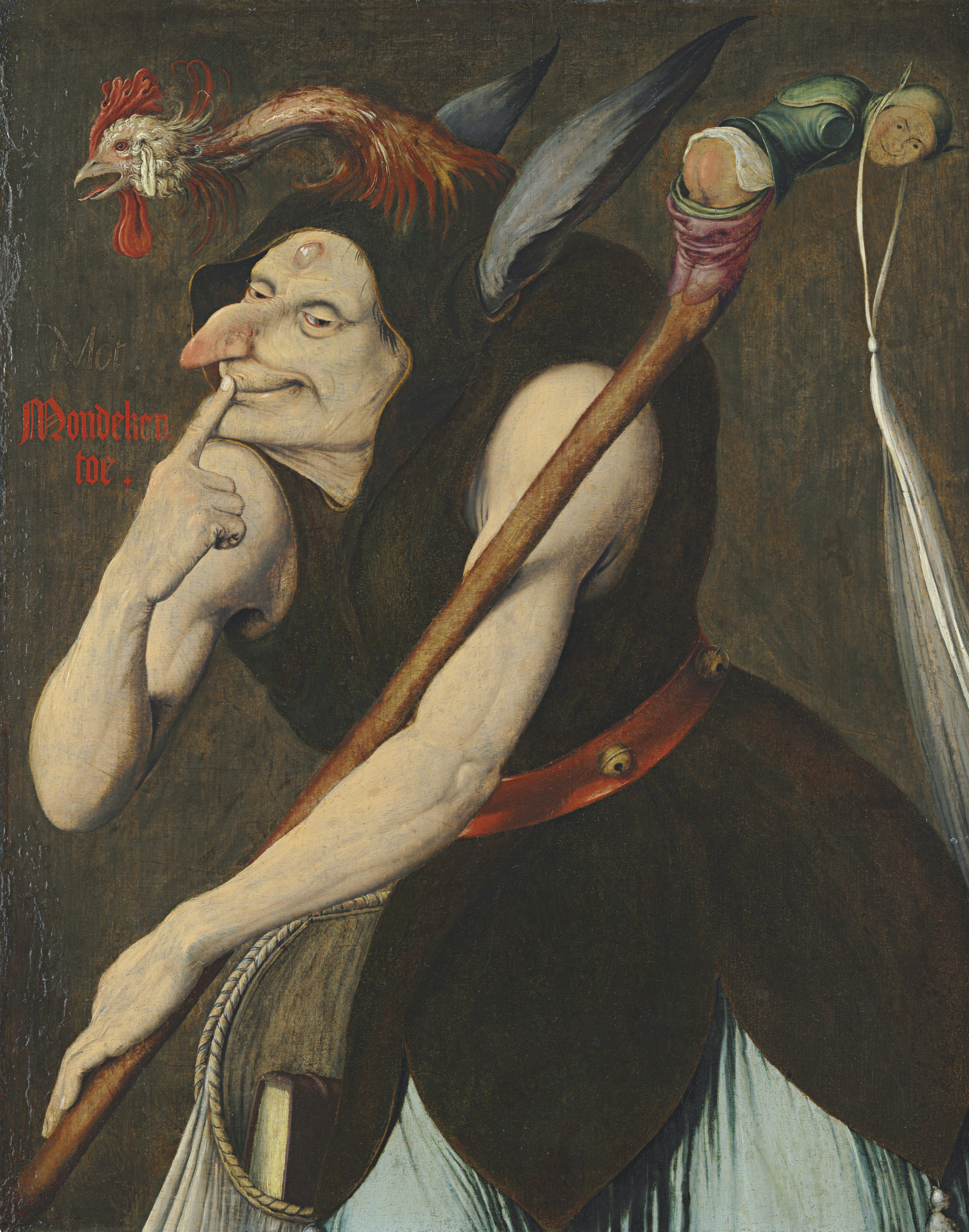
Quentin Massys, An Allegory of Folly (early 16th century). The fool has a "stone of folly" in his forehead.

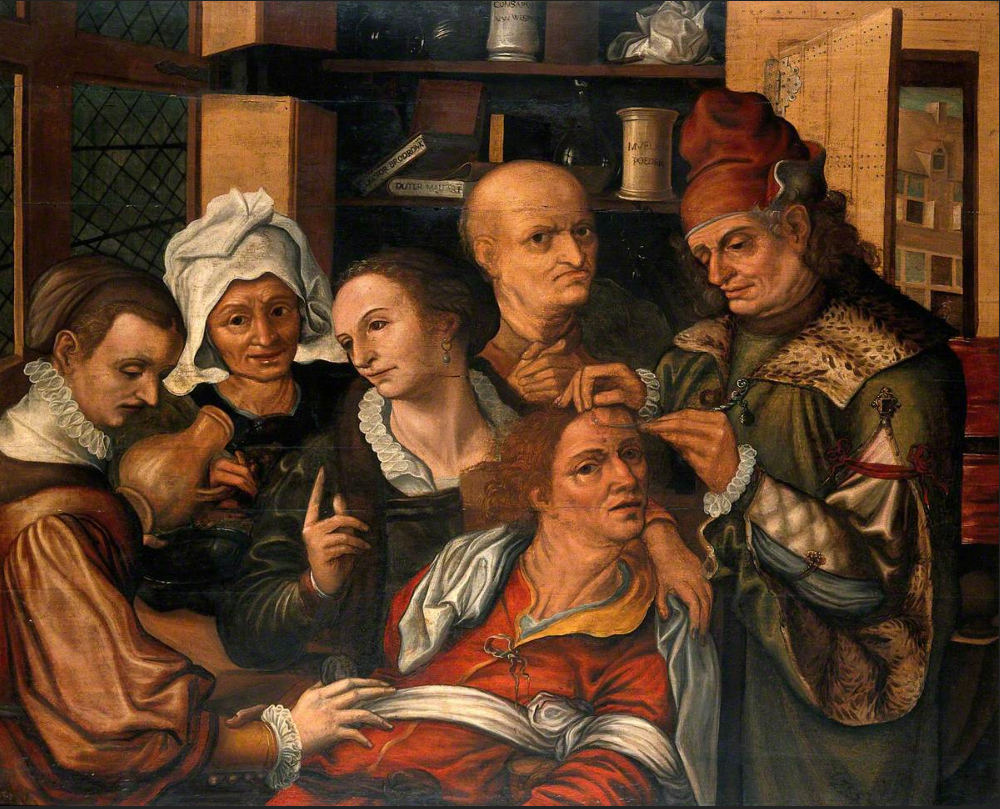
Pieter Huys, A surgeon extracting the stone of folly

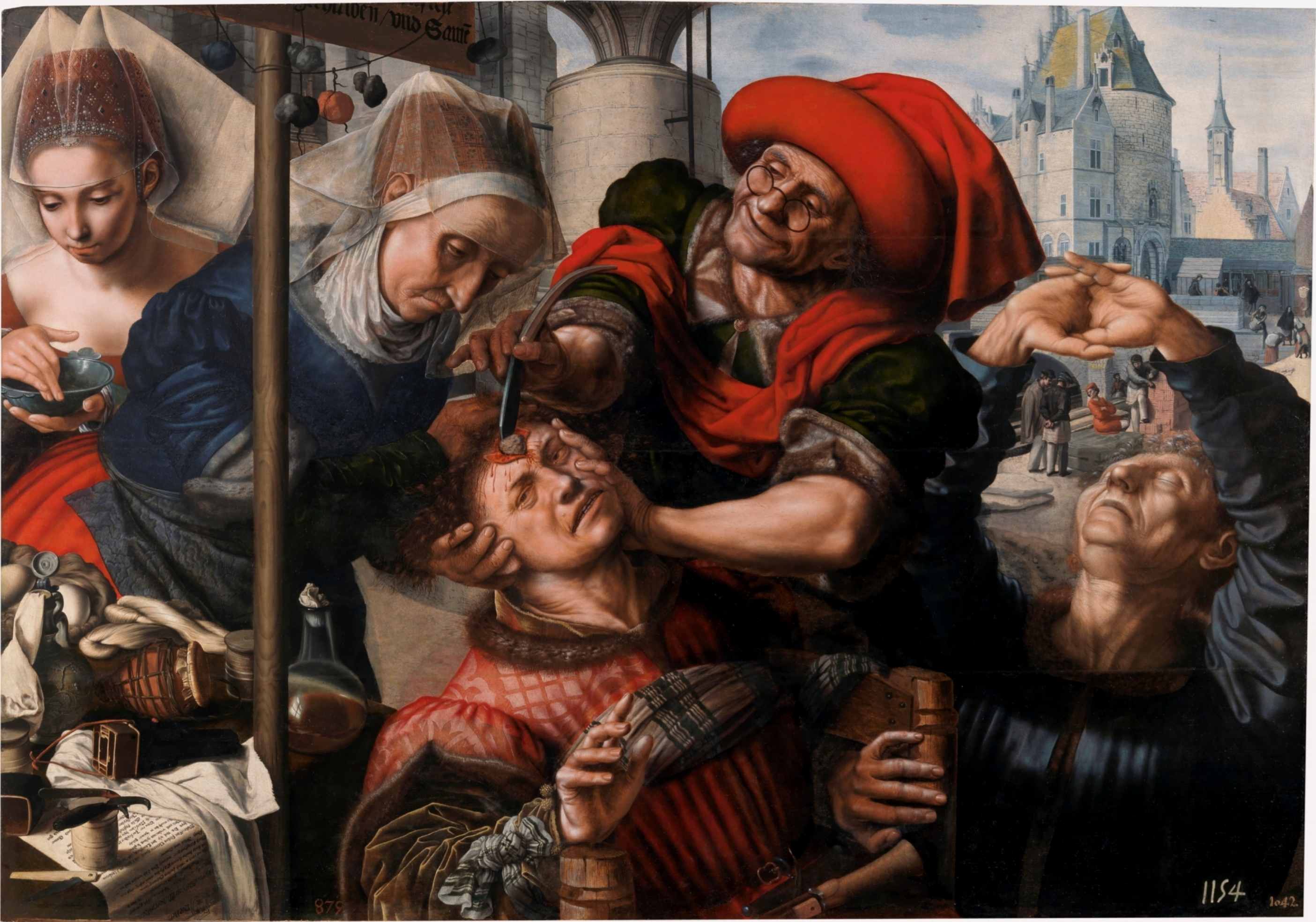
Jan Sanders van Hemessen, 1550s

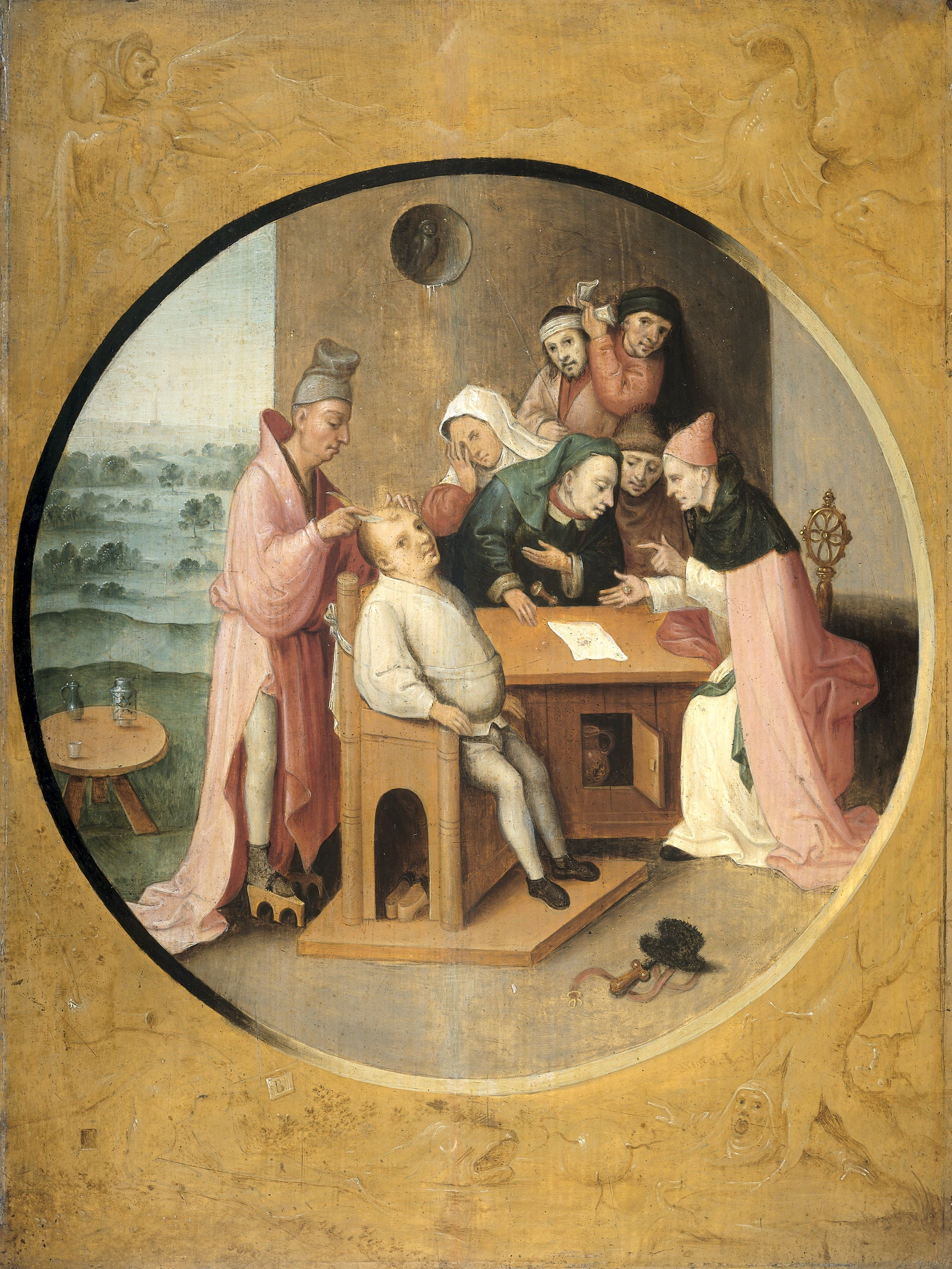
After Hieronymus Bosch, 16th century

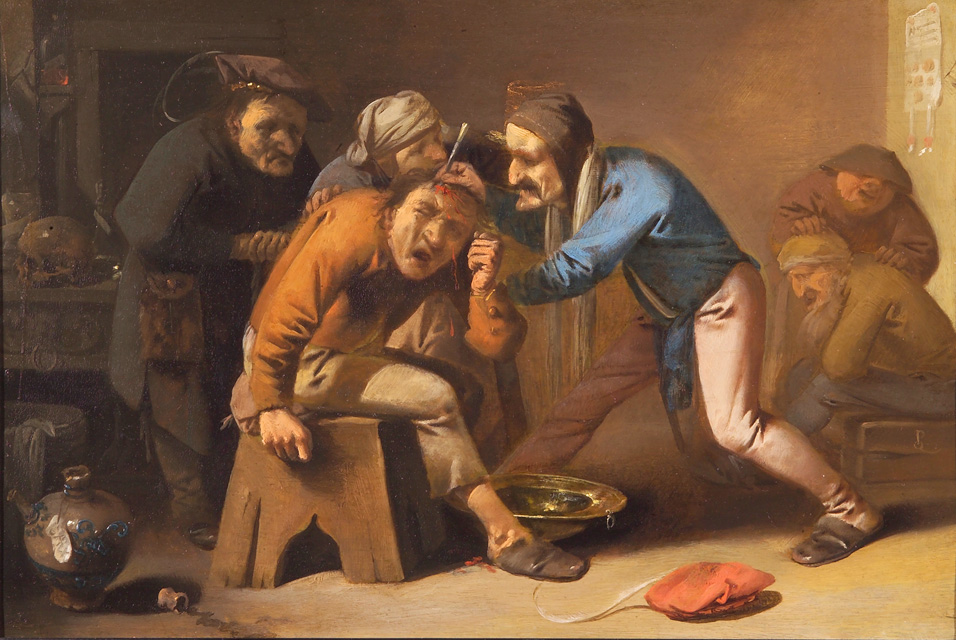
Pieter Jansz. Quast,
Die Steinoperation, ca 1630
