= The Prodigal Son (van Hemessen) =

Painting by Jan Sanders van Hemessen

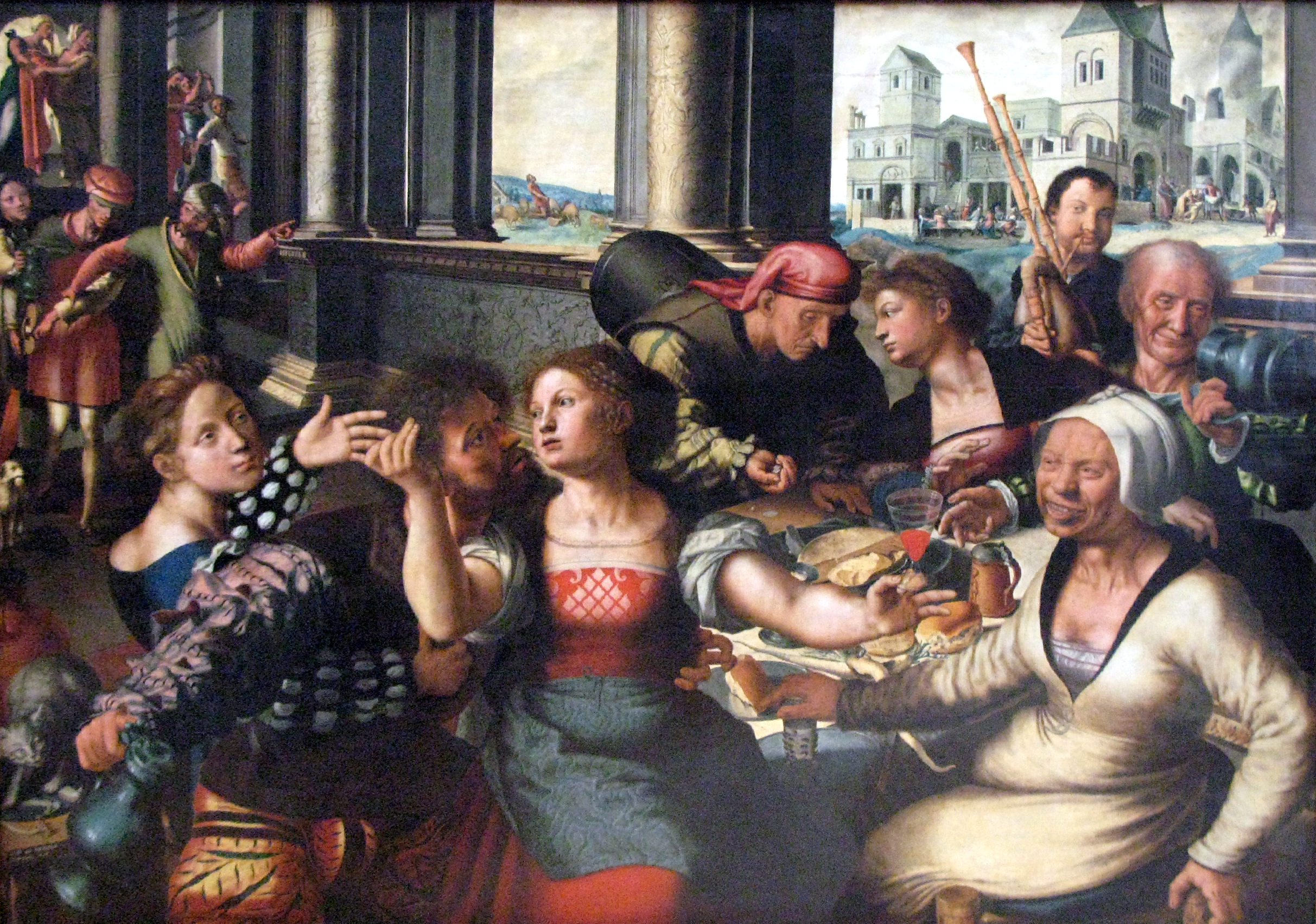
- Artist: Jan Sanders van Hemessen
- Year: 1536
- Medium: oil on oak panel
- Dimensions: 140 cm × 198 cm (55 in × 78 in)
- Location: Royal Museums of Fine Arts of Belgium, Brussels

The Prodigal Son is a 1536 Mannerist oil on oak panel painting by the Brabant painter Jan Sanders van Hemessen. It shows the New Testament parable of the Prodigal Son and has been in the collections of the Royal Museums of Fine Arts of Belgium since 1881.

The foreground of the composition shows the prodigal son during his days of high living in the company of prostitutes, music, wine and gambling. In the background through the open window one can discern a scene of the prodigal son living among the swine after he has fallen on hard times and the scene of his reunion with his father who forgives him. The composition clearly carries a moral lesson by showing that one needs to see beyond the earthly pleasures depicted in the foreground to find the path of redemption, which is shown in the background.
