= The Surgeon (painting) =

16th-century painting by Jan Sanders van Hemessen

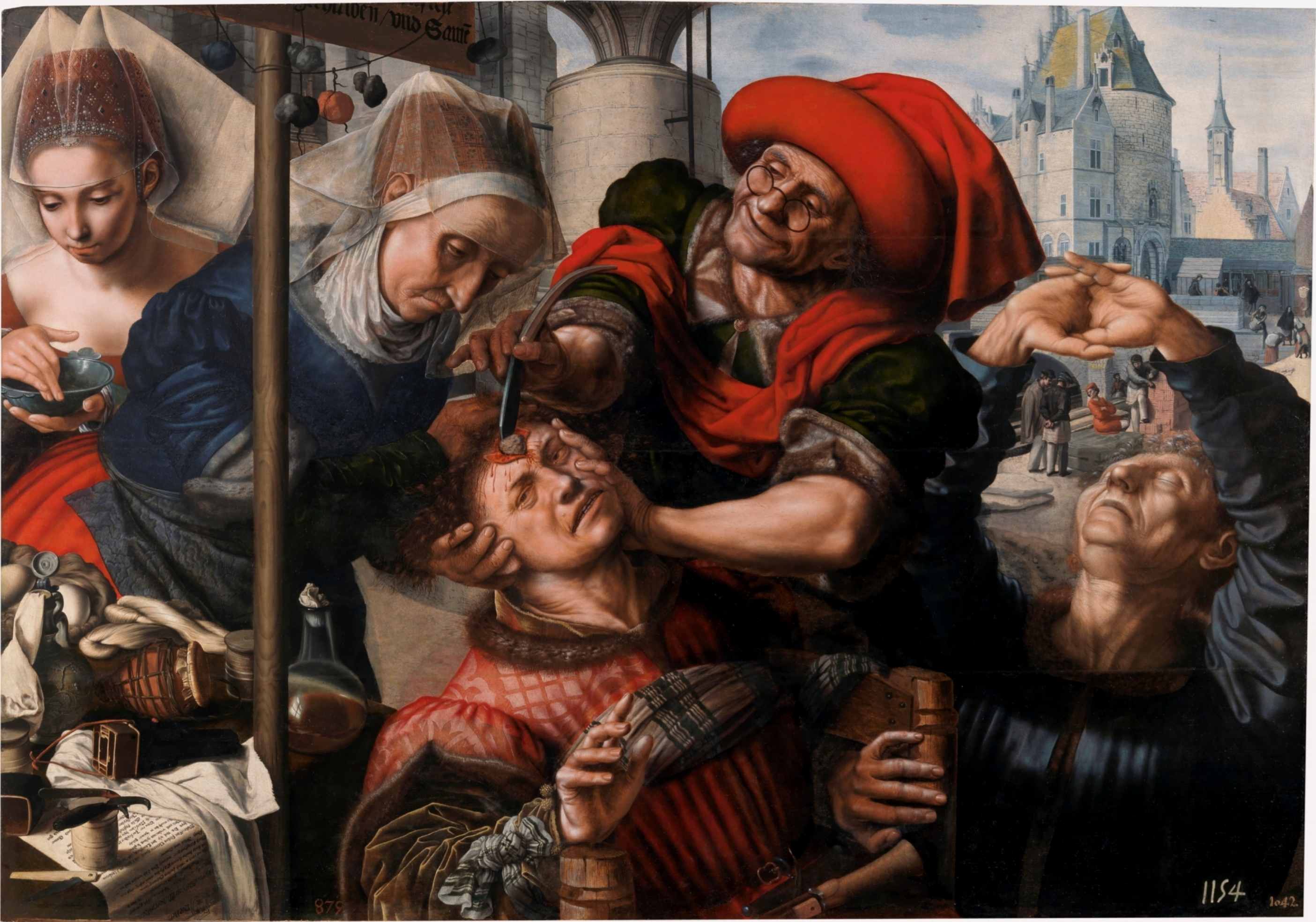

The Surgeon or The Village Surgeon is a c.1550-1555 oil on panel painting by Jan Sanders van Hemessen. It was first catalogued in 1614 in the Spanish royal collection at the El Pardo Palace. It is now in the Prado Museum in Madrid. It shows a barber surgeon carrying out a trepanation.
