= Catharina van Hemessen =

Flemish Renaissance painter

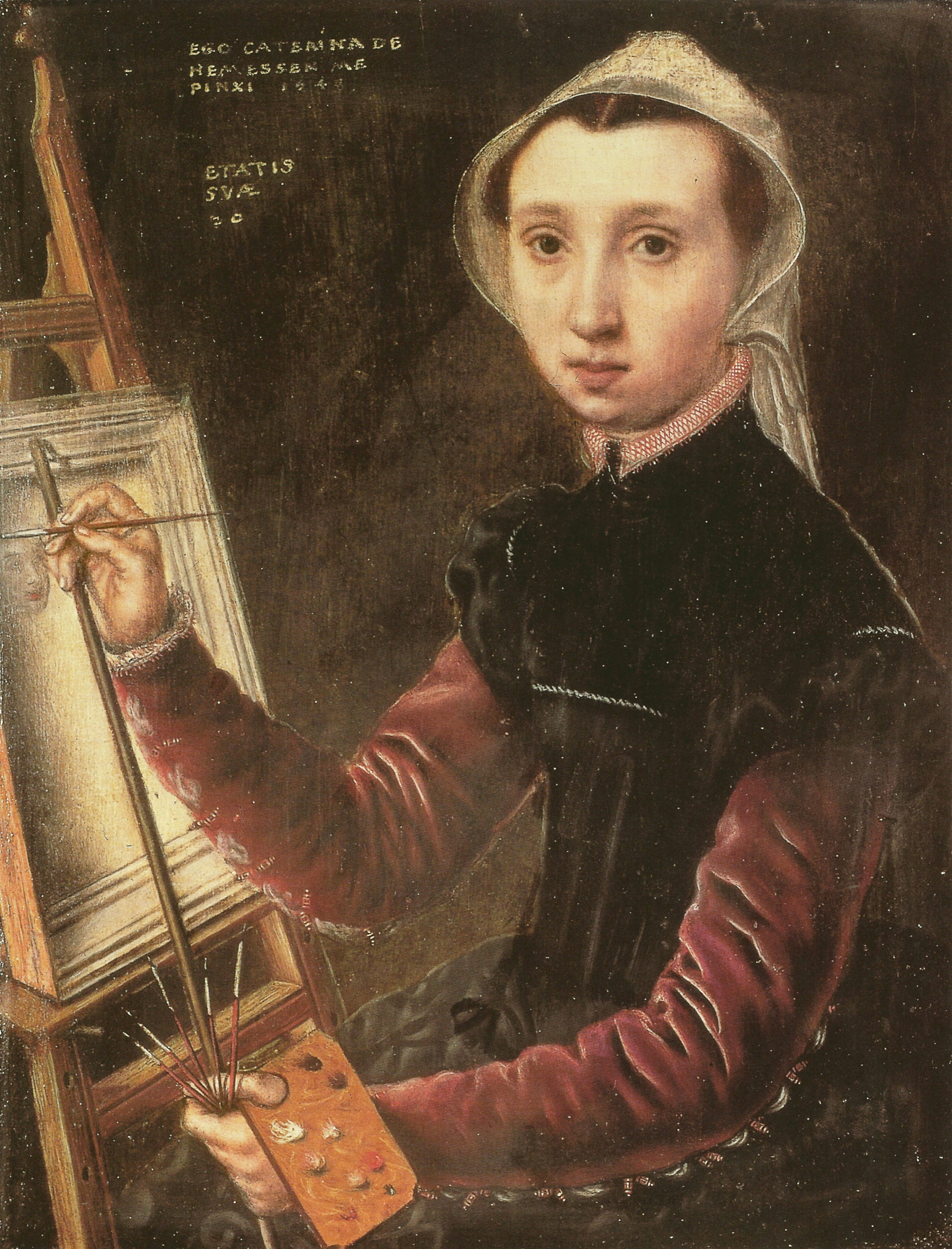
- Self portrait, 1548. This self-portrait may be the first self-portrait of an artist at work at the easel, regardless of gender.
- Born: 1528
- Died: after 1565
- Known for: portrait painting, some religious
- Movement: Northern Renaissance
- Spouse: Christian de Morien
- Parent: Jan Sanders van Hemessen
- Relatives: Christina van Hemessen
- Patrons: Maria of Austria

Caterina or Catharina van Hemessen (1528 – after 1565) was a Flemish Renaissance painter. She is the earliest female Flemish painter for whom there is verifiable extant work. She is mainly known for a series of small-scale portraits of women completed between the late 1540s and early 1550s as well as a few religious compositions.

Van Hemessen is often given the distinction of creating the first self-portrait of an artist depicted at an easel. Her self-portrait, created in 1548 at the age of 20, shows the artist holding a maulstick as she starts work on a painting. The image is in the collection of the Kunstmuseum Basel. Other paintings by Van Hemessen are in the Rijksmuseum in Amsterdam and in the National Gallery, London.

Few women were able to become professional artists during the early modern period in western art, largely because they were denied access to artistic education, systems of mentorship, and professional organizations. Artistic training, which could involve both the dissection of cadavers and the study of the nude male figure, and systems of apprenticeship could require that an aspiring artist would need to live with an older artist for four to five years, often beginning from the age of nine to 15. For these reasons, female artists were extremely rare, and those that did make it were typically trained by a close relative, as in Van Hemessen's case, by her father, Jan Sanders van Hemessen.

An exhibition highlighting the work of Catharina and her father took place in Belgium at the Snijders and Rockoxhuis Museum in 2026.

== Life ==
Van Hemessen was the daughter of Jan Sanders van Hemessen (c. 1500-after 1563), a prominent Mannerist painter in Antwerp who had studied in Italy. Her father is believed to have been her teacher and she likely collaborated with him on many of his paintings. It is now thought that some of her brothers, Hans, Gilles and Peter, might also have been artists, whilst other relatives worked as musicians. She became a master in the Guild of Saint Luke in Antwerp and was the teacher of three students.

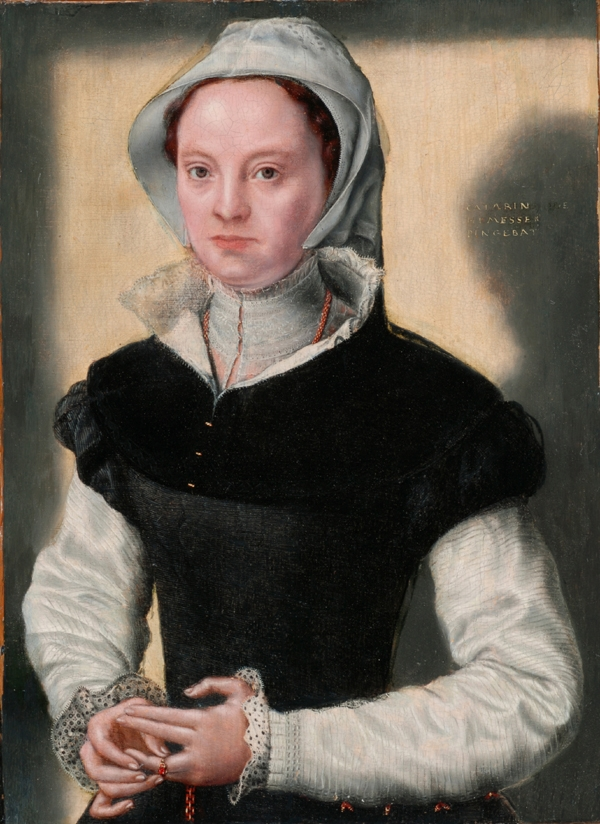
A Lady in Sixteenth-Century Costume, c. 1548–1549. Bowes Museum, County Durham

Van Hemessen was a successful painter in her lifetime. She gained an important patron in the 1540s in the person of Maria of Austria, who served as regent of the Low Countries on behalf of her brother Charles V. In 1554, van Hemessen married Christian de Morien, an organist at the Antwerp Cathedral, which was an important position at that time. In 1556, when Maria of Austria returned to Spain, Catharina and her husband moved there, at the invitation of her patron. Two years later, when Maria died, Catharina was given a sizeable pension for life. Catharina and her husband returned to Antwerp where they are recorded in 1561. At that time the couple was childless. Her husband received an appointment to work in 's-Hertogenbosch and the couple moved there around 1565.

In her lifetime, she was mentioned by two Italian artist biographers, Lodovico Guicciardini in his Description of the Low Countries of 1567 and Giorgio Vasari in his Vite of 1568.

Van Hemessen died in 1565/68, possibly in childbirth.

== Work ==
While van Hemessen did create at least two religious paintings, she was mainly a portraitist. Eight small portraits and two religious pictures, with dates between 1548 and 1552, bearing her signature have survived. She portrayed ostensibly wealthy men and women often posed against a dark background. The delicate figures she painted have a graceful charm and are provided with stylish costumes and accessories. Her best-known work is her self-portrait (Kunstmuseum Basel), inscribed in Latin: "I Caterina van Hemessen have painted myself / 1548 / Her age 20". Also in 1548, she painted Girl at the Virginal which may have been a portrait of her sister Christina. It is thought that her self-portrait and Girl at the Virginal were a pair to be hung together.

Van Hemessen's portraits are characterized by their realism. The one self-portrait and the half a dozen other portraits that have been attributed to her are small, quiet pictures. The sitters, often seated, were usually portrayed against a dark or neutral ground, their gazes rarely meeting the viewer's eyes. This type of framing and setting made for an intimate and dignified portrait.

She produced religious compositions which are considered less successful than her portraits.

There are no extant works later than 1554, which has led some historians to believe her artistic career might have ended after her marriage, which was common in the case of female artists. Although she retired, Catharina still taught three male apprentices.

== Selected works ==
- Portrait of a Lady, 1551, National Gallery, London
- Portrait of a Lady in 16th Century Dress, Bowes Museum
- Young Woman Playing the Virginals, 1548, Cologne, Wallraf-Richartz Museum

== Exhibition ==
The Snijders&Rockox House will show the first exhibition of van Hemessen's collected works 15 October 2026 - 31 January 2027, followed by a second show at the National Gallery in London from 4 March – 30 May 2027.

== Gallery ==
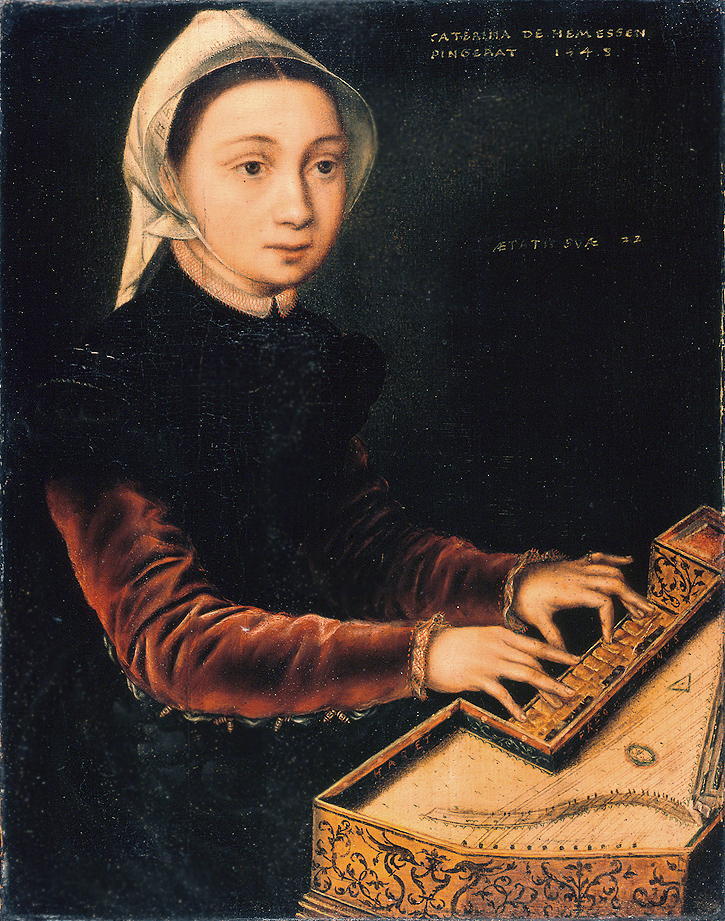
Girl at the Virginal, 1548, Possibly a self portrait or of her sister

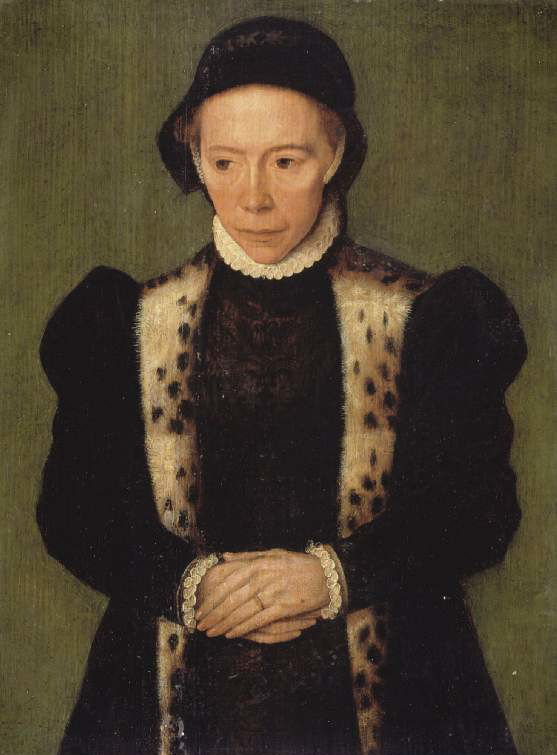
Portrait of a Woman, c. 1540s-early 1550s

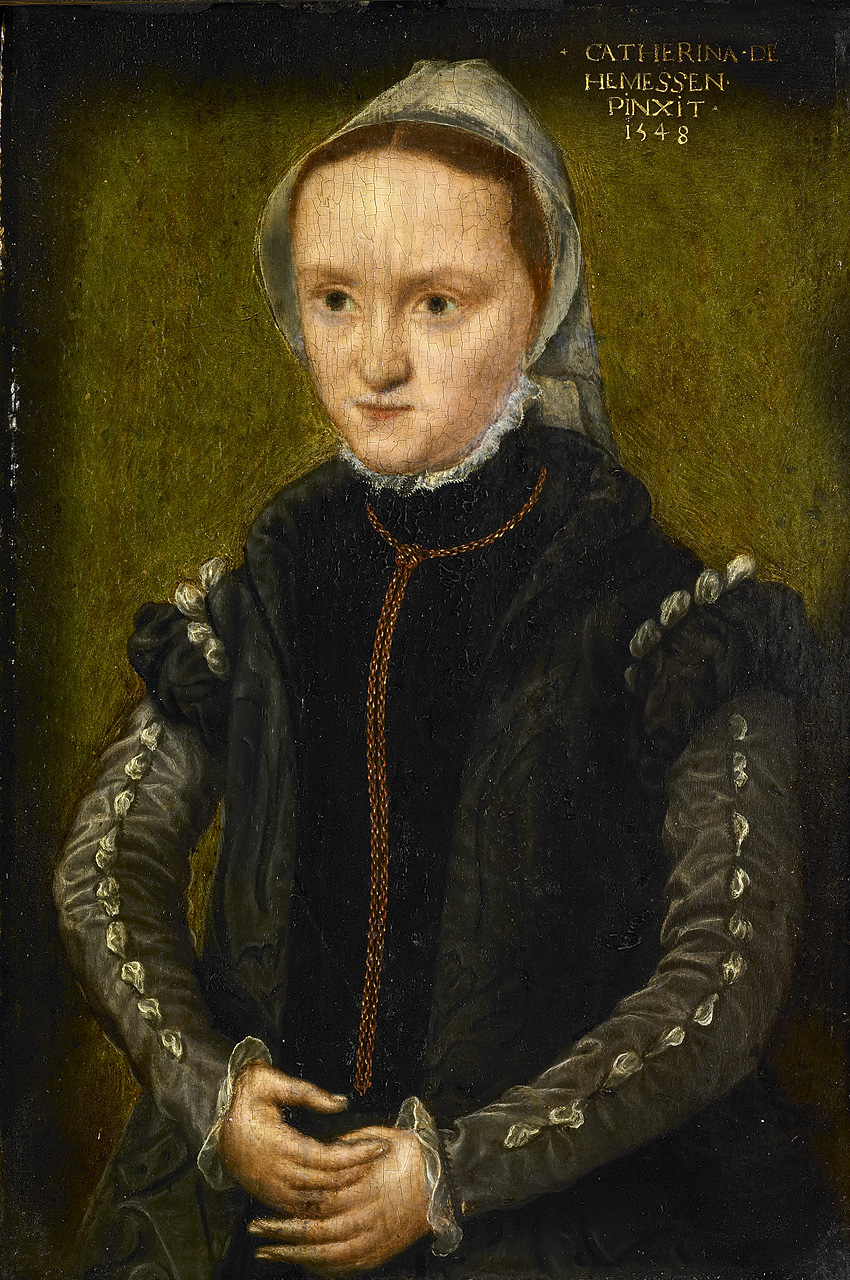
Portrait of a Woman, 1548

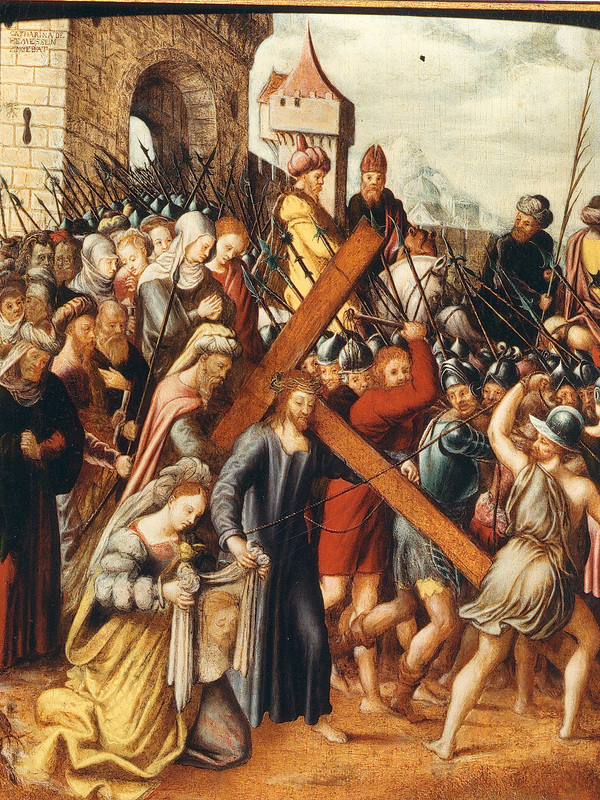
Christ meets Veronica, 1541–1554

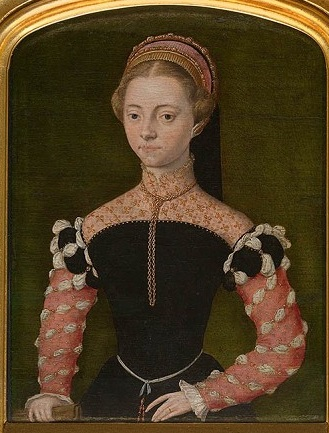
Portrait of a Lady

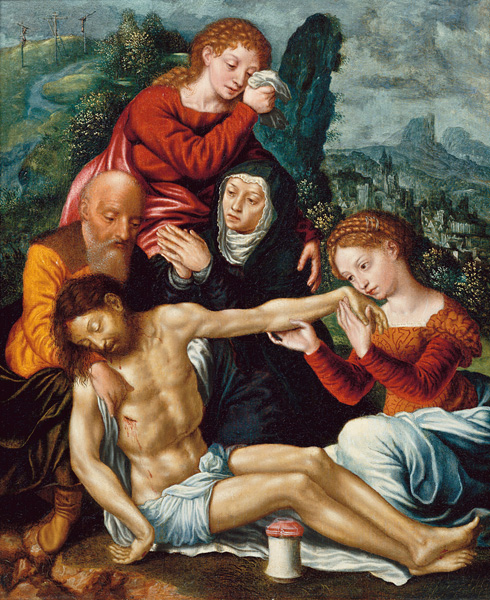
The Lamentation of Christ, first half of 16th century

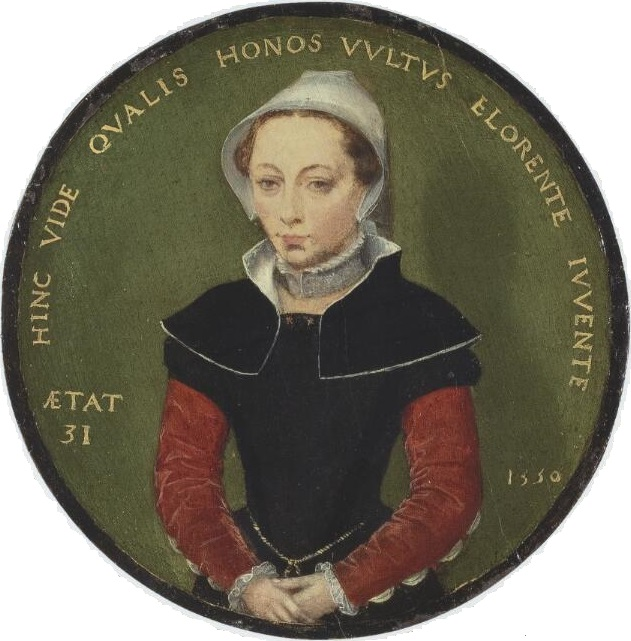
Portrait of a thirty-one year old woman, 1550

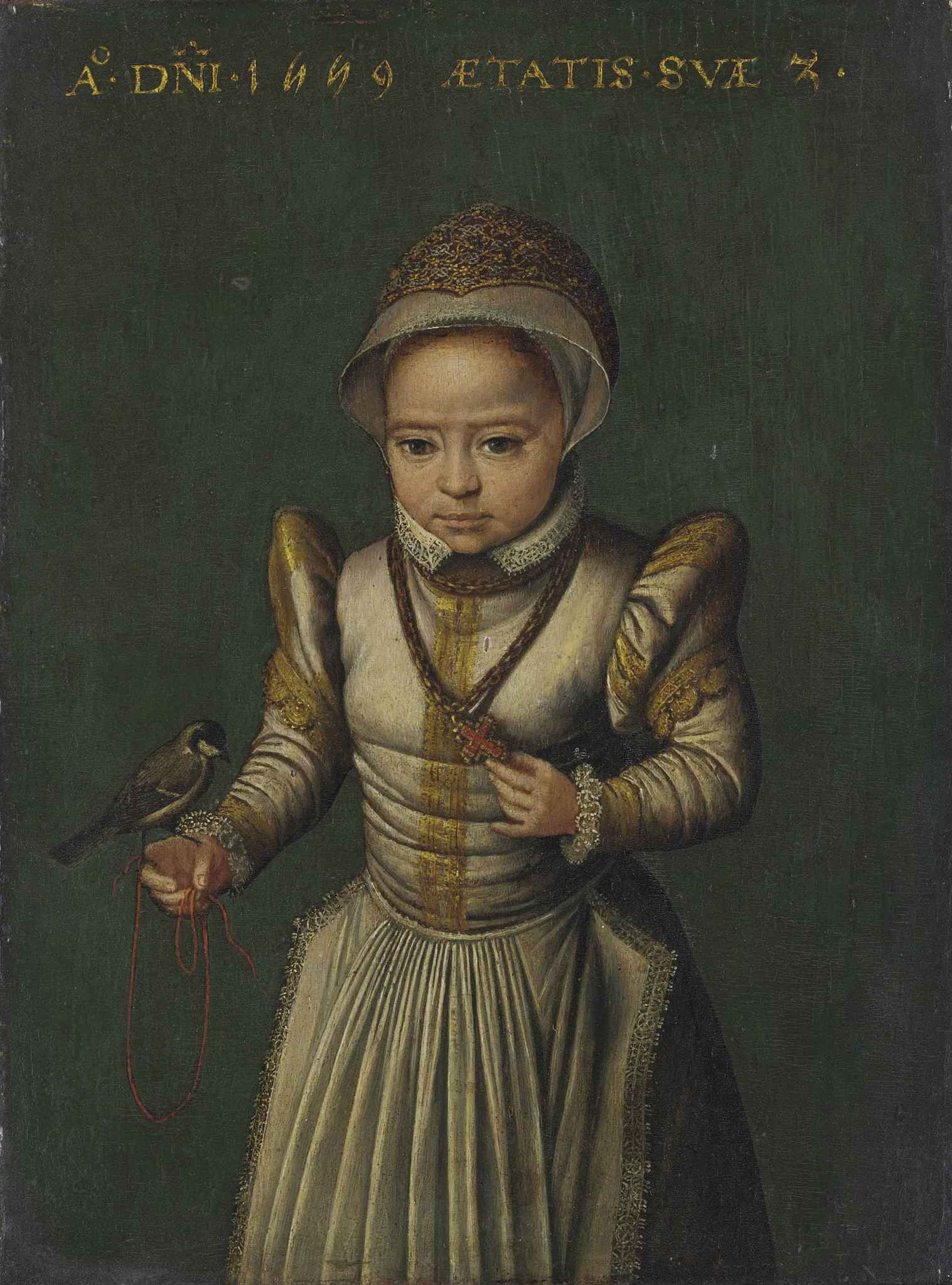
Portrait of a child, 1542 or 1560

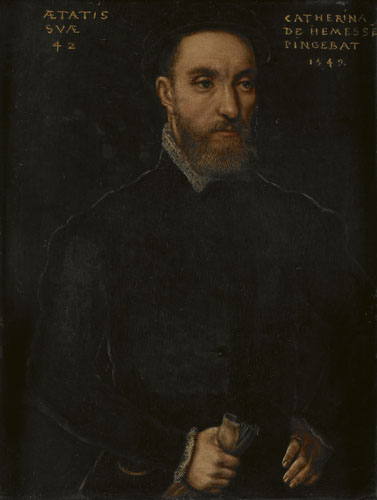
Portrait of a 42 years old man, 1542 or 1560

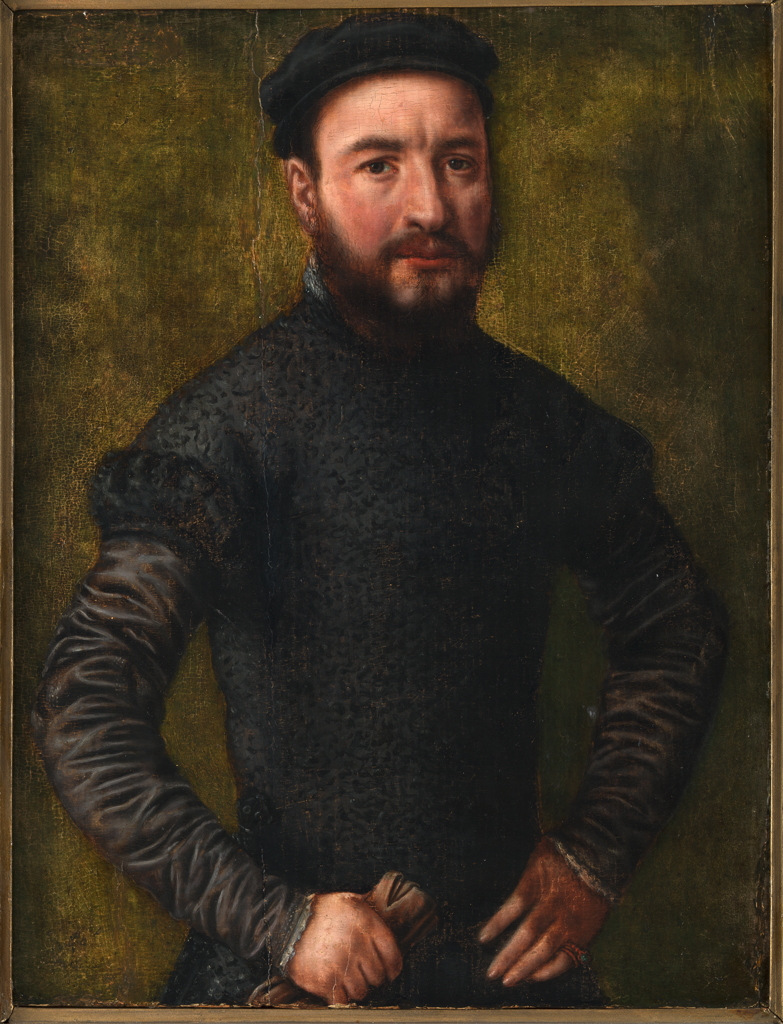
Portrait of a man, 1542 or 1560

== Sources ==
- Chadwick, Whitney, Women, Art, and Society, Thames and Hudson, London, 1990
- Jones, Susan Frances. Van Eyck to Gossaert. London: National Gallery, 2011. ISBN 978-1-85709-504-3
- Harris, Anne Sutherland and Linda Nochlin, Women Artists: 1550-1950, Los Angeles County Museum of Art, Knopf, New York, 1976
- Kemperdick, Stephan. The Early Portrait, from the Collection of the Prince of Liechtenstein and the Kunstmuseum Basel. Munich: Prestel, 2006. ISBN 3-7913-3598-7
- Kleiner, Fred. Gardner's Art Through the Ages. Wadsworth, 2009. ISBN 0-495-57364-7
- Heller, Nancy. Women Artists: An Illustrated History. New York: Abbeville Press, 1997. ISBN 0-7892-0345-6
