= Jan Sanders van Hemessen =

Flemish Renaissance painter (c.1500–c.1566)

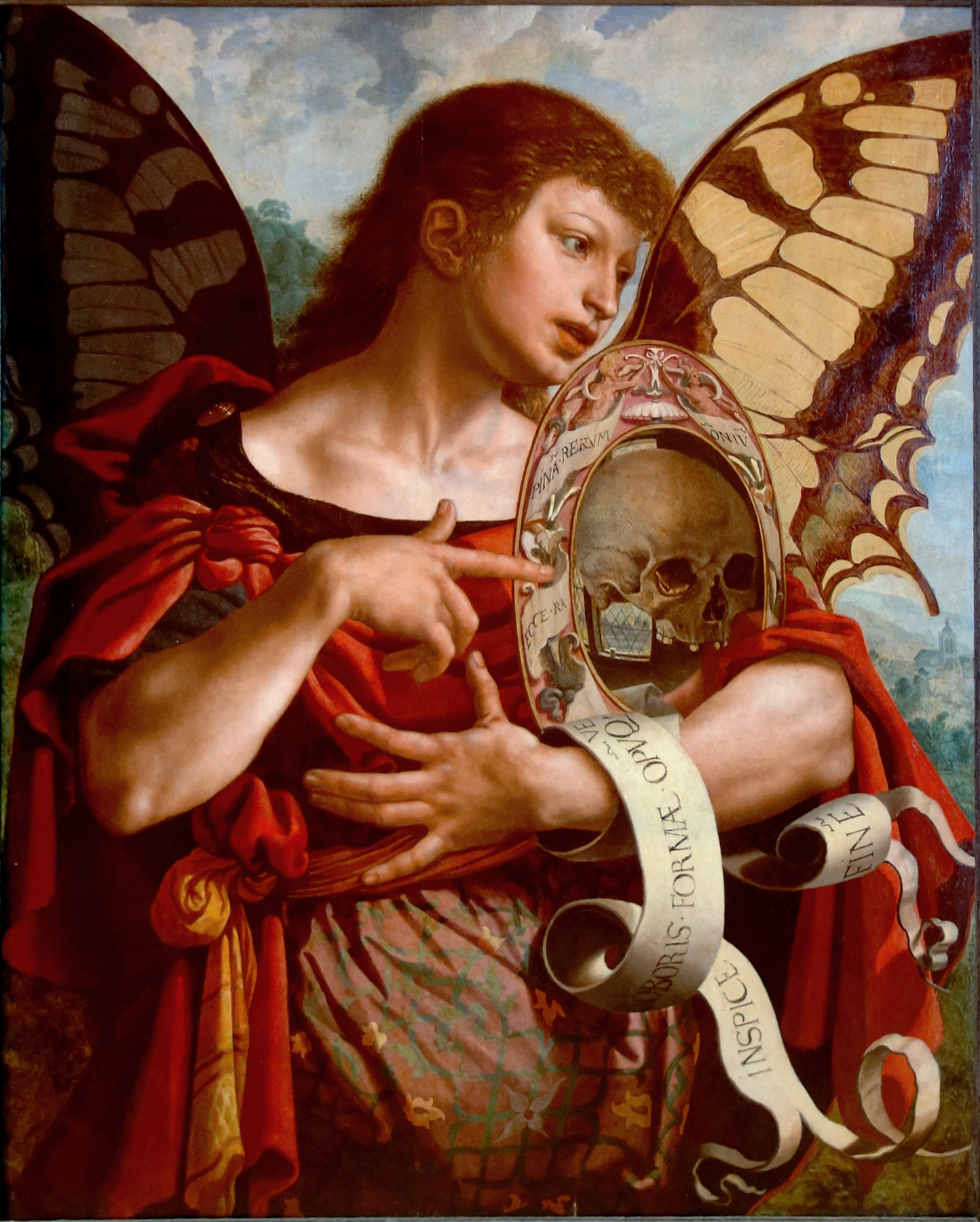
Vanitas

Jan Sanders van Hemessen (c. 1500 – c. 1566) was a leading Flemish Renaissance painter, belonging to the group of Italianizing Flemish painters called the Romanists, who were influenced by Italian Renaissance painting. Van Hemessen had visited Italy during the 1520s, and also Fontainebleau near Paris in the mid 1530s, where he was able to view the work of the colony of Italian artists known as the First School of Fontainebleau, who were working on the decorations for the Palace of Fontainebleau. Van Hemessen's works show his ability to interpret the Italian models into a new Flemish visual vocabulary.

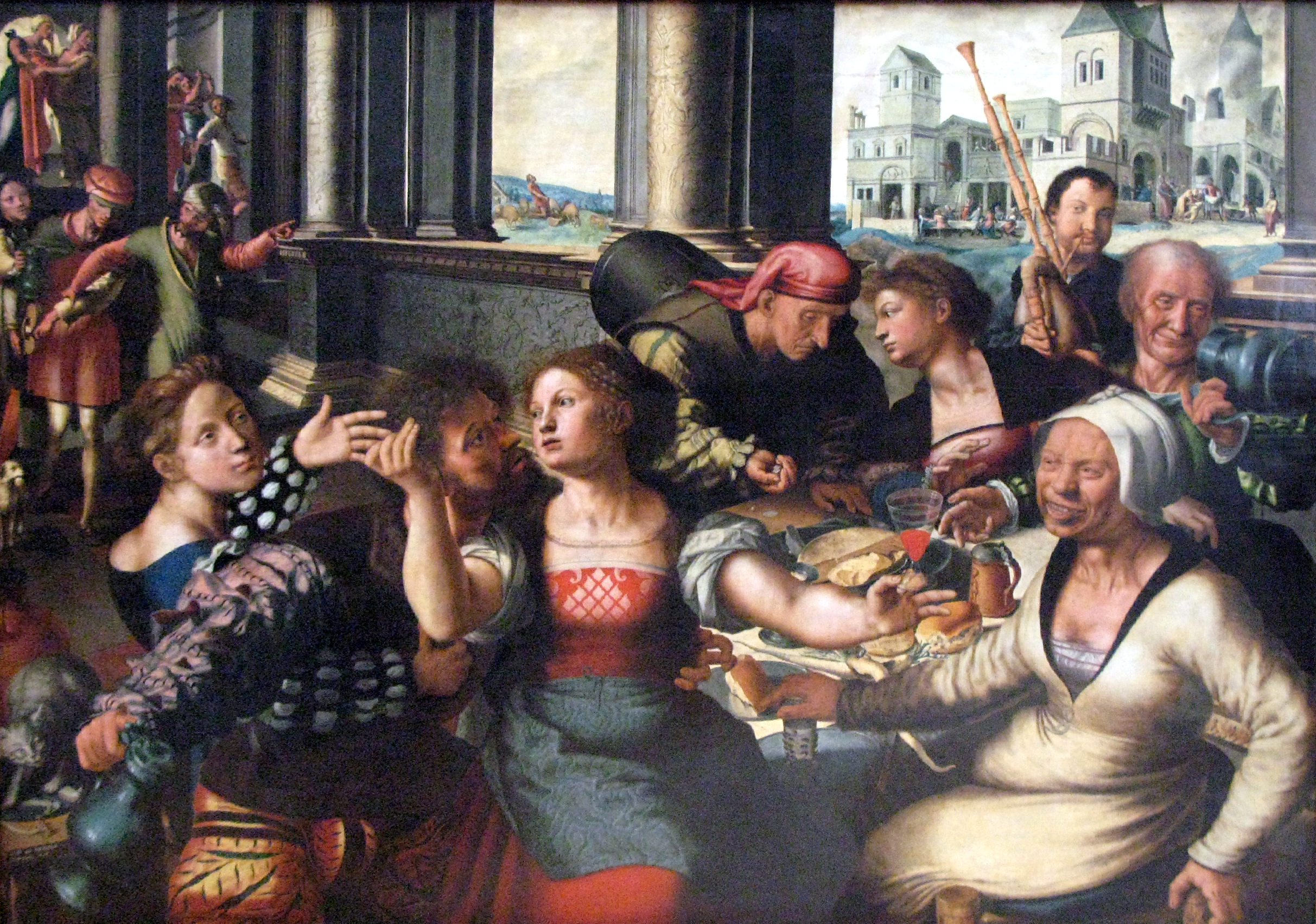
The Parable of the Prodigal Son, 1536

Hemessen played an important role in the development of genre painting, through his large scenes with religious or worldly subjects, set in towns with contemporary dress and architecture. These works depict human failings such as greed and vanity, and some show an interest in subjects with a financial angle. His genre scenes develop the "Mannerist inversion" later taken further by Pieter Aertsen, where a small religious scene in the background reveals the true meaning of the painting, which is dominated by a large foreground scene seemingly devoted to a secular genre subject. One of his best known works, the Parable of the Prodigal Son, expresses a religious theme through a pure genre painting set in a tavern and can be regarded as an important early statement of the merry company tradition. He also painted a small number of portraits, some of exceptional quality, influenced by Bronzino. Van Hemessen was also known for his large nude figures, a subject matter that he had familiarised himself with in Italy.

He was based in Antwerp between 1519 and 1550, joining the artist's Guild of Saint Luke there in 1524. After 1550 he may have moved to Haarlem. He painted several religious subjects, and many others may have been destroyed in the Beeldenstorm that swept through Antwerp in the year of his death.

== Life ==
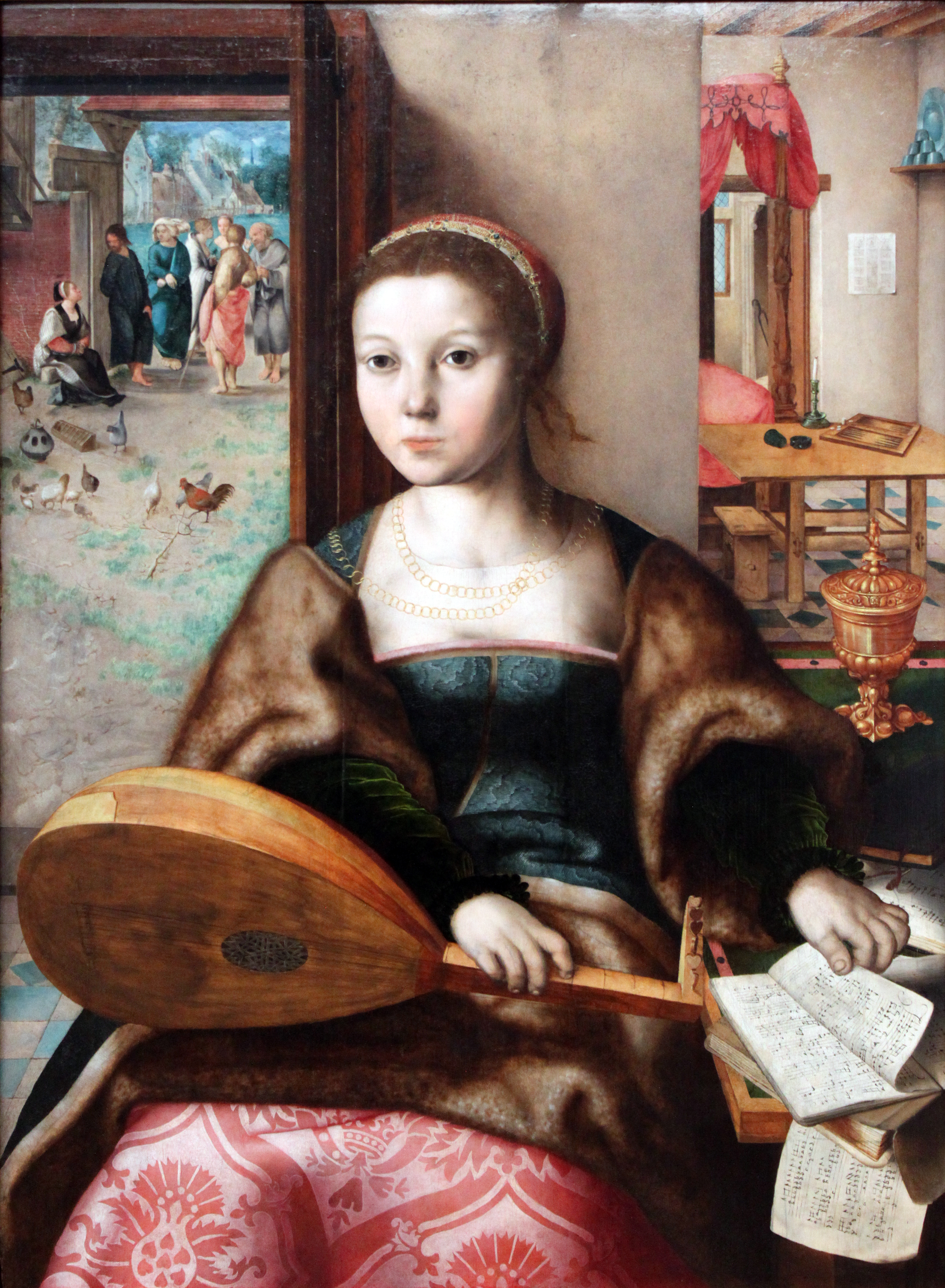
Maria Magdalene with a lute, in the background Christ at Martha's house, 1550

Jan Sanders van Hemessen was born in Hemiksem, then called Hemessen or Heymissen. He was an apprentice of Hendrick van Cleve I in Antwerp. He traveled to Italy early in his career, around 1520. Here he studied both models from classical antiquity, such as the Laocoön as well as the contemporary works of Michelangelo and Raphael. He returned to Antwerp where he entered the local Guild of Saint Luke as a master in 1524.

Van Hemessen is believed to have worked early in his career at the royal court in Mechelen. Here he may have first encountered Jan Gossaert, a court painter, as well as the Master of the Legend of the Magdalen. Although the early biographer Karel van Mander wrote that van Hemessen spent time in Haarlem, there is no evidence for this statement.

Van Hemessen was married to Barbara de Fevre with whom he had two daughters, Christina and Catharina. After his wife's death, he had an illegitimate son called Peeter with his maid Betteken. After the death of Jan Sanders van Hemessen and Betteken, Peeter was legitimised in 1579, at the age of 24. Jan Sanders van Hemessen trained his daughter Catharina van Hemessen who became a successful portrait painter. It is not known where van Hemessen died.

== Work ==
=== General ===
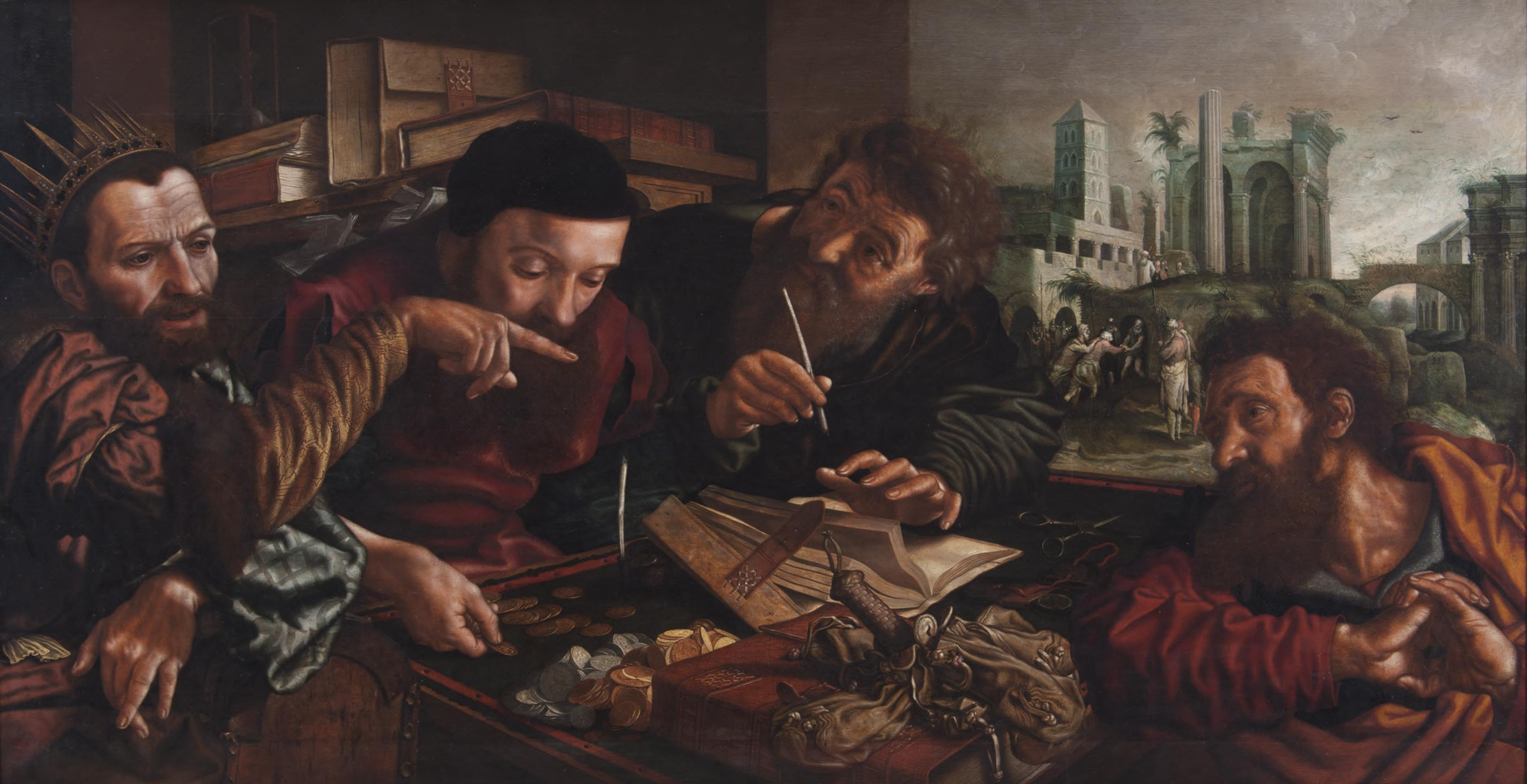
The Parable of the Unmerciful Servant, c. 1556

Van Hemessen painted a very wide range of subjects, including religious, mythological and allegorical scenes, nudes, portraits and genre scenes.

Van Hemessen was one of the earliest Netherlandish artists to exploit the genre character of biblical subjects often for a moralizing purpose. Van Hemessen specialized in scenes of human character flaws such as vanity and greed. His pictures often have a religious subject. His style helped found the Flemish traditions of genre painting.

Van Hemessen was also a portrait painter. His Mannerist style is characterised by muscular and palpably three-dimensional figures, a densely packed foreground of abruptly cropped forms, and vigorous, even flamboyant gestures. Hemessen counterbalanced the influence of Classical and Renaissance models with the realism he must have learned from northern artists such as Quentin Matsys, Joos van Cleve, Marinus van Reymerswaele and possibly even Lucas van Leyden and Hans Holbein the Younger.

=== Merry companies ===
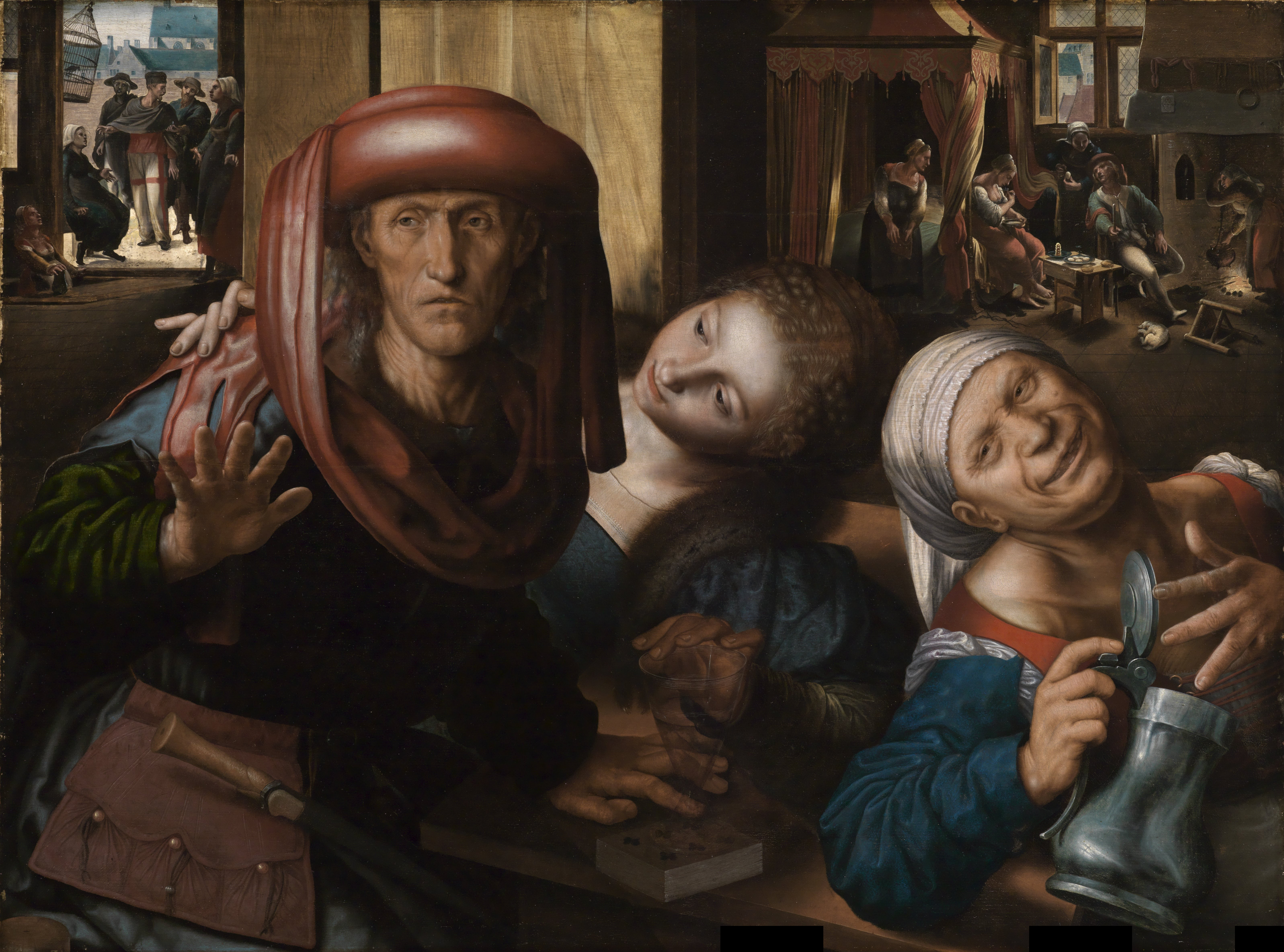
Loose Company

Jan Sanders van Hemessen is associated with the development of the merry company theme in Flemish genre painting. He commenced his compositions on this theme with a 1536 painting on a religious subject, i.e. the Parable of the Prodigal Son (Royal Museums of Fine Arts of Belgium). The foreground of the composition shows the prodigal son during his days of high living in the company of prostitutes, music, wine and gambling. In the background through the open window one can discern a scene of the prodigal son living among the swine after he has fallen on hard times and the scene of his reunion with his father who forgives him. The composition clearly carries the moral lesson that one needs to see beyond the earthly pleasures depicted in the foreground to find the path of redemption, which is shown in the background.

Van Hemessen produced tavern and brothel scenes that address the theme of unbridled living where drinking causes more sinfulness. The depiction of his tavern and brothel scenes may have been intended more to please the viewer by a display of the artist's skill and the humor of the subject matter than a high moral judgment. This is shown in the Loose Company (c. 1540, Staatliche Kunsthalle Karlsruhe) in which van Hemessen depicts a brothel scene. In the foreground is shown an elderly man who is being caressed by an attractive young woman. The man seems to have second thoughts as he raises his hand in protestation. The procuress in the picture is laughing as she has already put his money in her pewter. The scene is painted with convincing realism and illusionism.

=== The Calling of St. Matthew ===
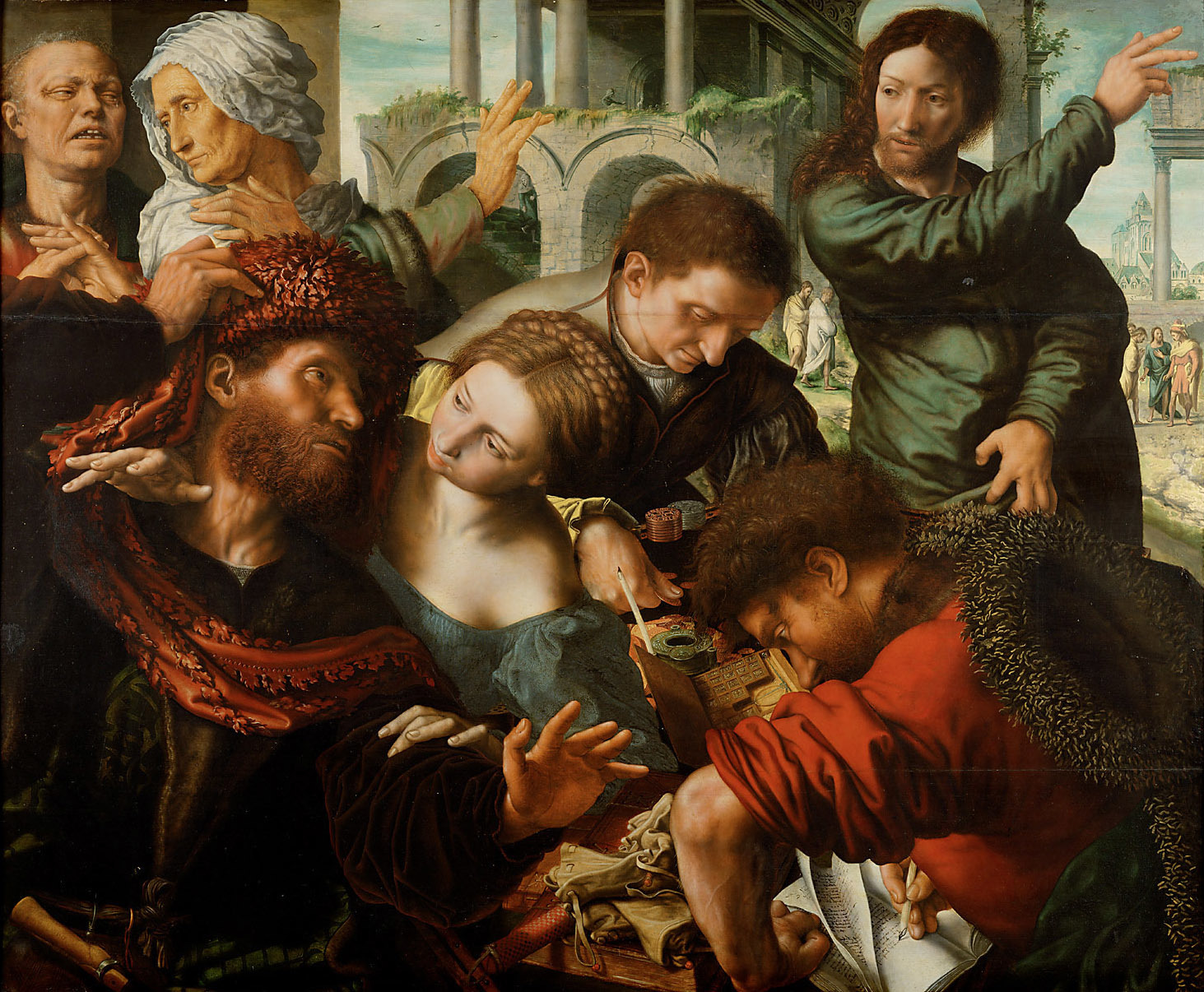
The Calling of Saint Matthew, Kunsthistorisches Museum, c. 1548

Jan Sanders van Hemessen painted several compositions on the subject of the Calling of St. Matthew: one version in the Alte Pinakothek, two in the Kunsthistorisches Museum and a workshop version in the Metropolitan Museum of Art. The subject matter provided van Hemessen with another occasion to use a religious subject to convey a moral message. The biblical story goes that St Matthew started out his life as a publican until he was called upon by Jesus and immediately followed him. The story provided van Hemessen with an excuse to paint a scene contrasting people busily engaged in commercial activities, in particular money changing or counting, and the serene Jesus.

The workshop version in the Metropolitan Museum of Art is a close copy of the 1548 version in the Kunsthistorisches Museum, only the background is different. In both version Jesus is shown beckoning to Matthew using a gesture reminiscent of Italian art. In the immediate foreground is Matthew, whose arms and head are depicted in dramatic foreshortening while he turns toward Jesus in response to his call. Two of Matthew's colleagues are not aware of the momentous event taking place and they continue with their work of counting money and recording payments. The figure of Matthew is a concealed portrait of Emperor Charles V, the then ruler of Flanders.

=== The Surgeon ===
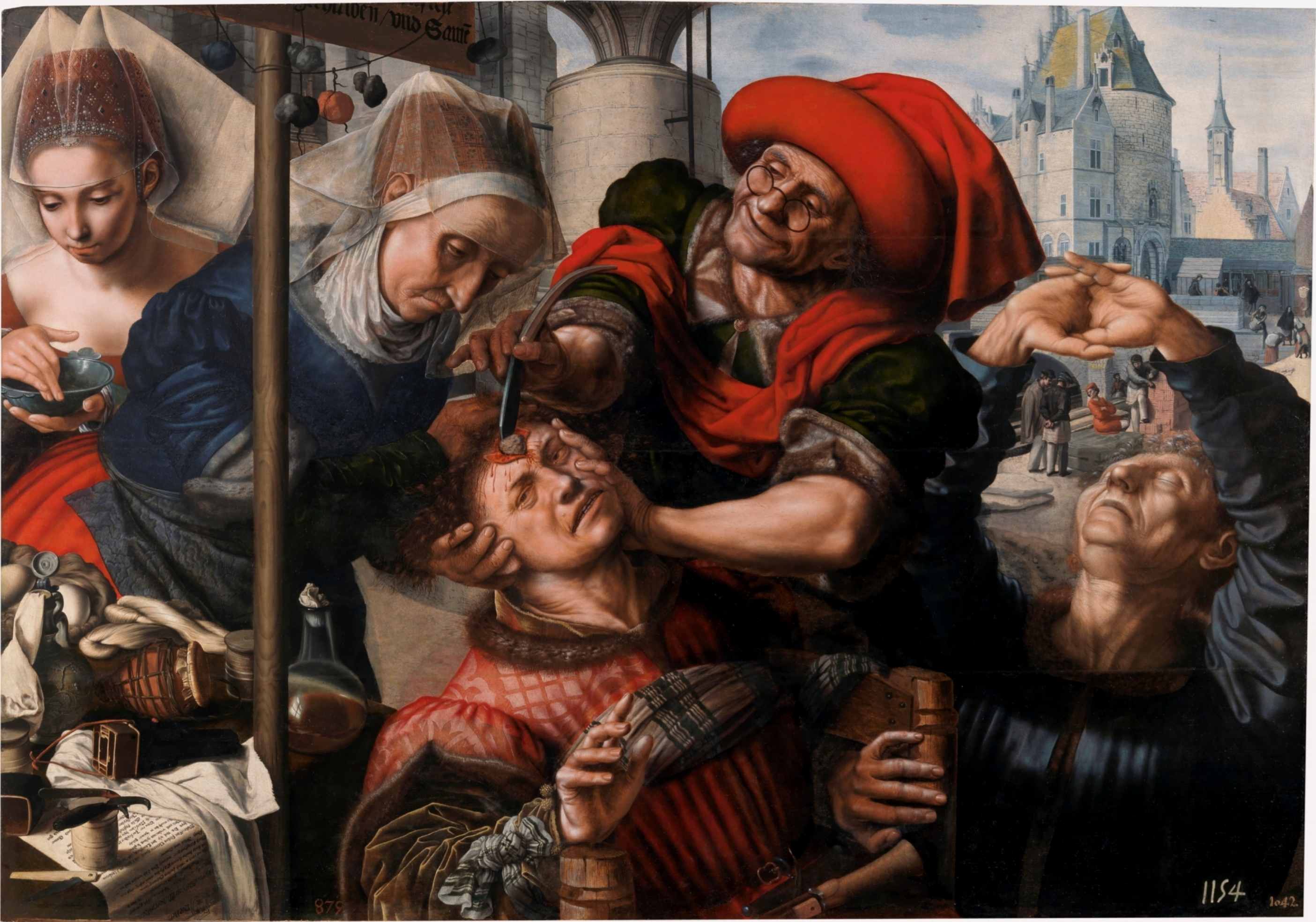
The Surgeon

Another representative work of Jan Sanders van Hemessen with a moral message is The Surgeon of 1555 (Museo del Prado, Madrid). The composition represents a scene commonly found in Flemish genre painting. The scene is an urban setting, likely a market. A surgeon is in the process of removing with a knife a stone (believed to be the stone of madness), which is visible inside an incision in the patient's open skull. The madness of the patient was believed to disappear with the removal of the stone. It is implied that the surgeon is actually a quack who has himself placed the stone in the incision by a sleight of hand before pretending to remove it.

As an advertisement for his skills there is behind him a line on which hang stones, which he has supposedly removed from earlier patients. Next to the surgeon stands a man who is gesturing in desperation, as he is clearly the next patient to go under the scalpel. On the left a female assistant is preparing ointment in a bowl. The composition is a denunciation of the greed of the surgeon who abuses his patients' gullibility.

=== Portraits ===
His style of portrait painting played an important role in the popularity of portraiture in northern Europe from circa 1540 onwards.While Michelangelo and Raphael were the principal influences on his religious compositions, his later portraiture owed more to Agnolo Bronzino. At the same time, his portraits include elements from Flemish painting of his time.

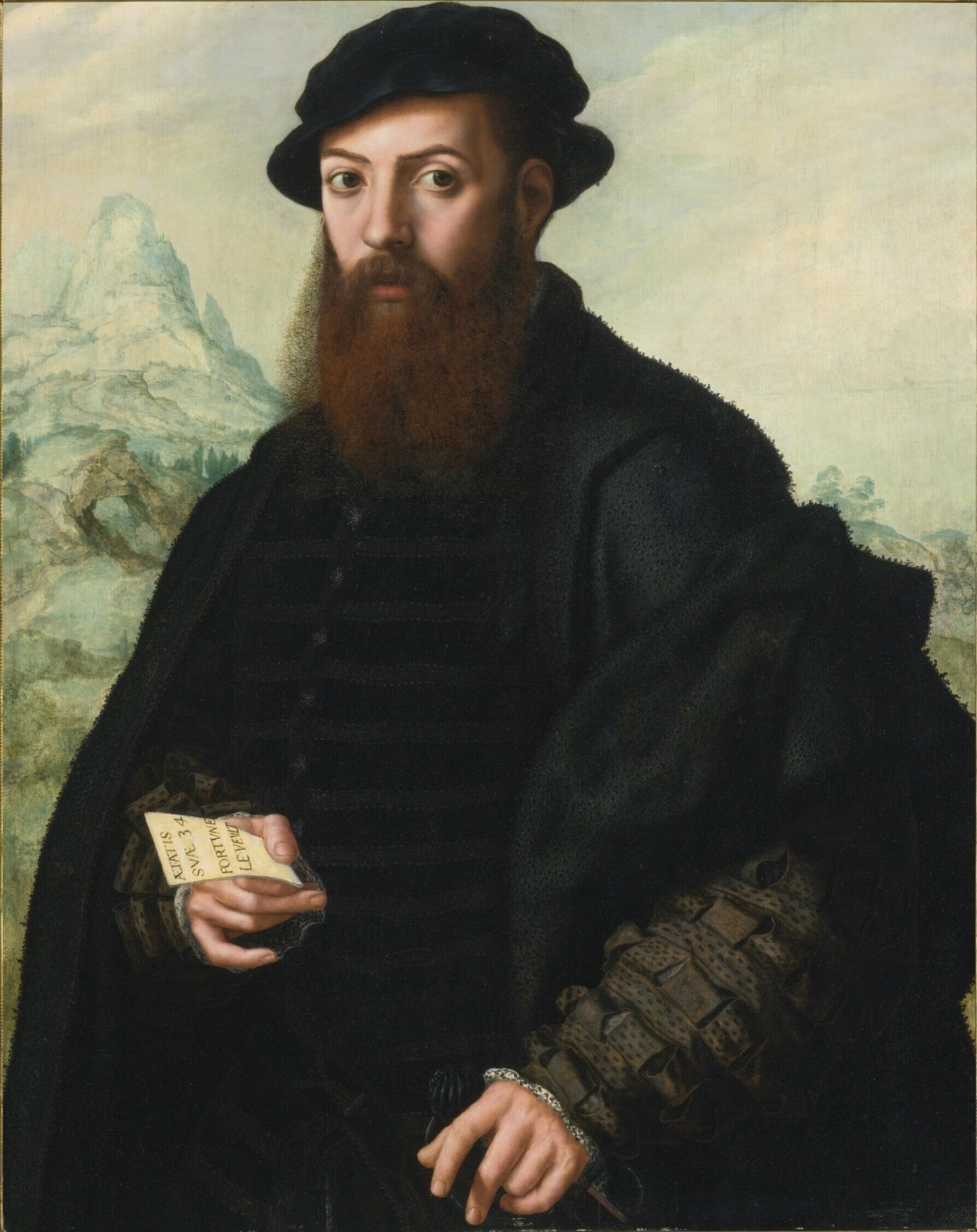
Portrait of a Gentleman, Aged 34, before an Extensive Landscape

An example of his portraits is the Portrait of a Gentleman, Aged 34, before an Extensive Landscape dated between 1530 and the early 1540s (sold at Sotheby's on 9 July 2014 in London, lot 41, fetching £1,762,500). It is clearly inspired by Bronzino's portraits from the 1530s, which van Hemessen must have known through prints. The Portrait of a Gentleman shows an arrangement of the hands typical for Bronzino but started by Titian: the right hand is grasping an item representative of the sitter’s interests or identity, while the other hand rests lower down the plane. This arrangement would become standard practice in High Renaissance and Mannerist portraiture. An important element in van Hemessen’s work differs from his Itialian model: the landscape. Beyond the sitter is visible a ‘world landscape’ in the more developed form as it was practised in the Low Countries in the 1530s and reminiscent of the landscapes of Matthys Cock.

== Selected works ==
- St. Jerome (1548)
- The Surgeon (1555), Museo del Prado, Madrid
- The Parable of the Unmerciful Servant (c. 1556), University of Michigan Museum of Art, Ann Arbor, Michigan
- Woman Weighing Gold
- Vanitas
- Judith and Holofernes, Chicago Museum of Art. A slightly darker copy of the same picture is in the Kunsthalle Bremen, Germany. The website of the museum ascribes this picture to 'Workshop Jan Sanders van Hemessen'
- Allegorical Scene
- The Holy Family
- Isaac Blessing Jacob
- Virgin and Child,
- Tarquin and Lucretia
- Merry Company
- Tobias Restores His Father's Sight
- The Calling of Saint Matthew

== Sources ==
- Kemperdick, Stephan. The Early Portrait, from the Collection of the Prince of Liechtenstein and the Kunstmuseum Basel. Munich: Prestel, 2006. ISBN 3-7913-3598-7
- Silver, Larry. Peasant Scenes and Landscapes: The Rise of Pictorial Genres in the Antwerp Art Market, Philadelphia, PA: University of Pennsylvania Press, 2006
- Snyder, James. Northern Renaissance Art, 1985, Harry N. Abrams, ISBN 0136235964
